= Barton Creek Square =

- Map of Barton Creek Square Mall
- Location: Austin, Texas, United States
- Coordinates: 30.2576°N 97.8068°W
- Opened: August 19, 1981
- Developer: Melvin Simon & Associates
- Manager: Simon Property Group
- Owner: Simon Property Group
- Num. of stores: 155
- Num. of anchor tenants: 6 (5 open, 1 coming soon)
- Floor area: 1,429,503 sq ft (132,805.2 m^{2})
- Floors: 2
- Website: simon.com/mall/barton-creek-square

Barton Creek Square is an enclosed shopping mall located in southwest Austin, Texas in the United States, near the intersection of Texas State Highway Loop 1 and Texas State Highway Loop 360. The mall is eponymously named after Barton Creek, Texas. Anchor stores are Dillard's, JCPenney, Macy's, and Nordstrom. There is one anchor tenant last occupied by Sears that is currently under development to become a Dick's House of Sport.

== History ==
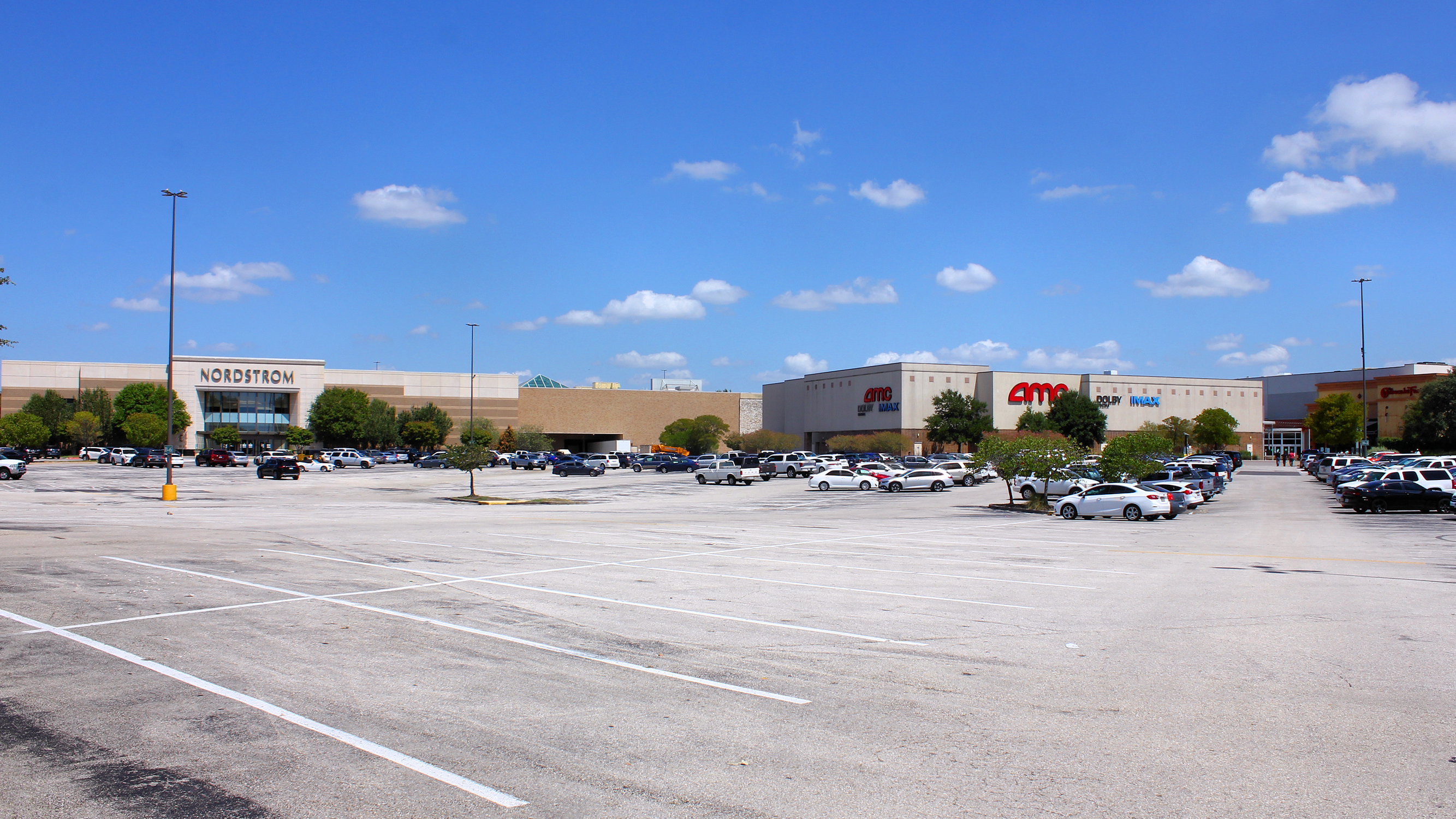
South side of Barton Creek Square

In June 1977, Melvin Simon & Associates announced the development of a shopping mall on a 104-acre (42 ha) tract of land along Texas State Highway Loop 360 in southwest Austin. Initial plans called for over 1 million ft^{2} (93,000 m^{2}) of retail space and parking capacity for nearly 6,000 cars, which would make the mall the largest in Austin. Finalization of plans to extend Texas State Highway Loop 1 ("MoPac") to intersect with Highway 360 adjacent to the planned site delayed construction, but clearing and grading of the land was begun by late October 1977. Continued delays in the MoPac extension caused further delays in the mall's construction and negotiations between the developers and potential tenants. Designs for Barton Creek Square were finalized in 1978; Gordon Sibeck, designer of the Windsor Park Mall in San Antonio, was selected as the mall's designer. During construction of the mall, worsening water quality on the nearby Barton Creek and the possibility that the mall's construction could do further damage to the creek prompted daily municipal surveillance of the site in 1980. Erosion control measures were approved for the site after the City of Austin's Environmental Board found the site in violation of city standards.

Barton Creek Square Mall opened in 1981 as one of the largest malls in Texas. The mall was originally anchored by Sears, JCPenney, Montgomery Ward, Foley's, Joskes, and the Austin-based Scarbrough's department store. Opening of the mall occurred in phases, with the first stores (Sears and JCPenney) opening on August 1 while construction within the rest of the mall continued. Barton Creek Square officially opened on August 19 with 77 stores out of an anticipated 175–185 businesses; 85,000–90,000 people visited the mall on its opening day. In November 1981, the mall became the first in Texas to have Braille and bold print signage throughout the center.

A renovation in 2003 added a Nordstrom department store in the place of a Montgomery Ward which had gone out of business two years prior. That store would officially open on August 15, 2003. Further renovations occurred in 2013, which included a redesigned food court. A Cheesecake Factory restaurant then opened in August 2015.

In 2015, Sears Holdings spun off 235 of its properties, including the Sears at Barton Creek Square, into Seritage Growth Properties. On October 15, 2018, it was announced that the Sears store would be closing as part of a plan to close 142 stores nationwide. On August 4, 2018, a Disney Junior themed kids zone opened right next to Brighton Collectibles.

In 2019, the mall's owner, Simon Property Group, embarked on a renovation, which included a new paint scheme, flooring, LED lighting, glass handrails, as well as exterior additions such as canopies, fire pits, and turf areas. The renovation also included the addition of a co-working space near Nordstrom, which includes workstations with televisions and charging stations.

On March 17, 2020 the mall limited its hours to 11 am to 7 pm in response to Coronavirus disease 2019; the next day, Simon Property Group announced in a press release it would close all its US domestic malls until March 29. On May 1, 2020, Simon Property Group reopened the mall.

In 2026, Dick's Sporting Goods announced that they would be opening one of their large format Dick's House of Sport concept stores inside the former Sears. The store is expected to open sometime in late 2027. Development of this new store is currently ongoing and is expected to take up the entire anchor building.

== Gallery ==
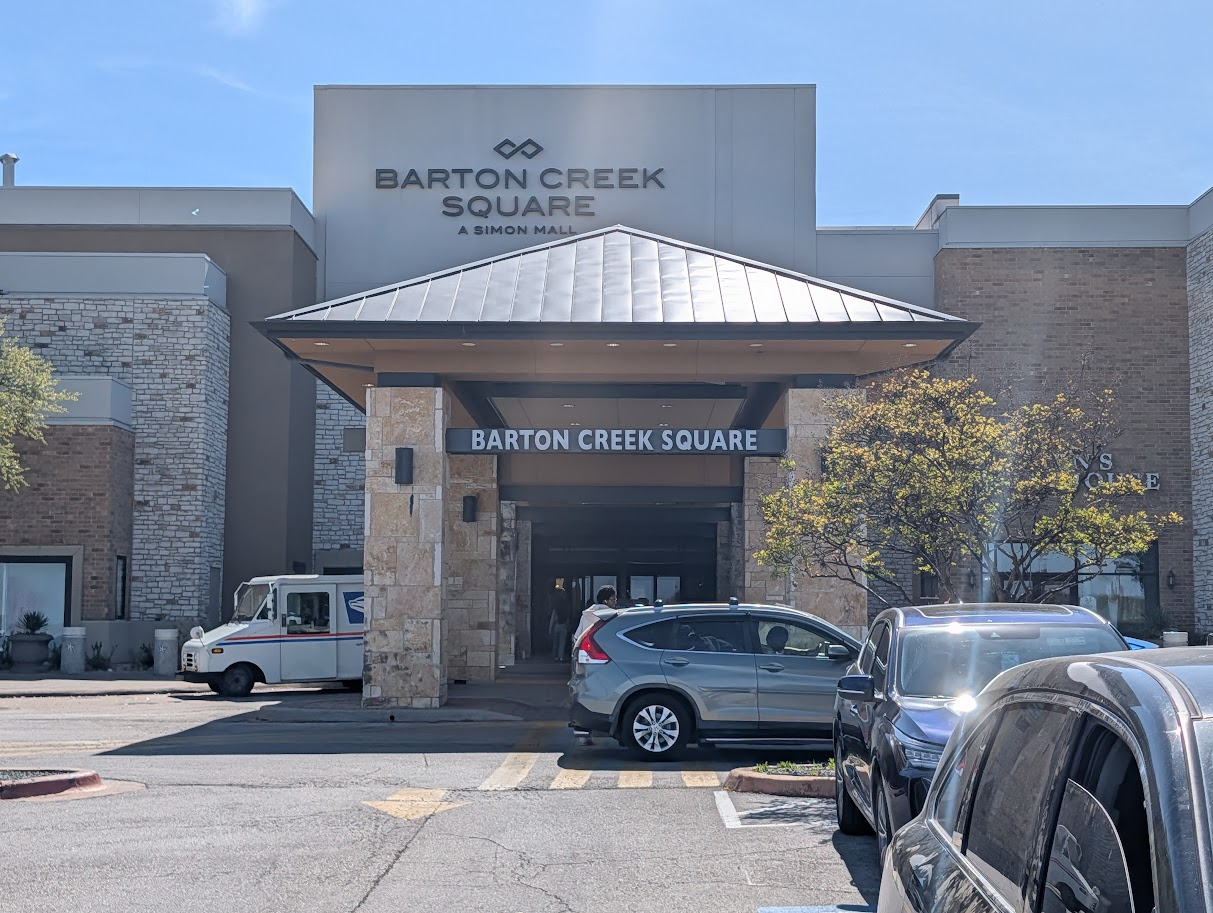
Northeast Entrance

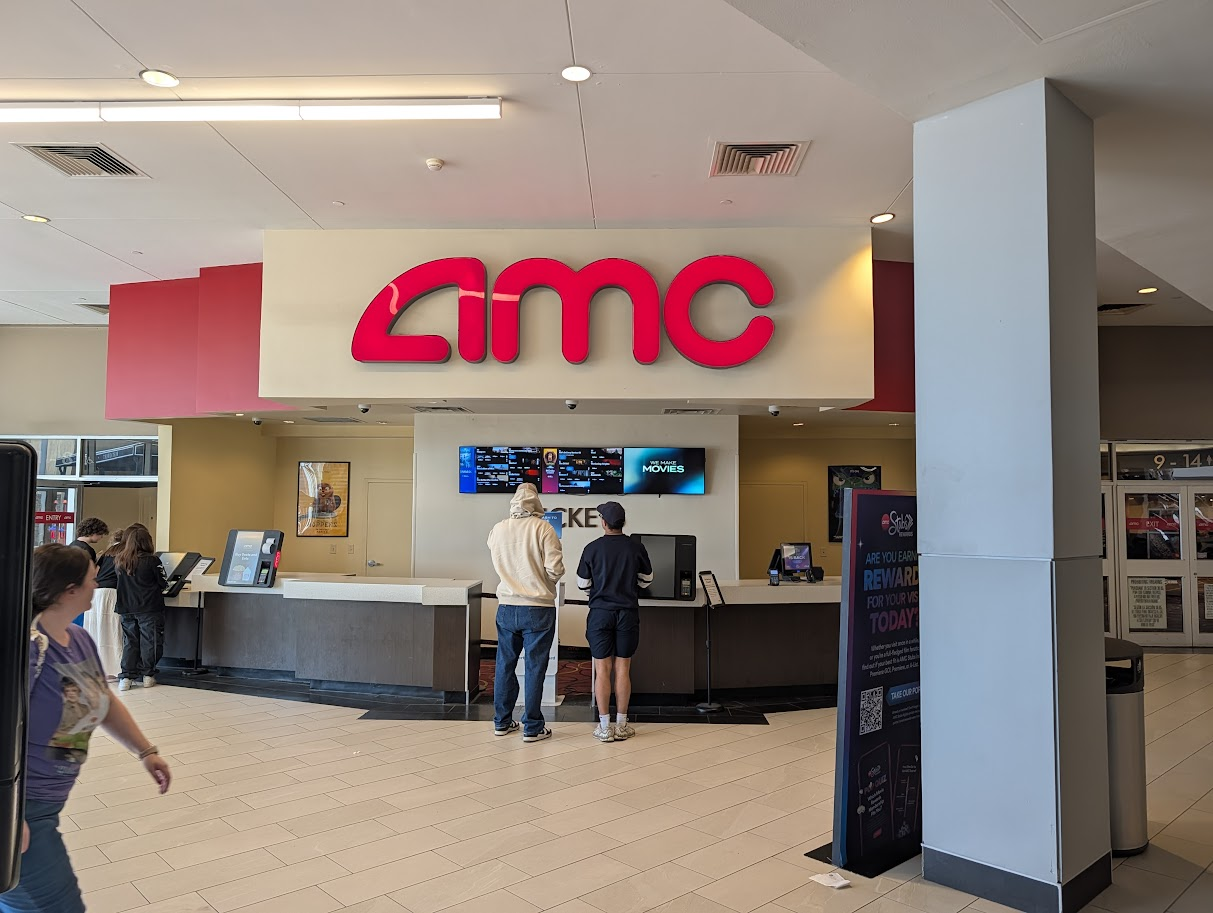
AMC Entrance

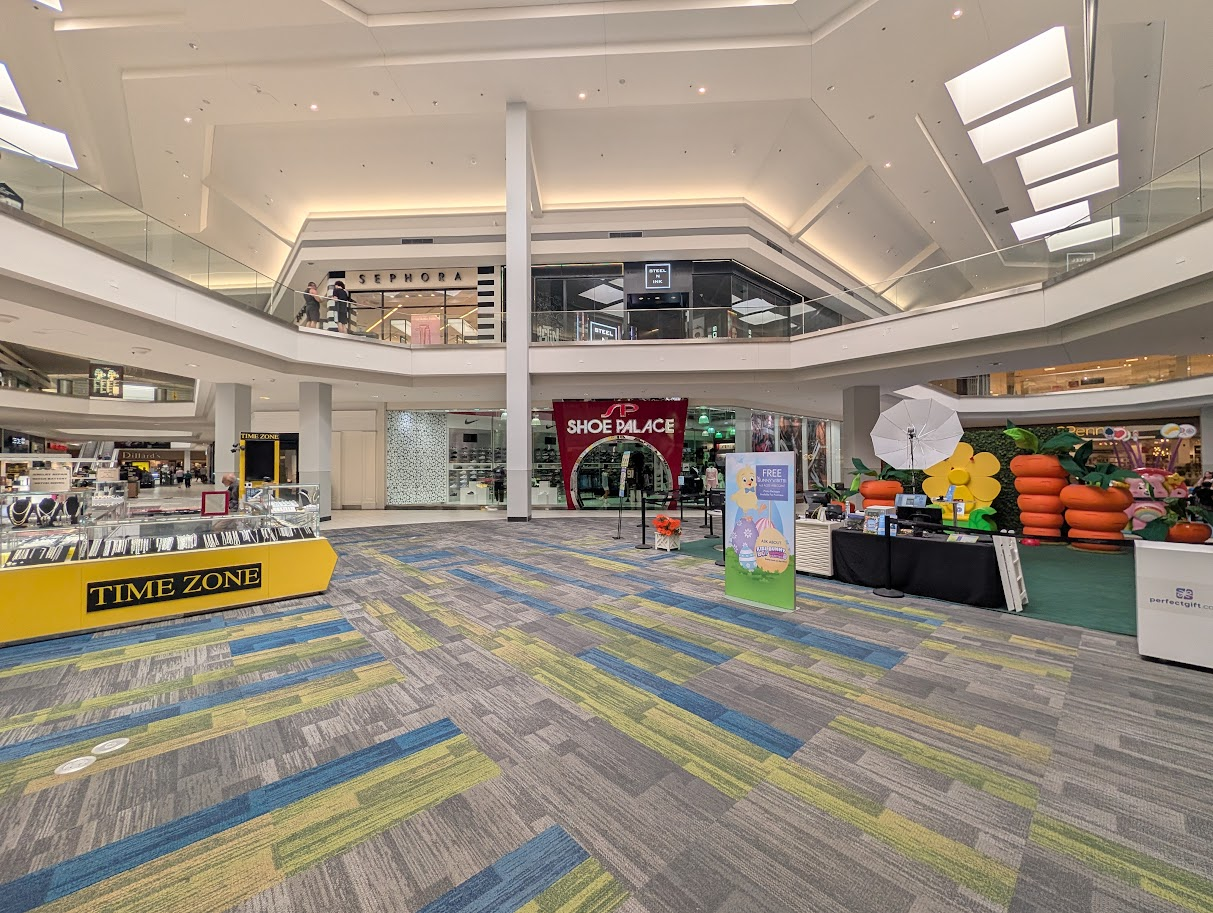
East Court

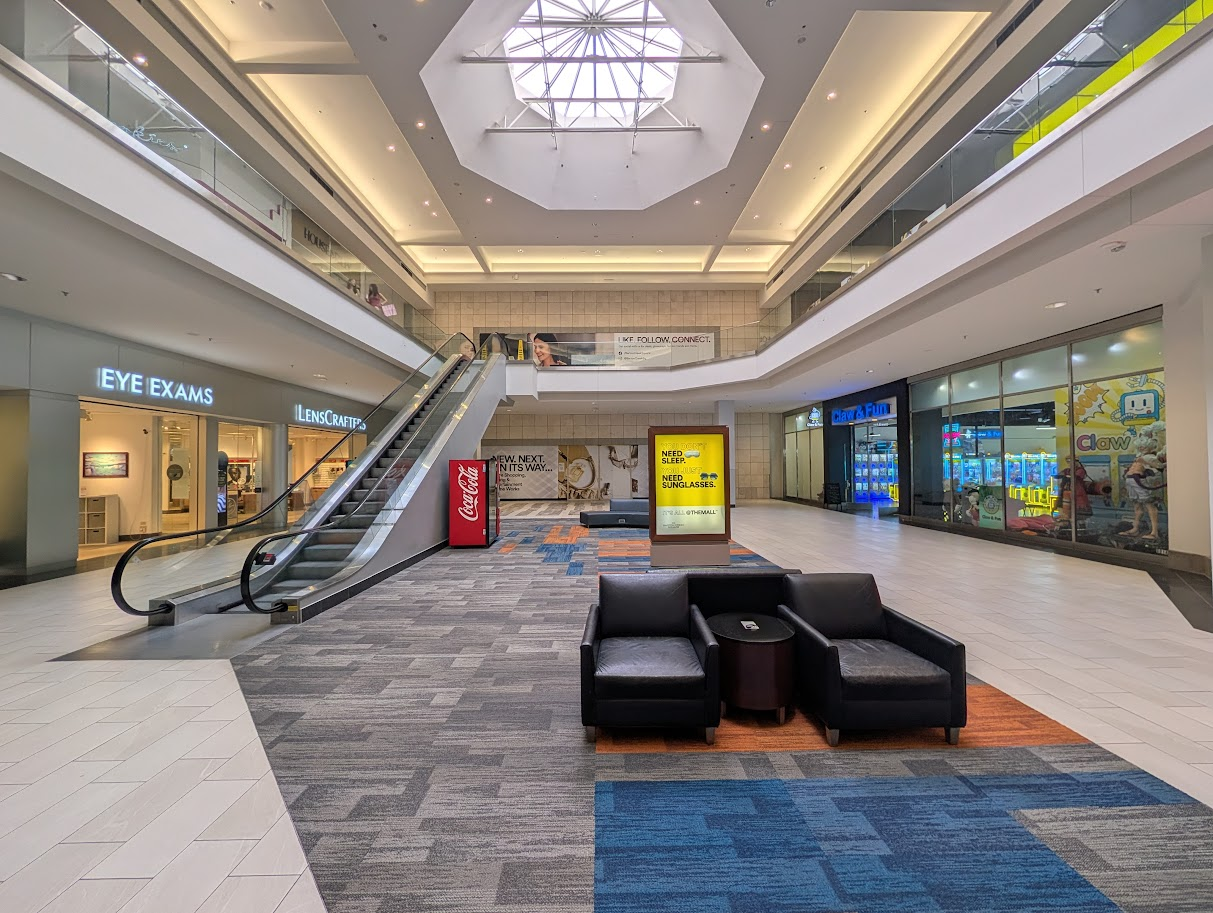
South Court

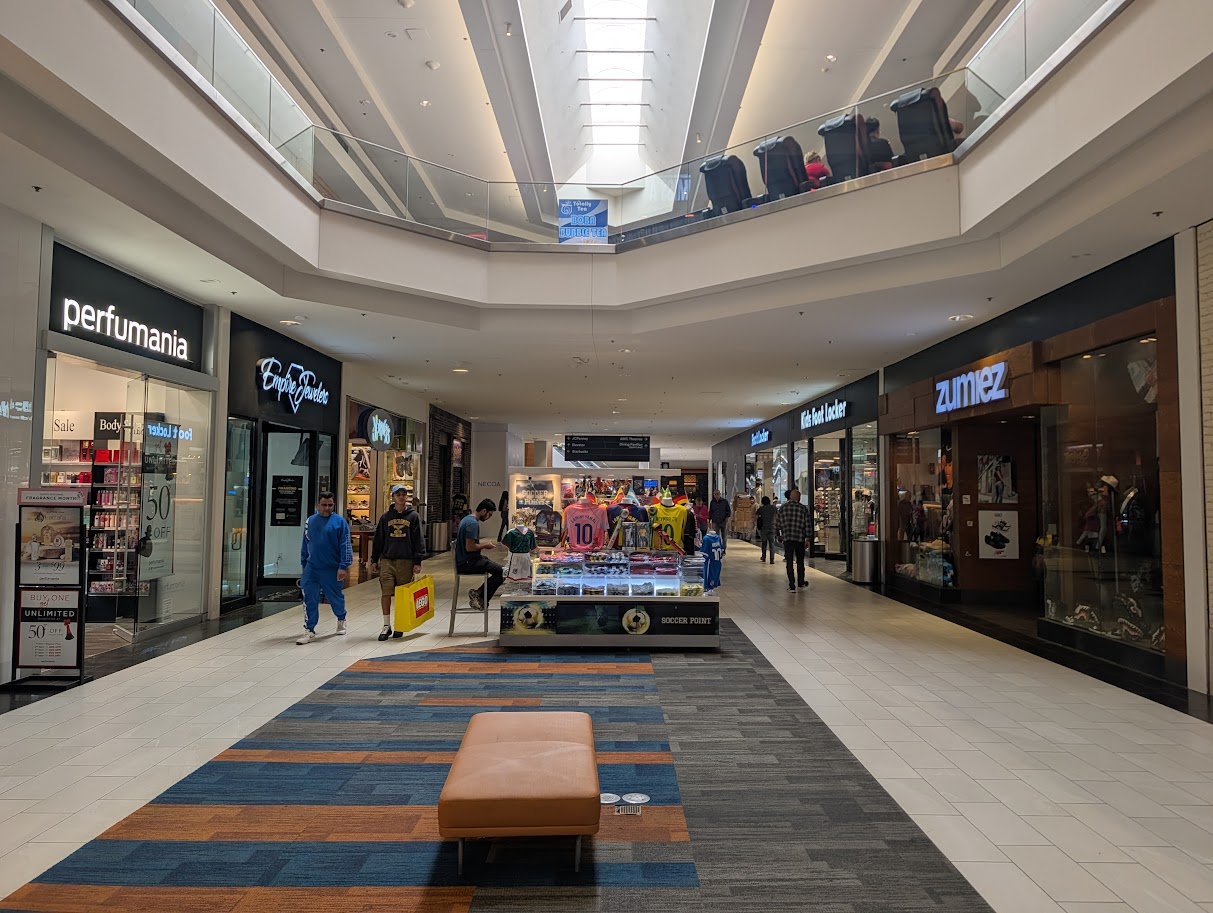
South Wing

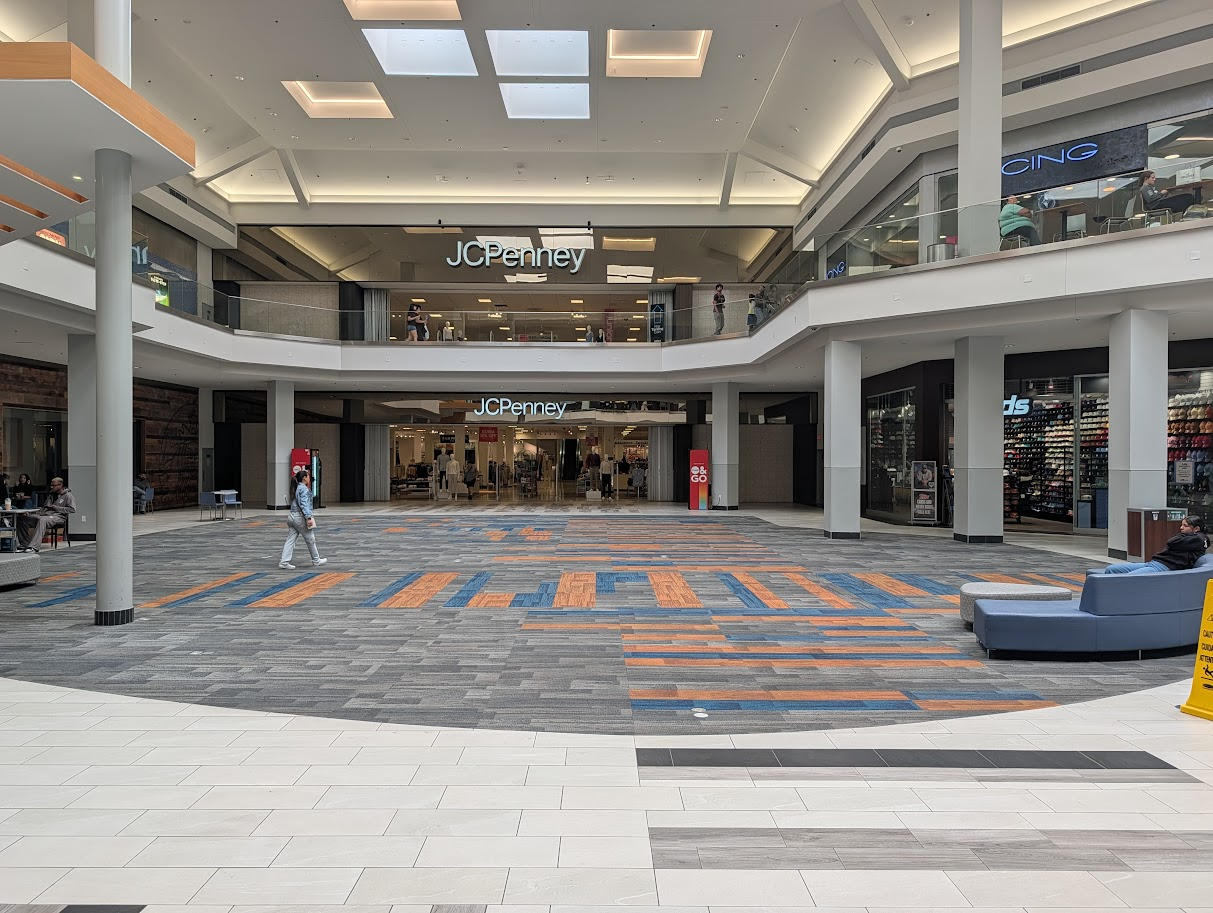
JCPenney West Entrance

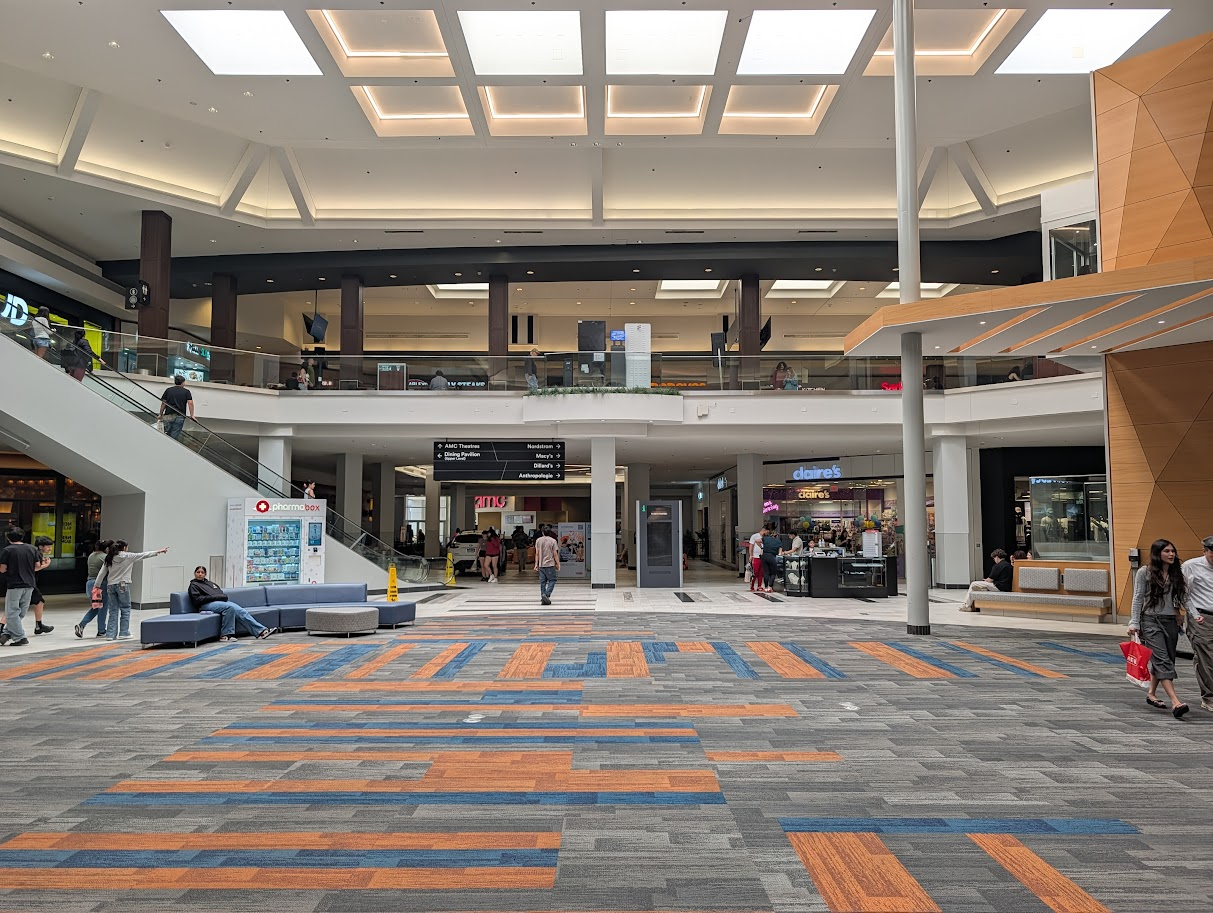
South Court

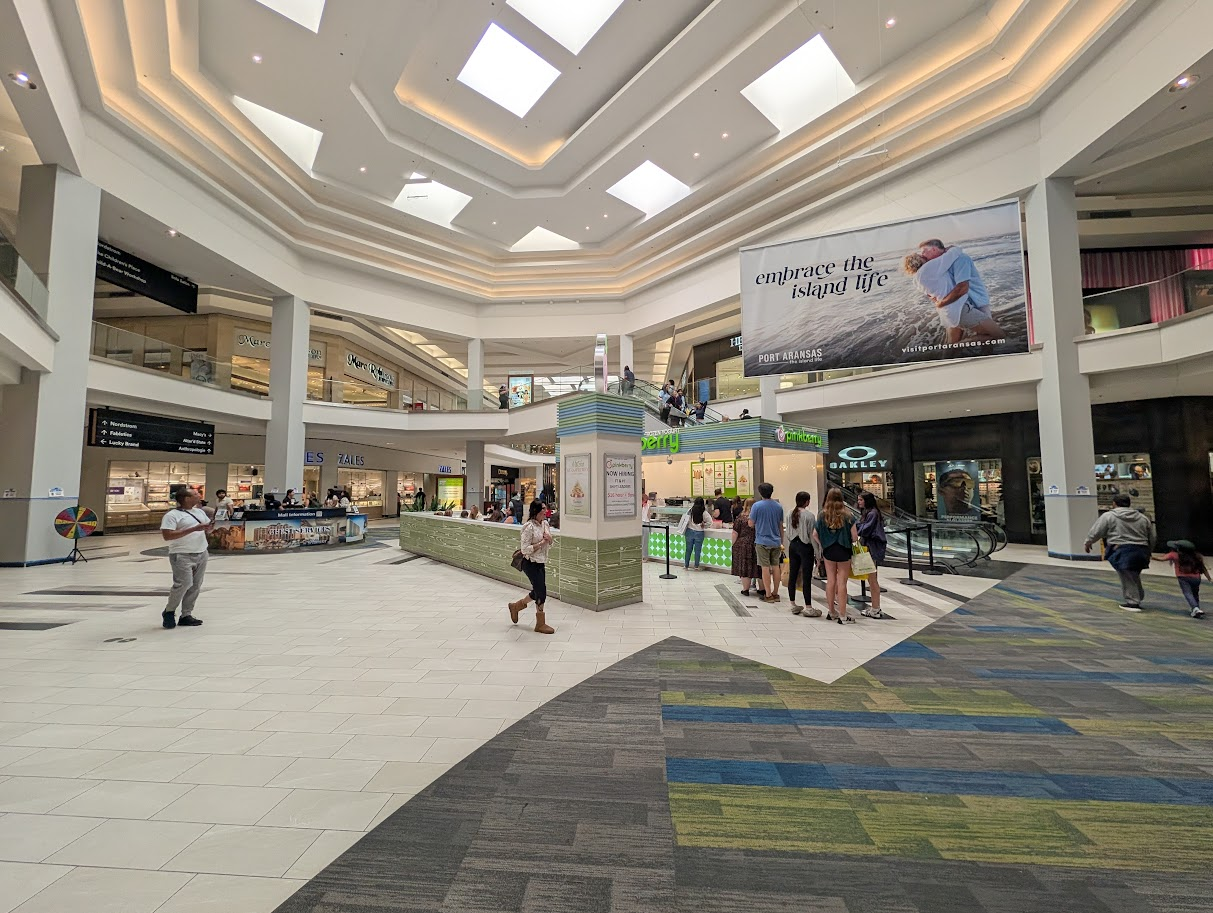
Center Court

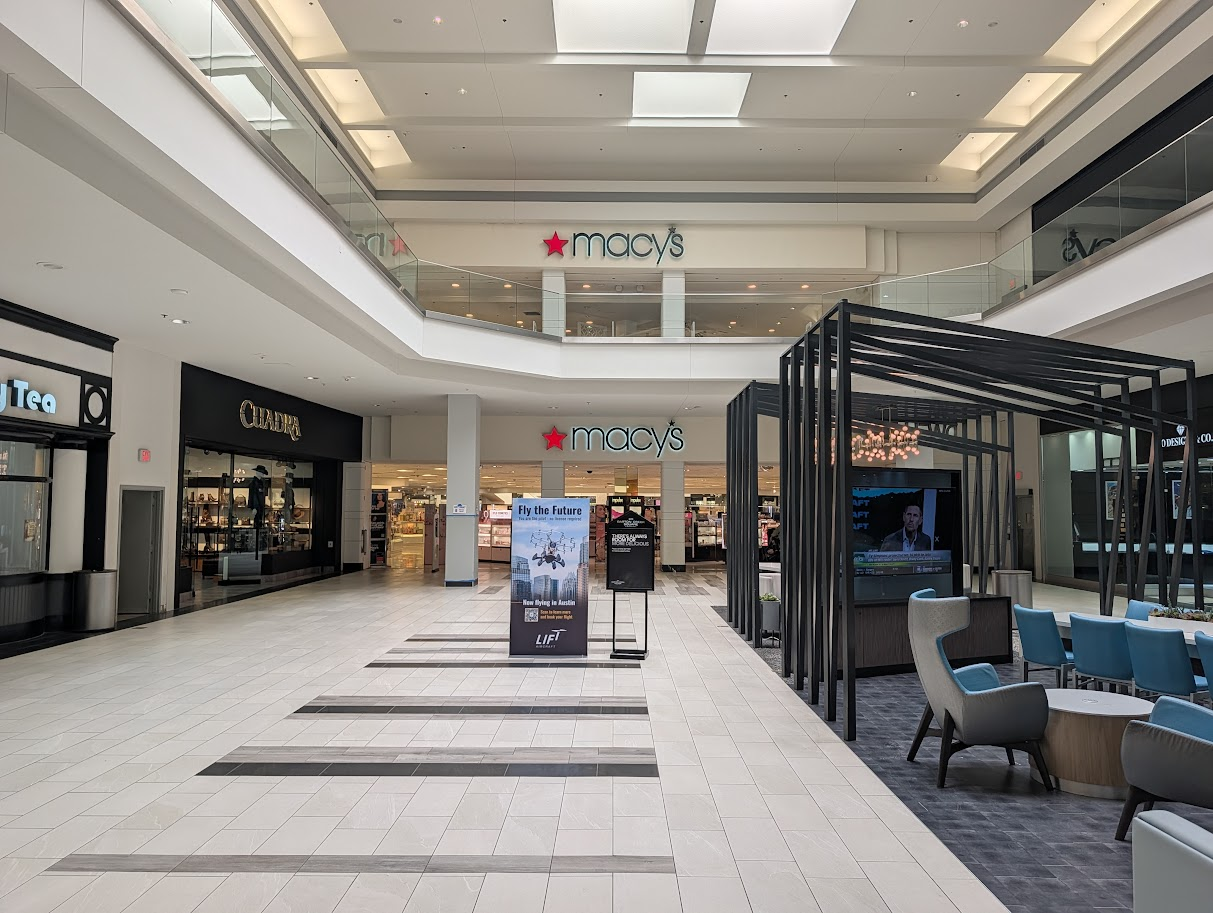
Macy's South Entrance

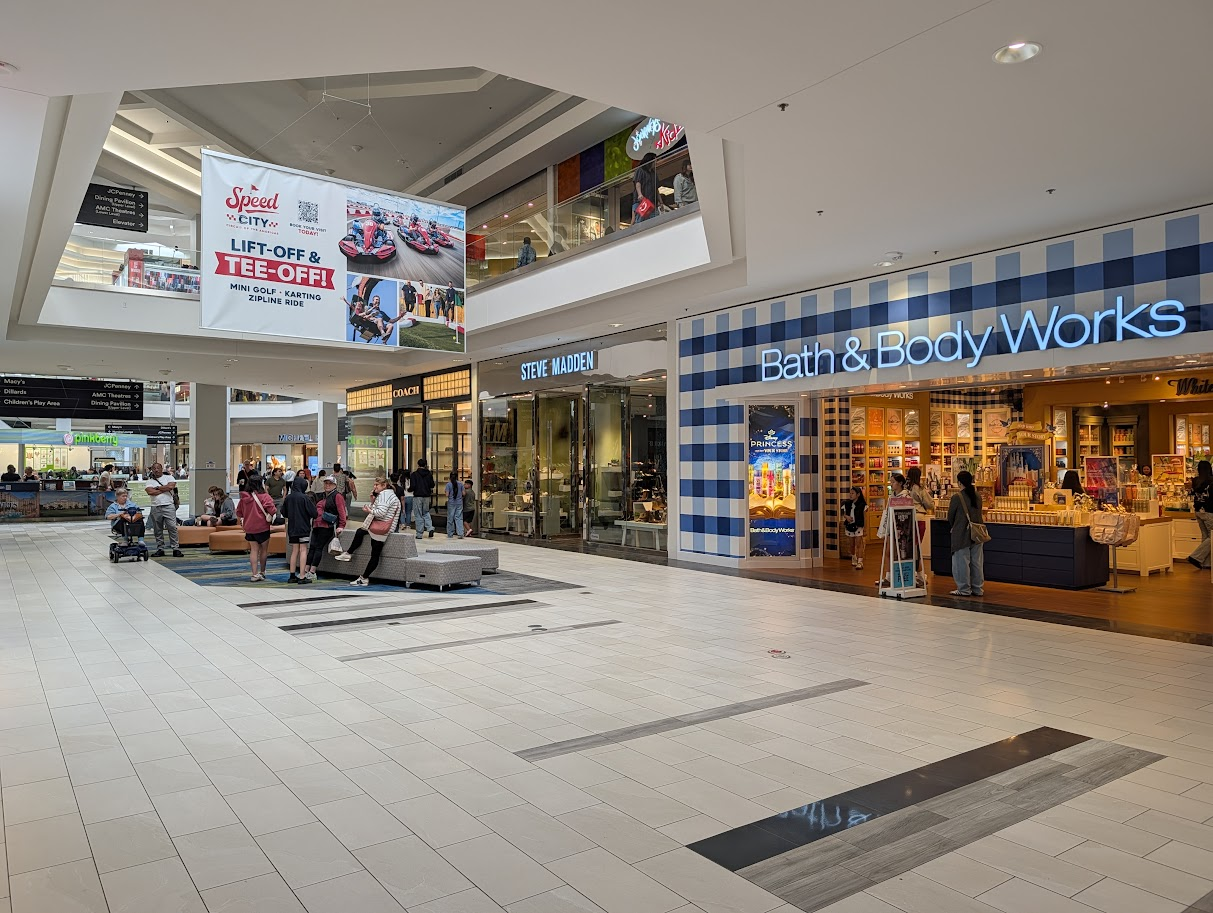
West Wing

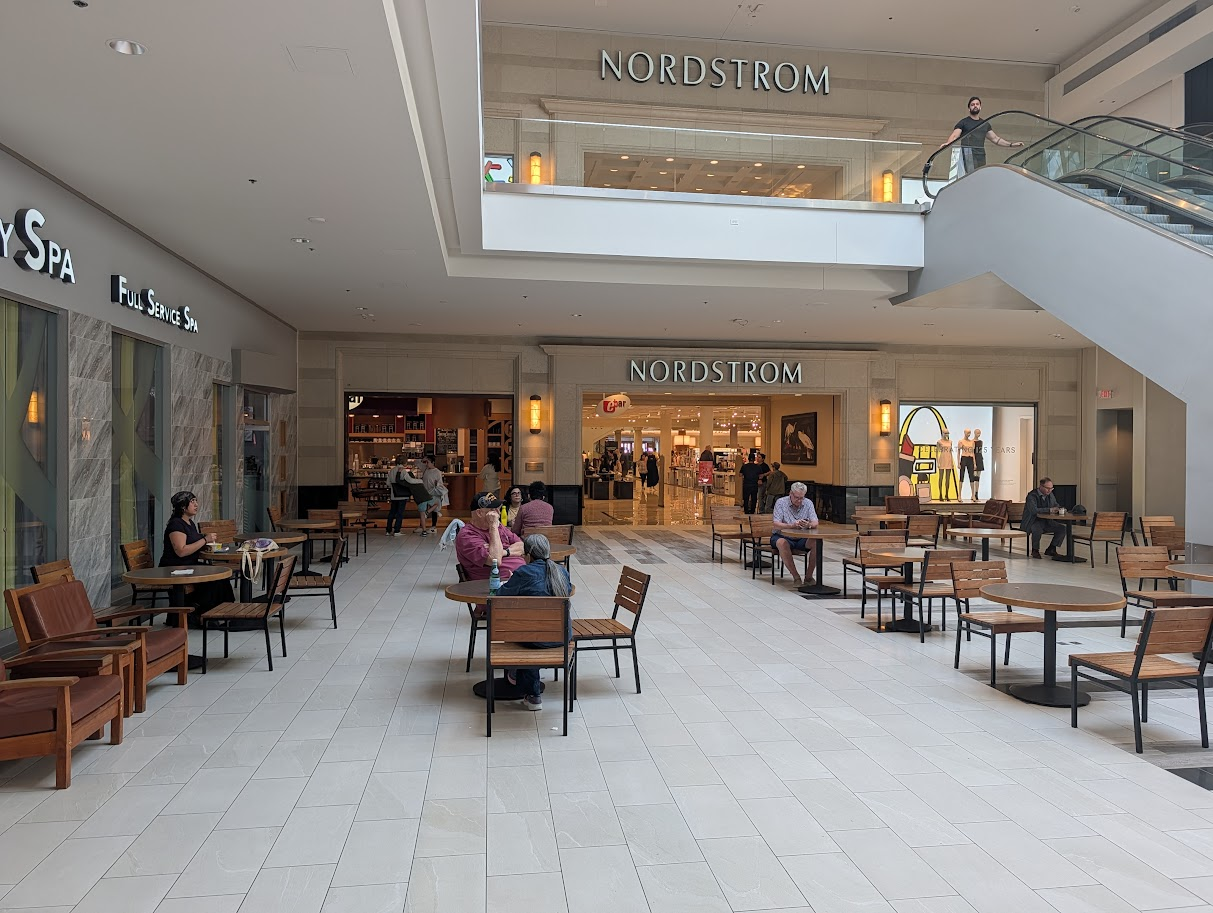
Nordstrom Entrance 2

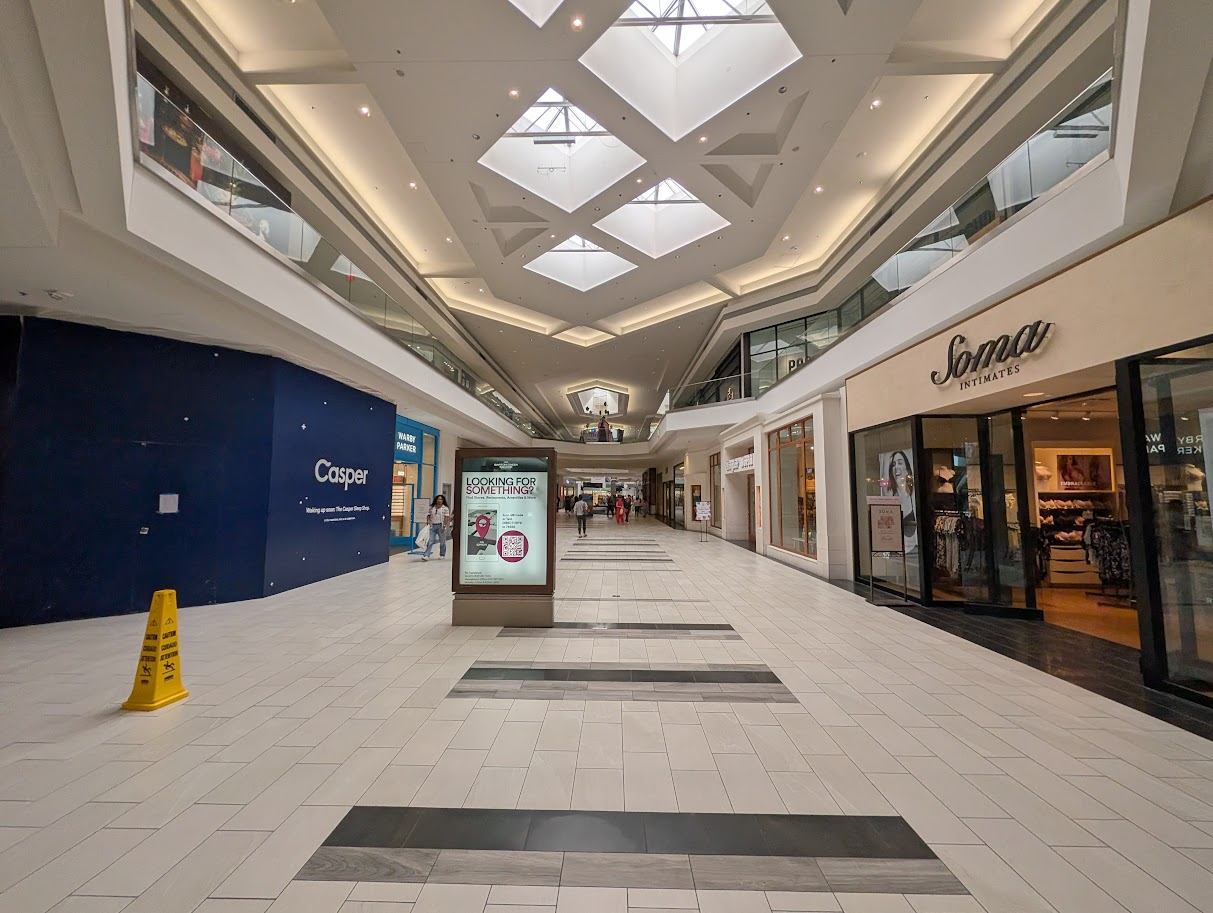
West Wing 2

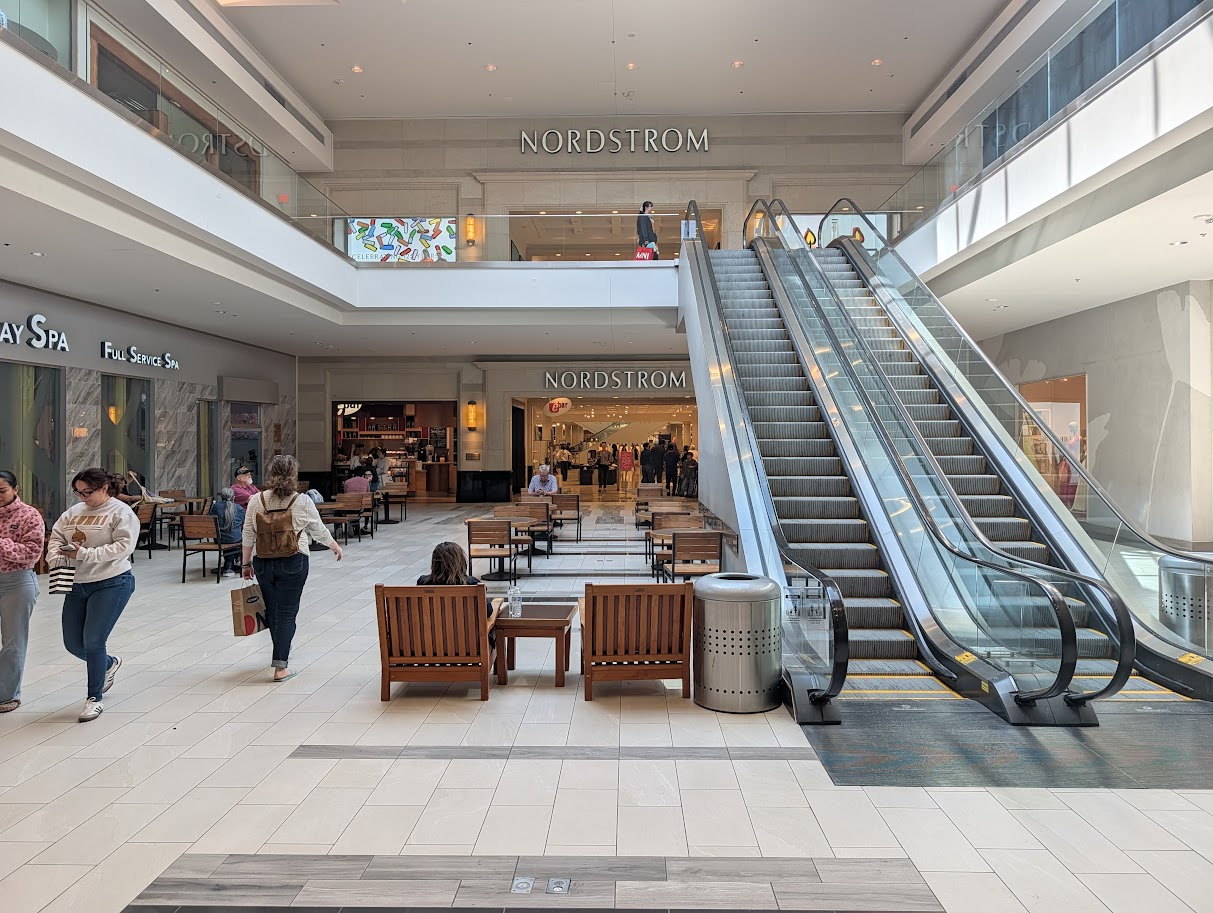
Nordstrom Entrance

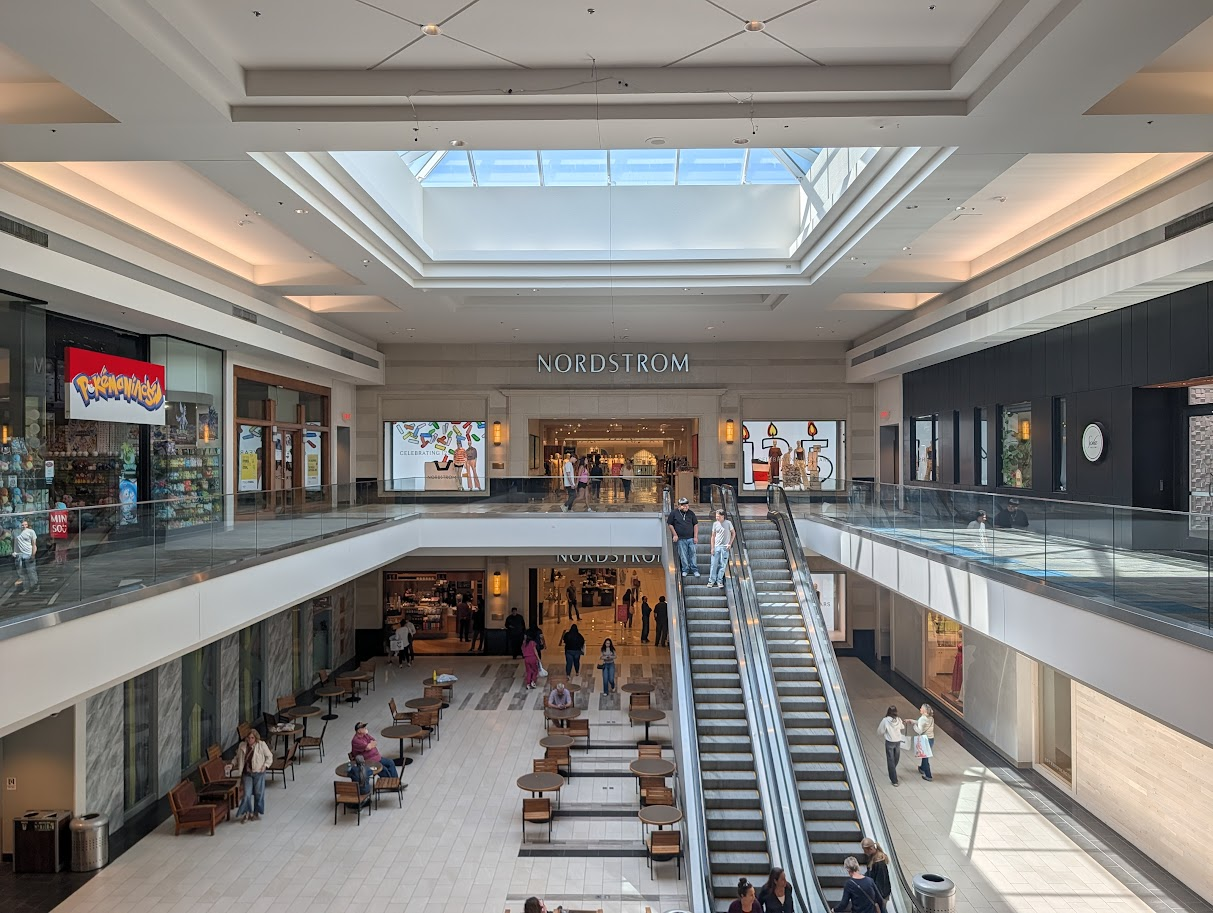
Nordstrom Entrance

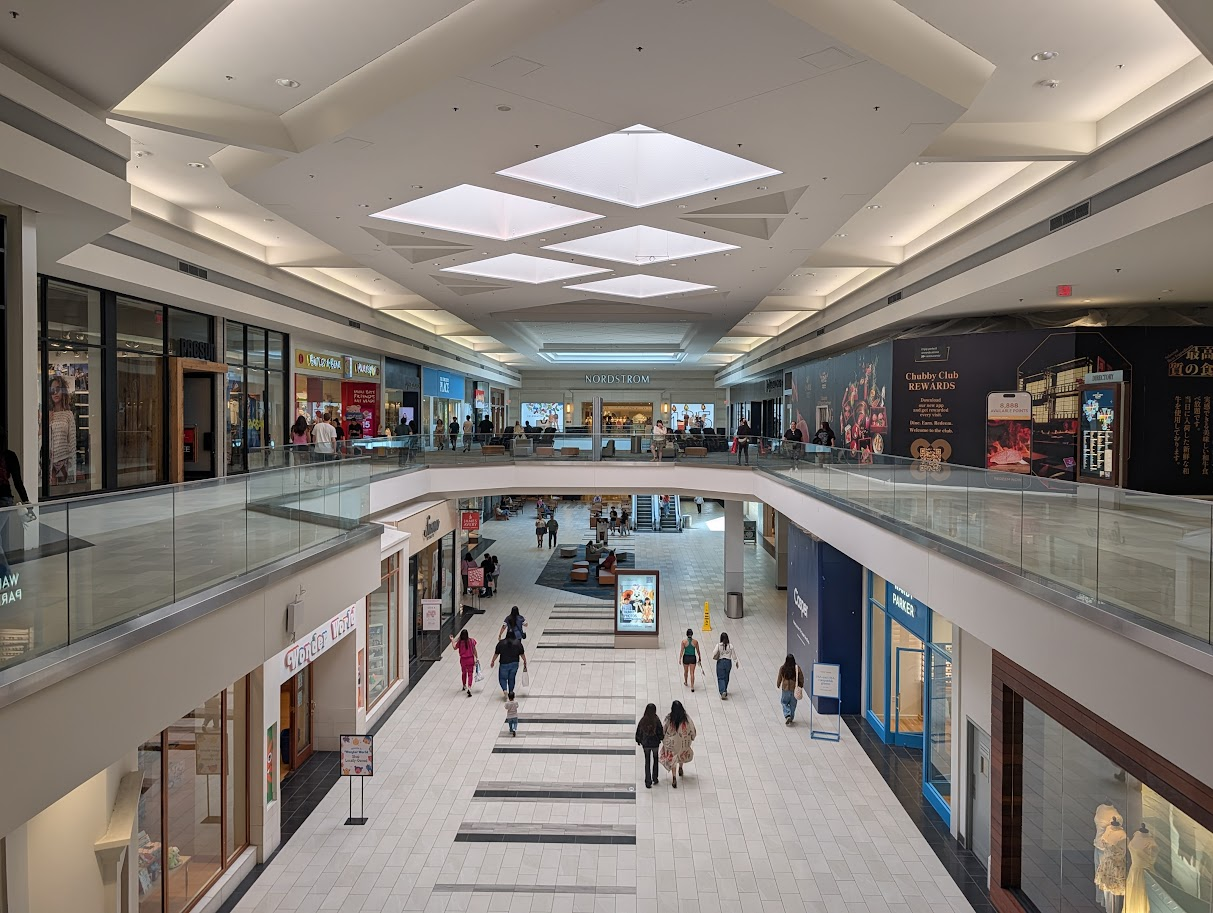
West Wing

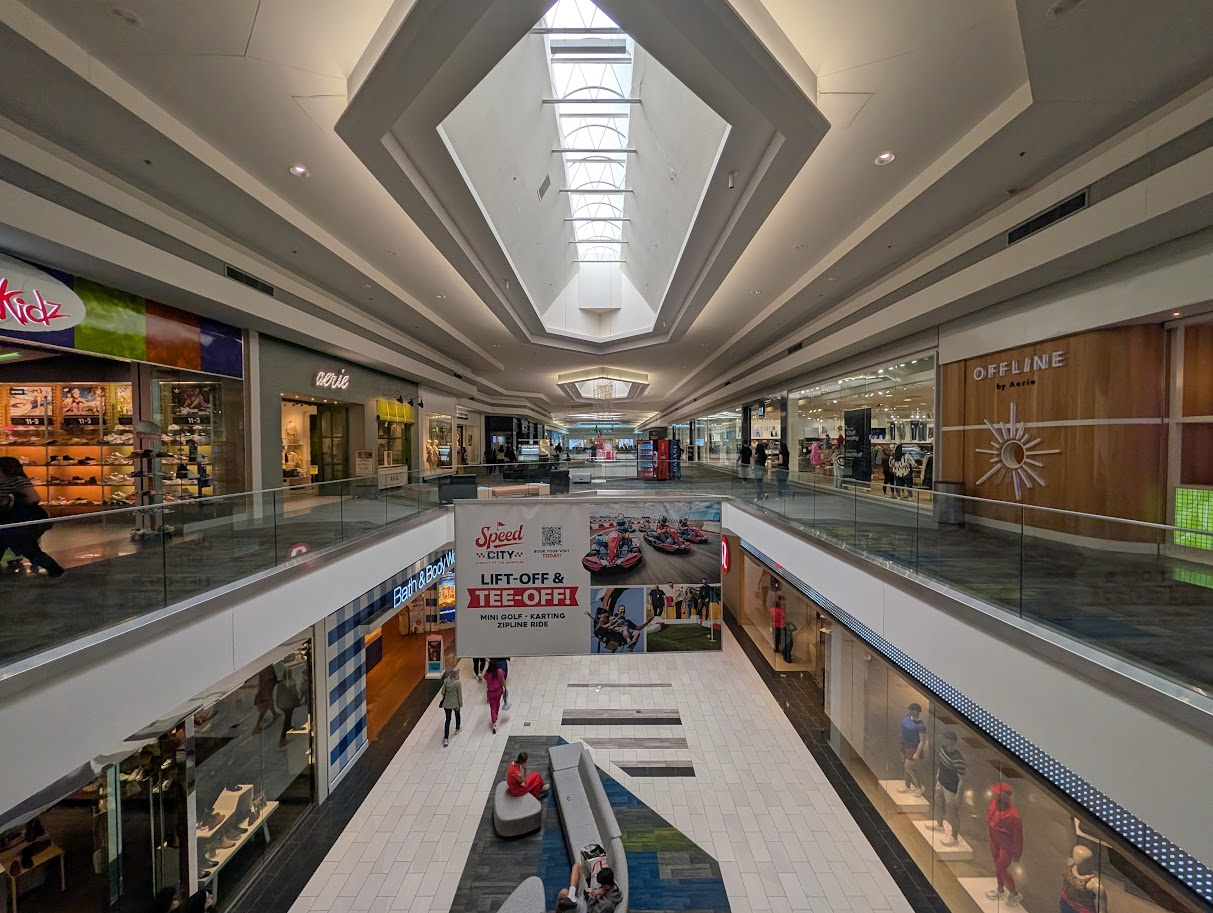
West Wing

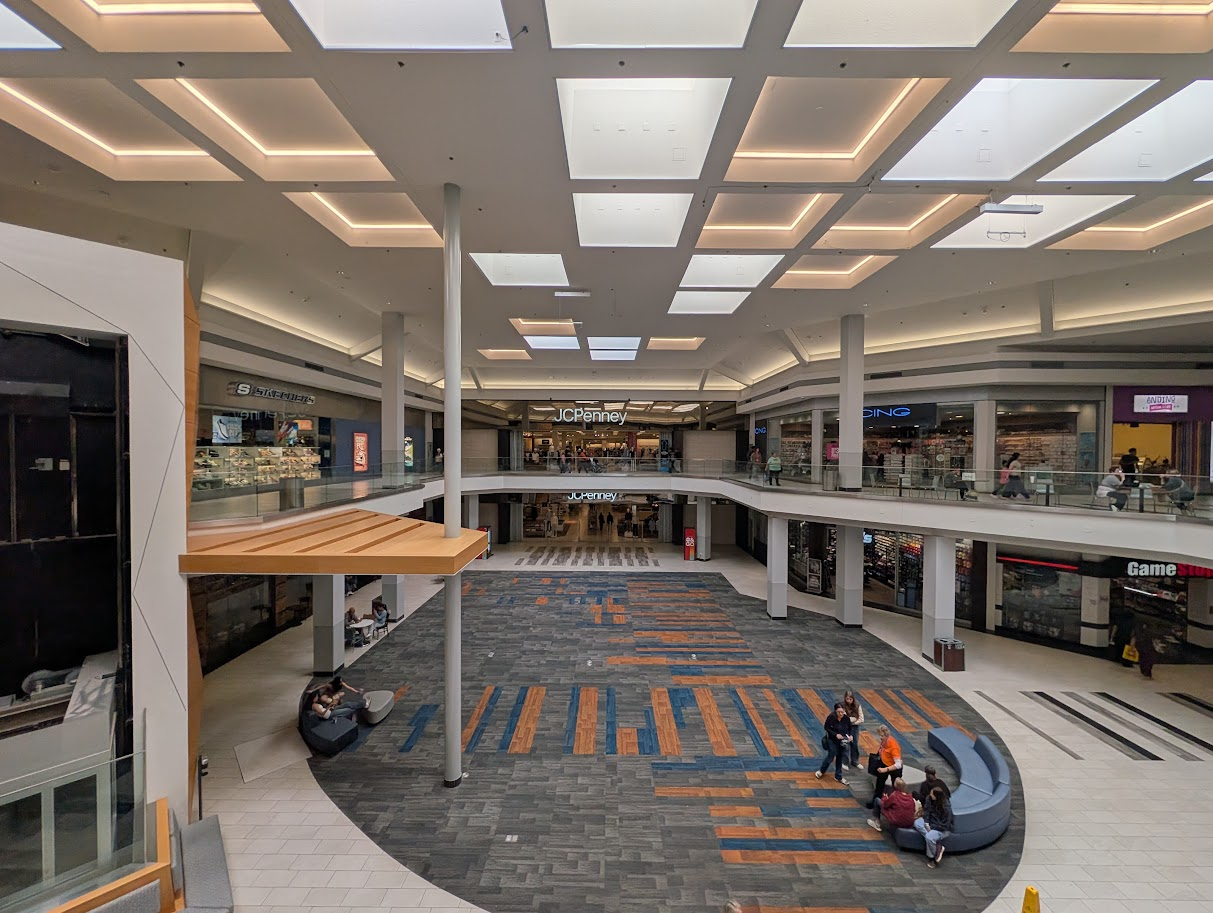
South Court

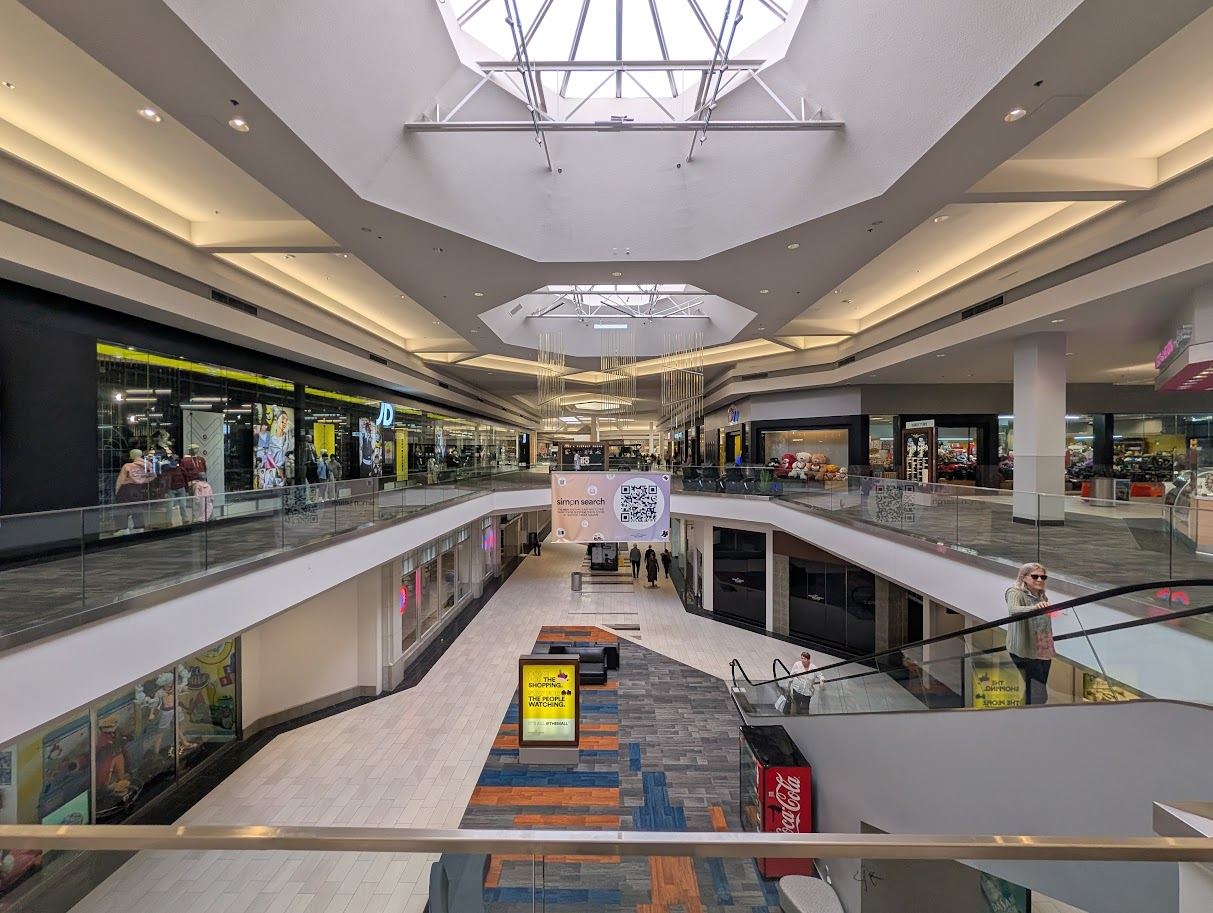
Sears Court

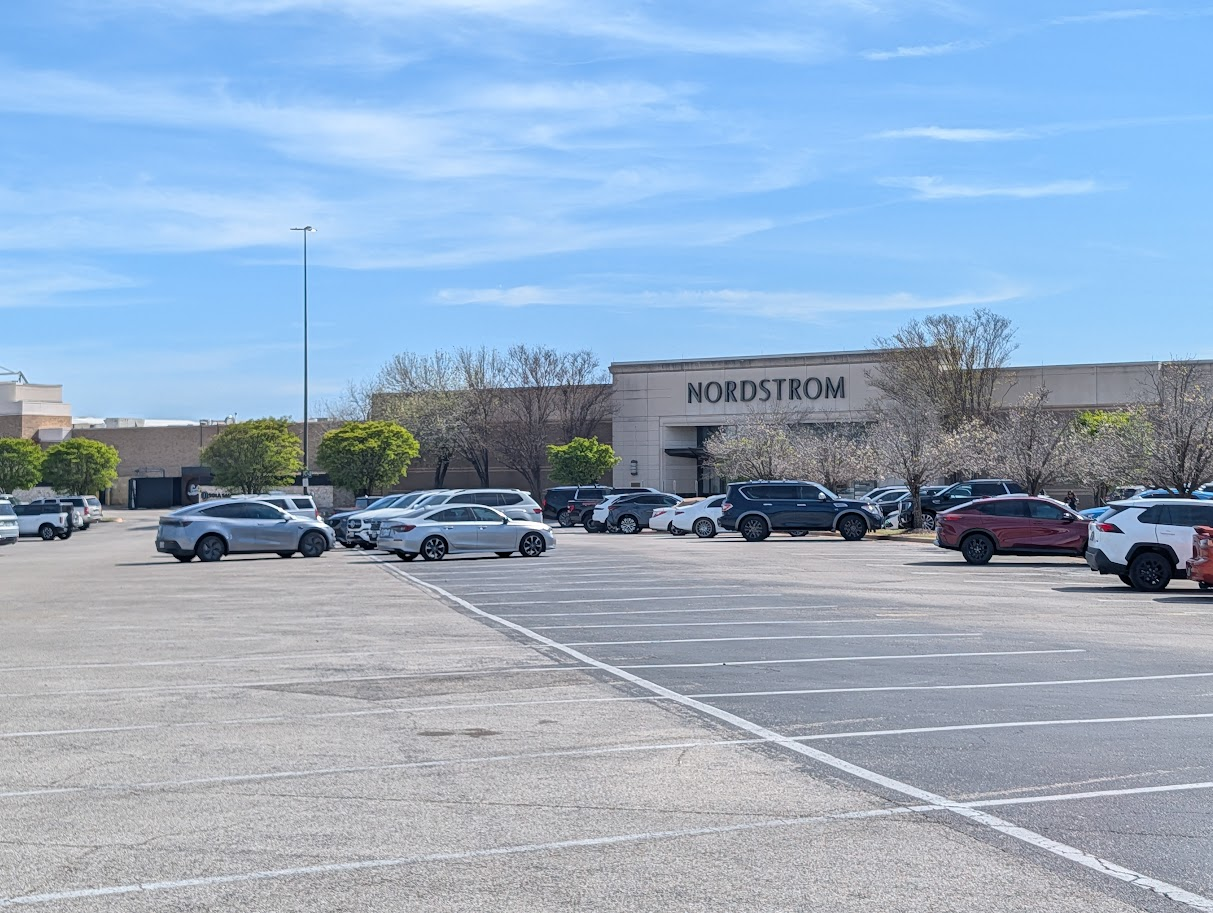
Nordstrom Northwest Entrance

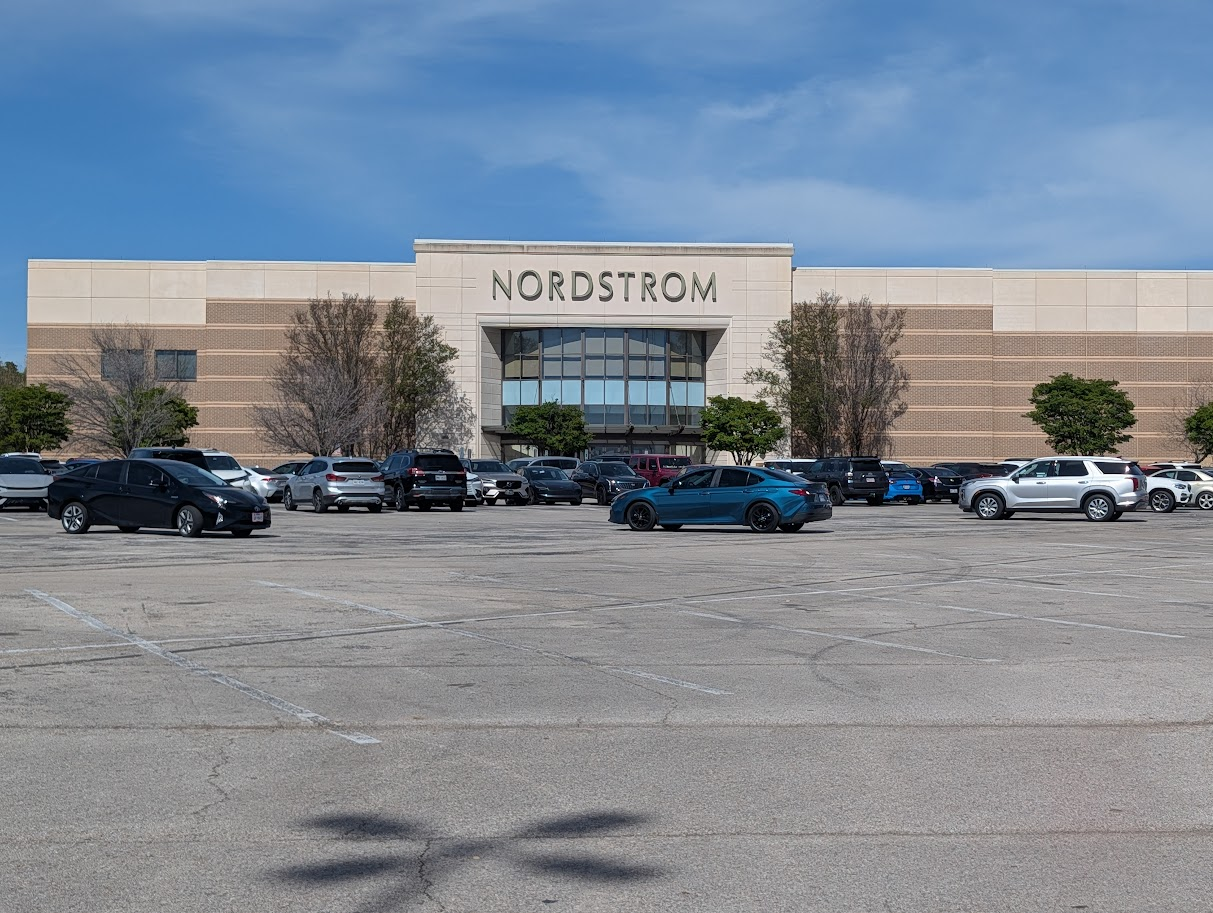
Nordstrom South Entrance

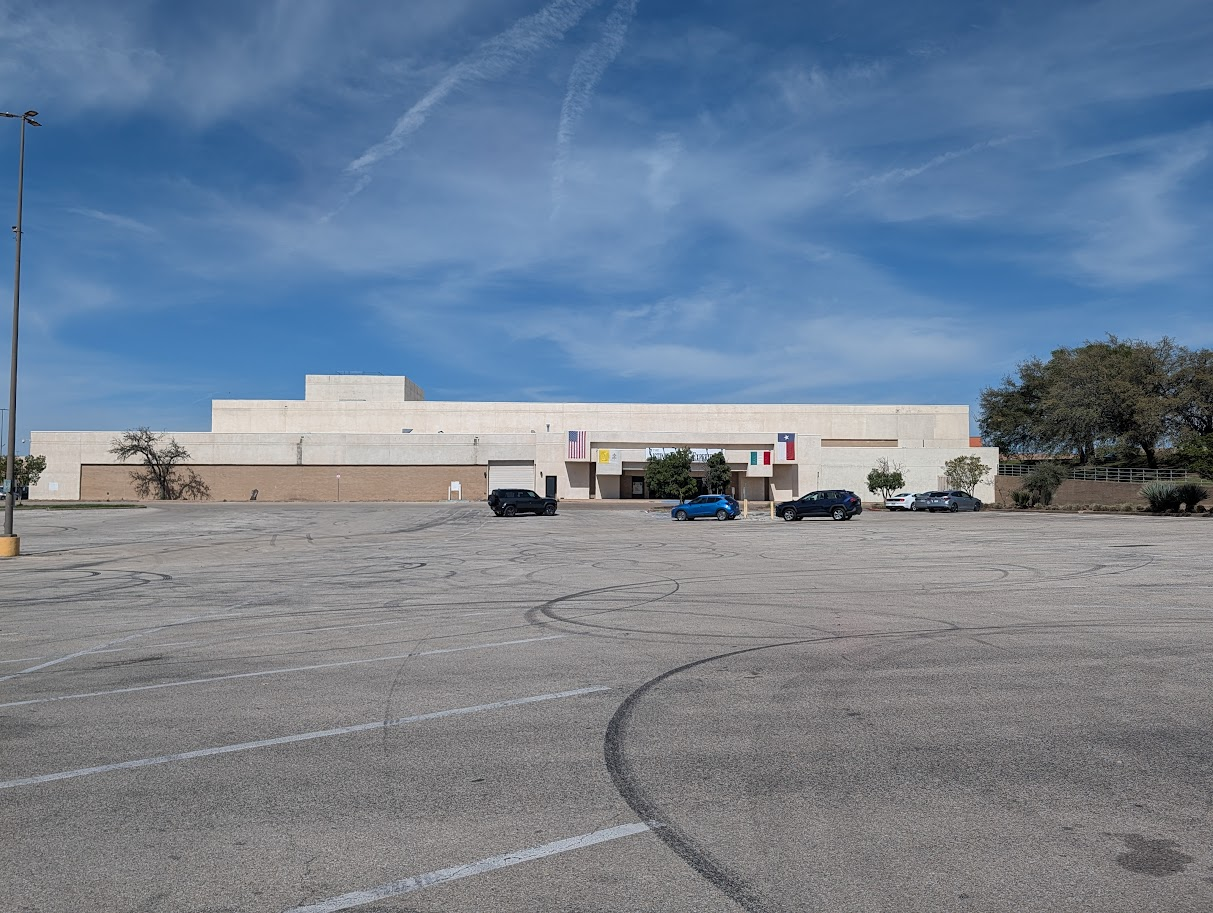
South Entrance to Former Sears

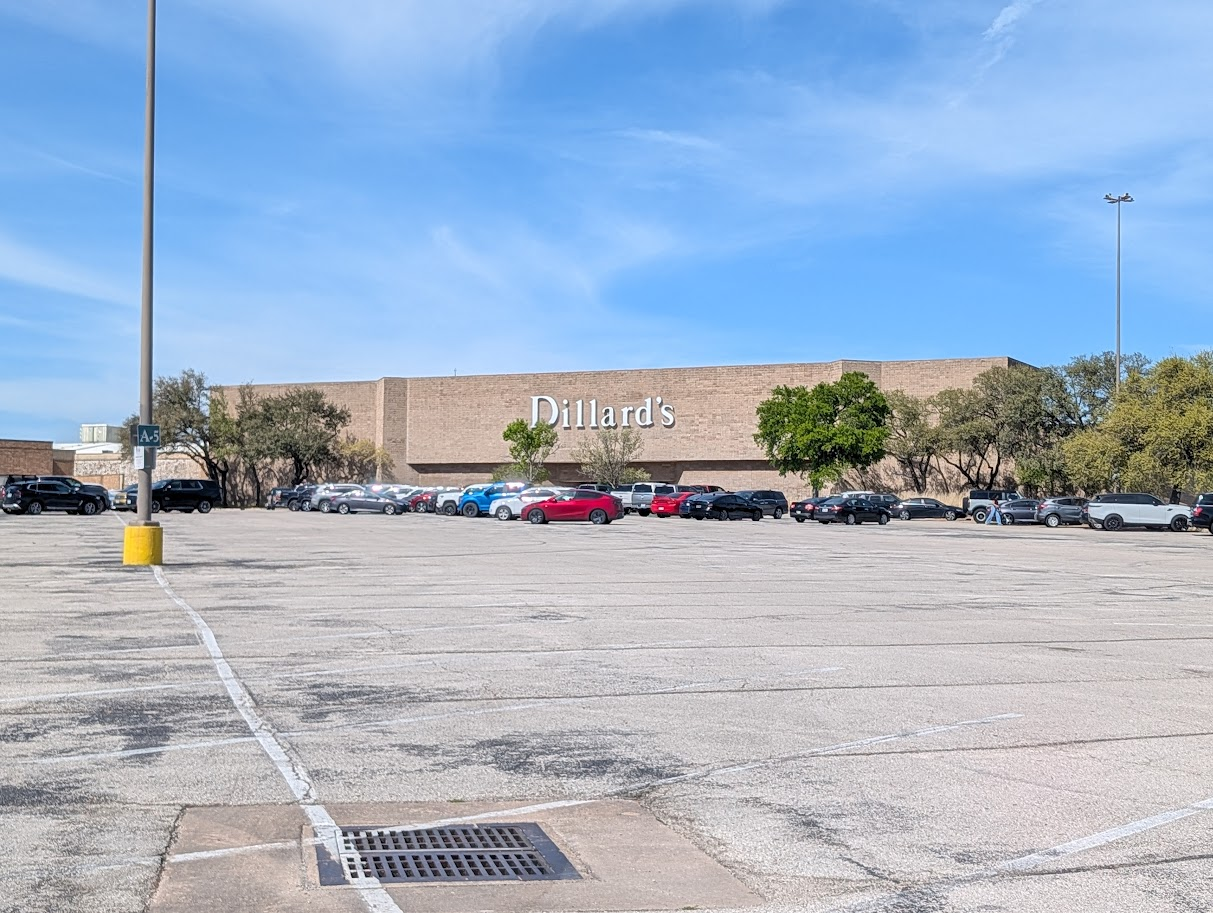
Dillard's South Entrance

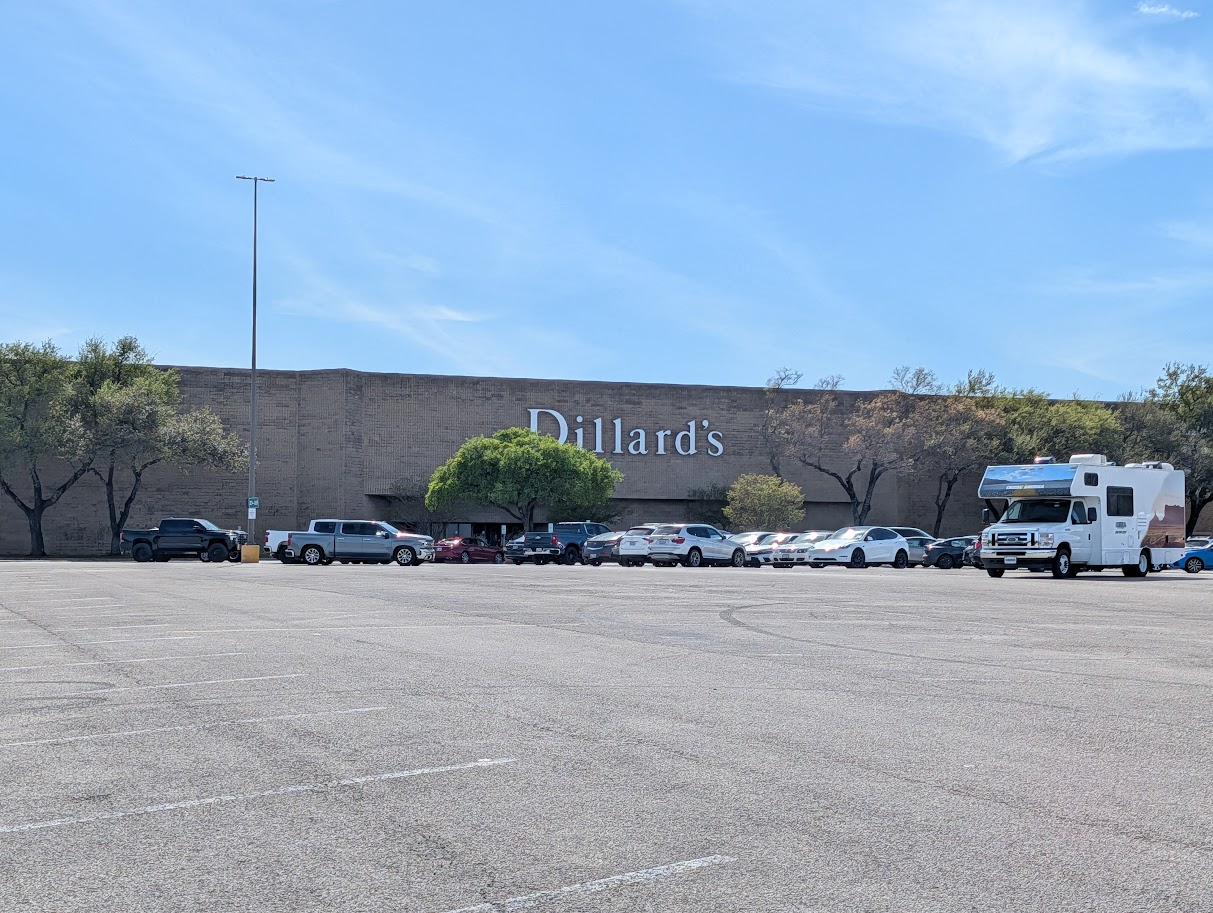
Dillard's North Entrance

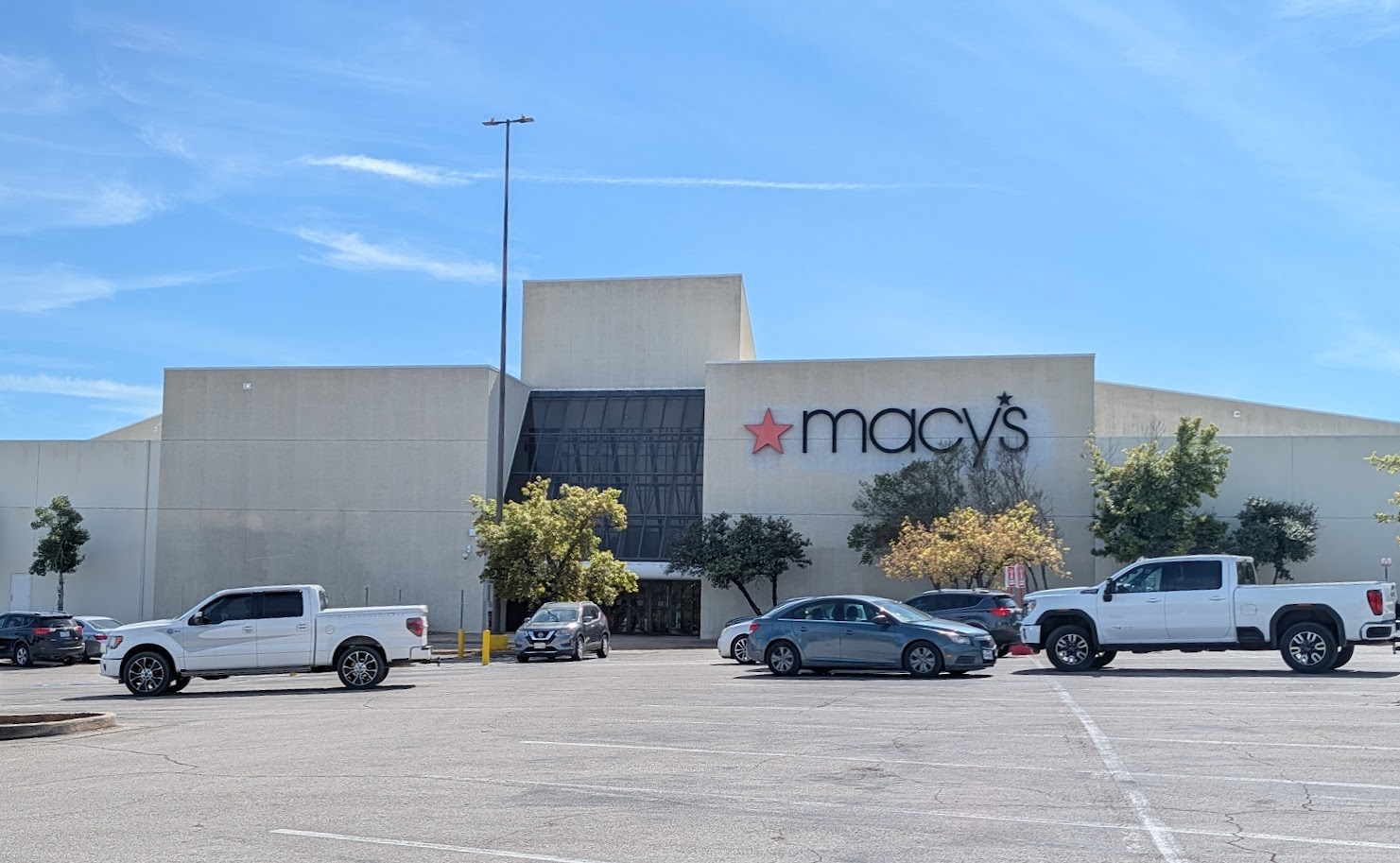
Macy's North Entrance

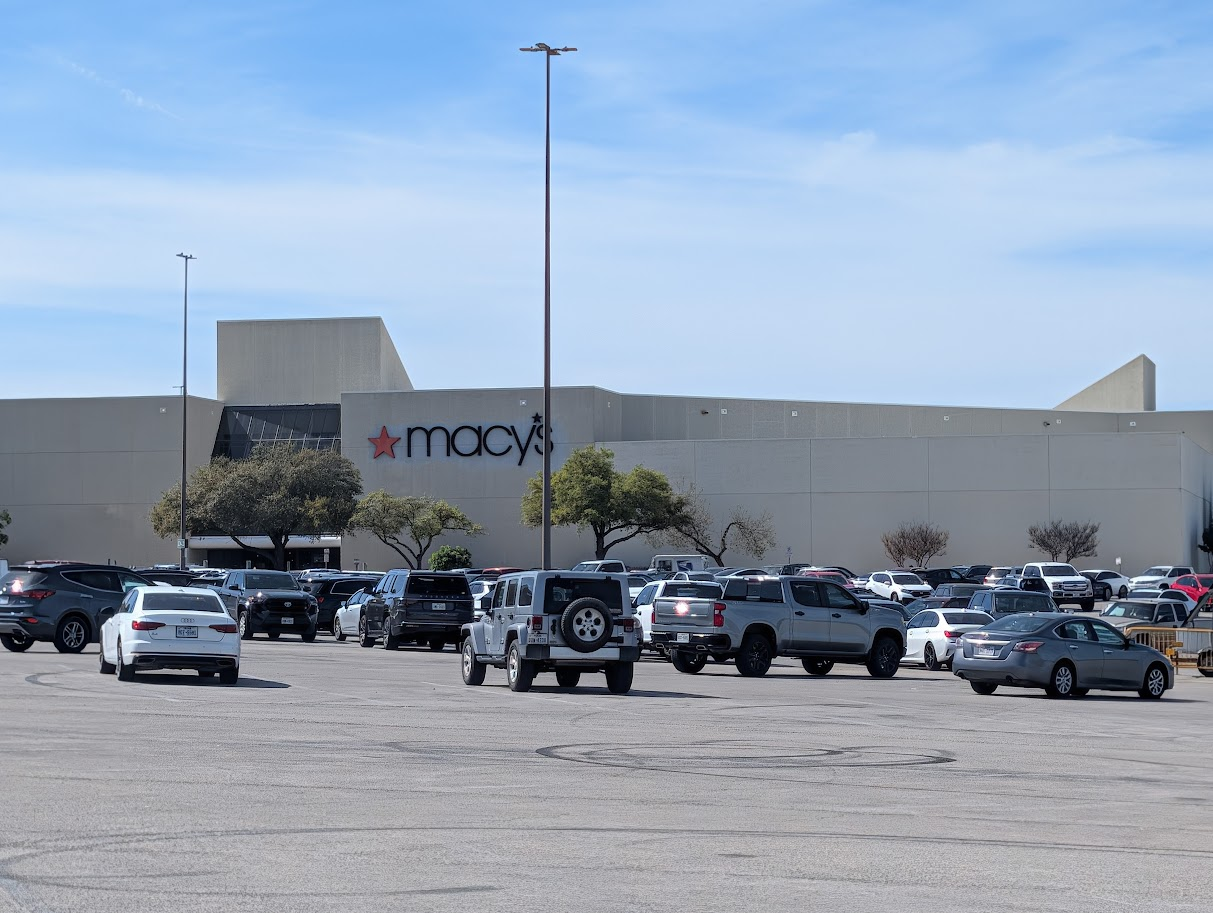
Macy's East Entrance

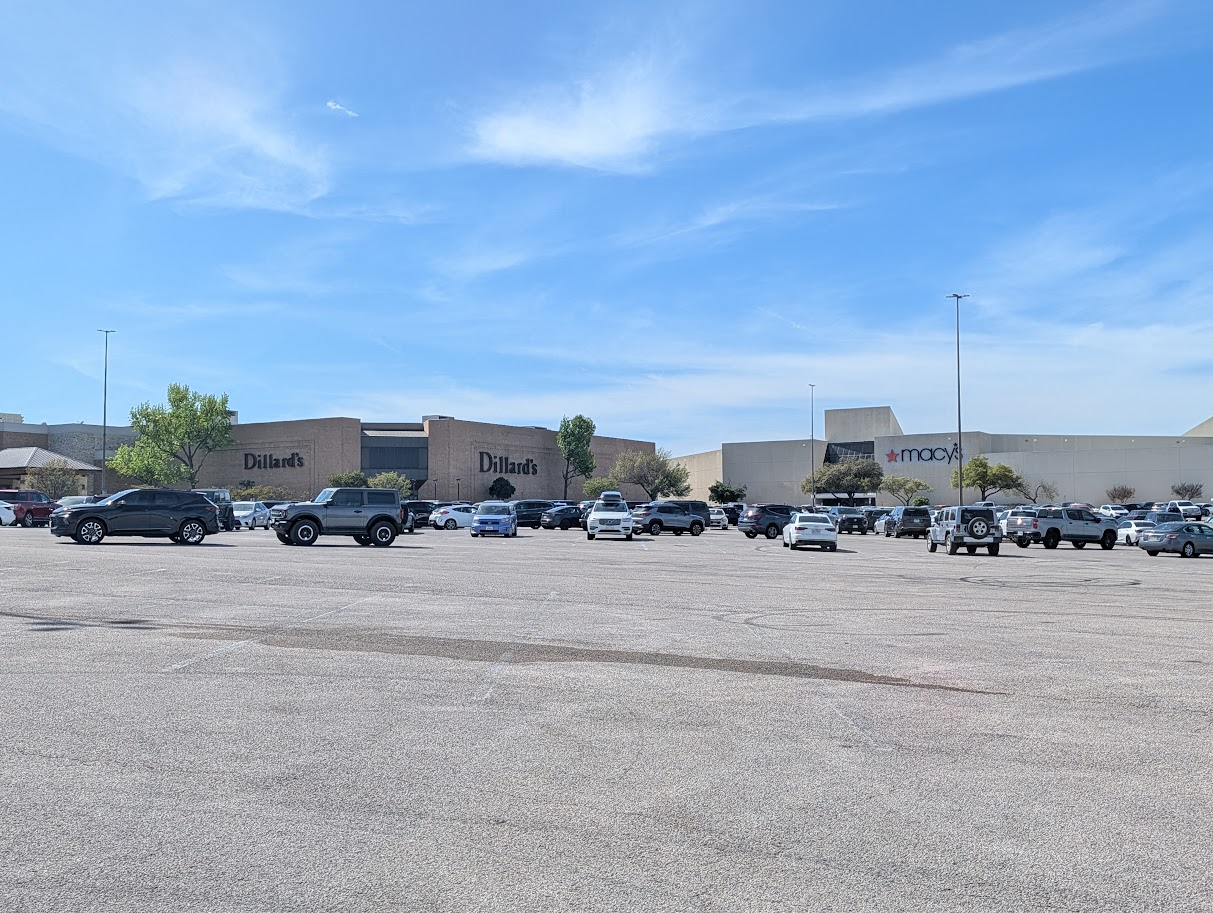
Barton Creek Square Northeast Vista

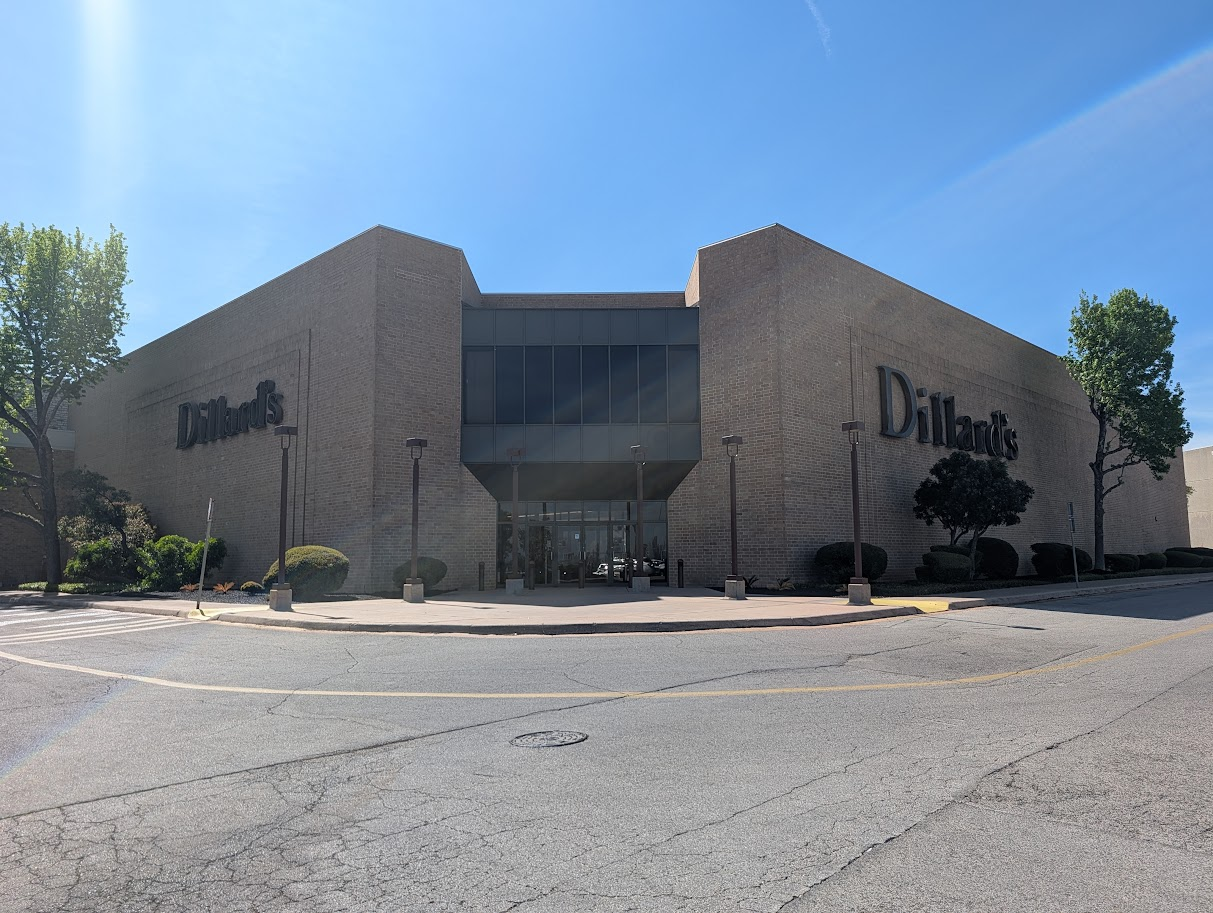
Dillard's Northeast Entrance

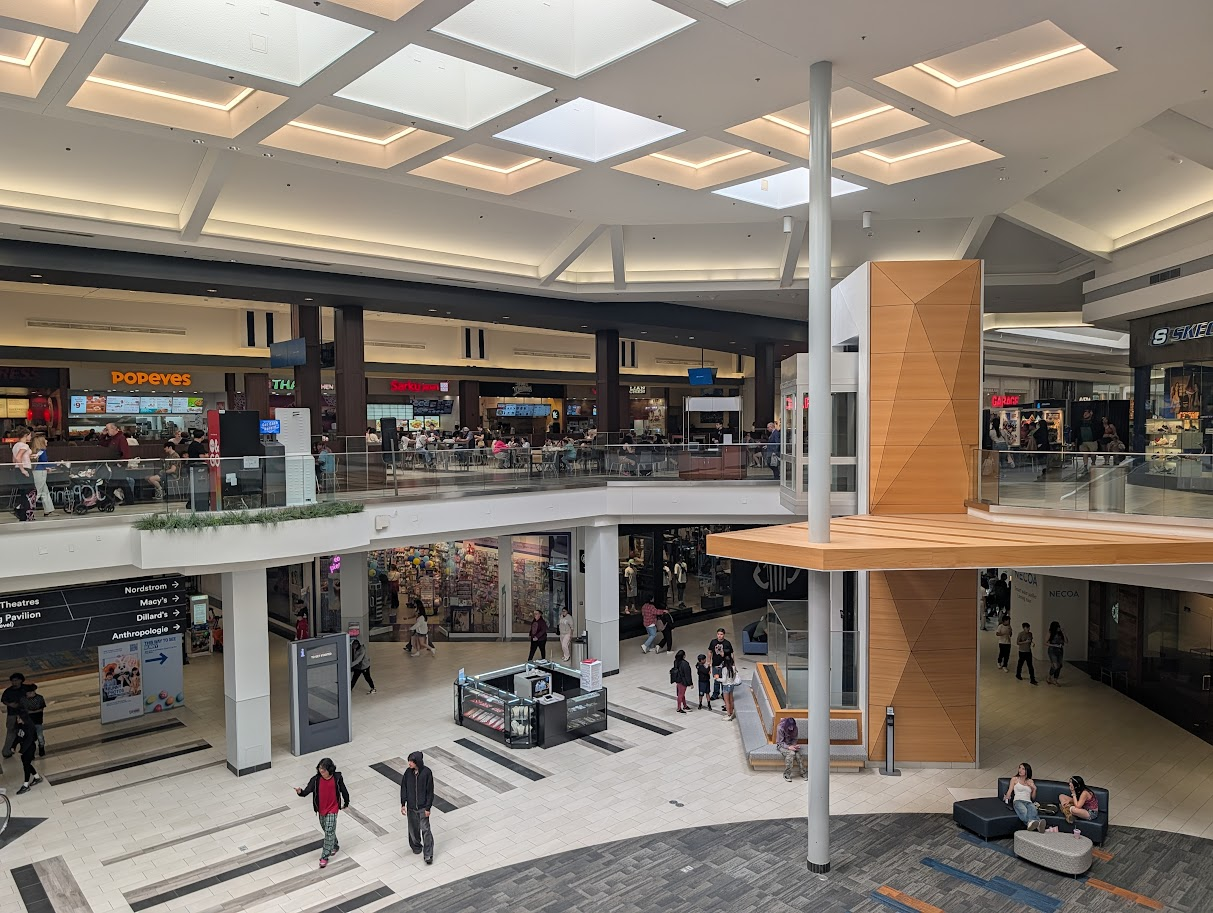
South Court and Food Court

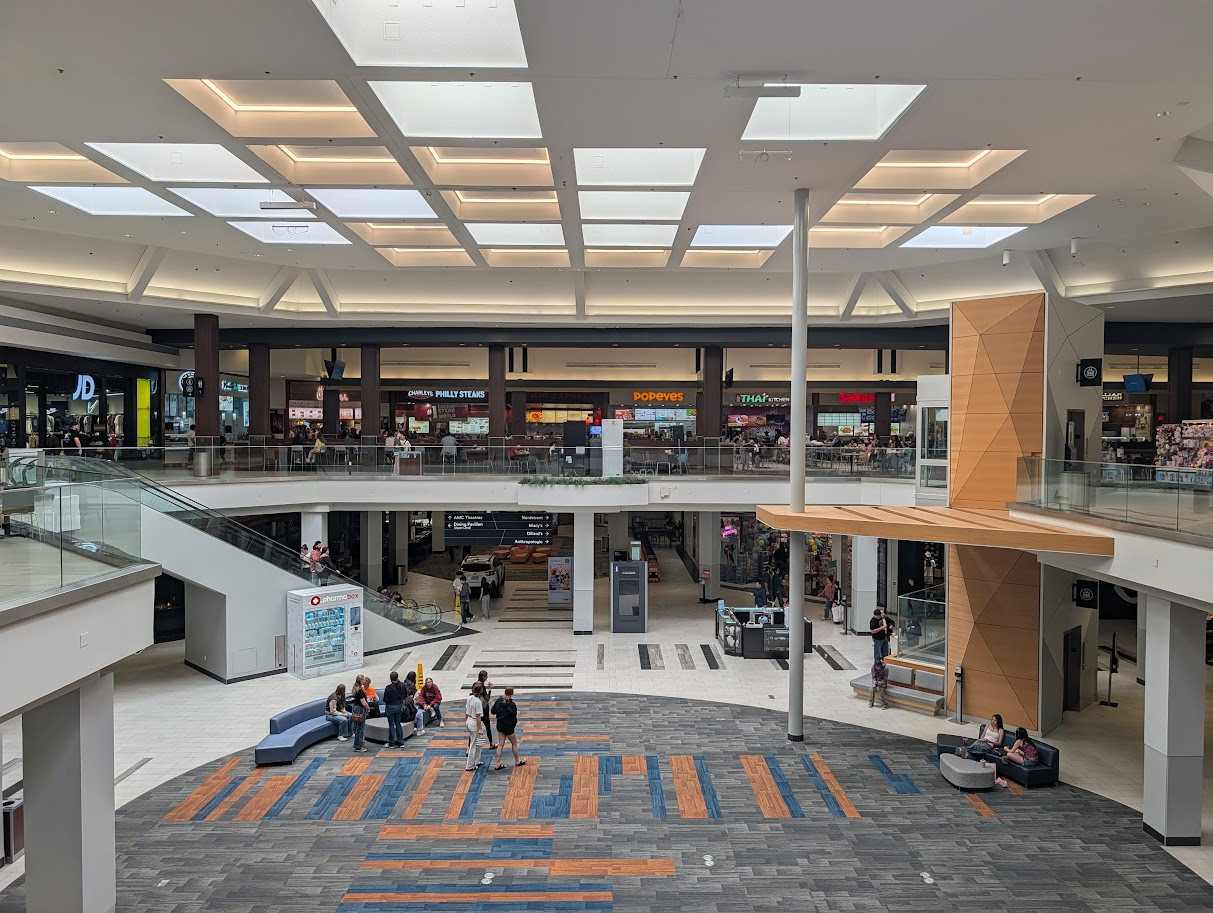
South Court

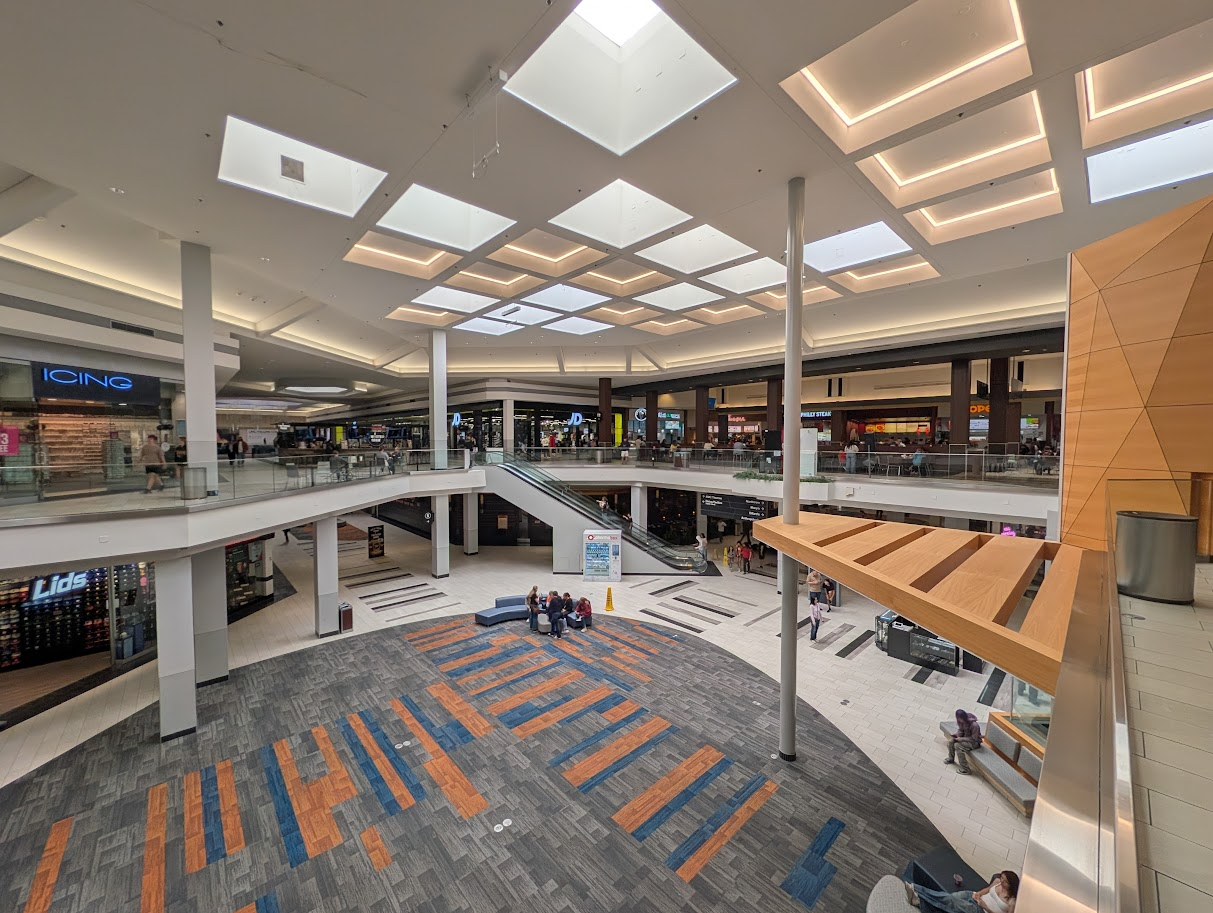
South Court

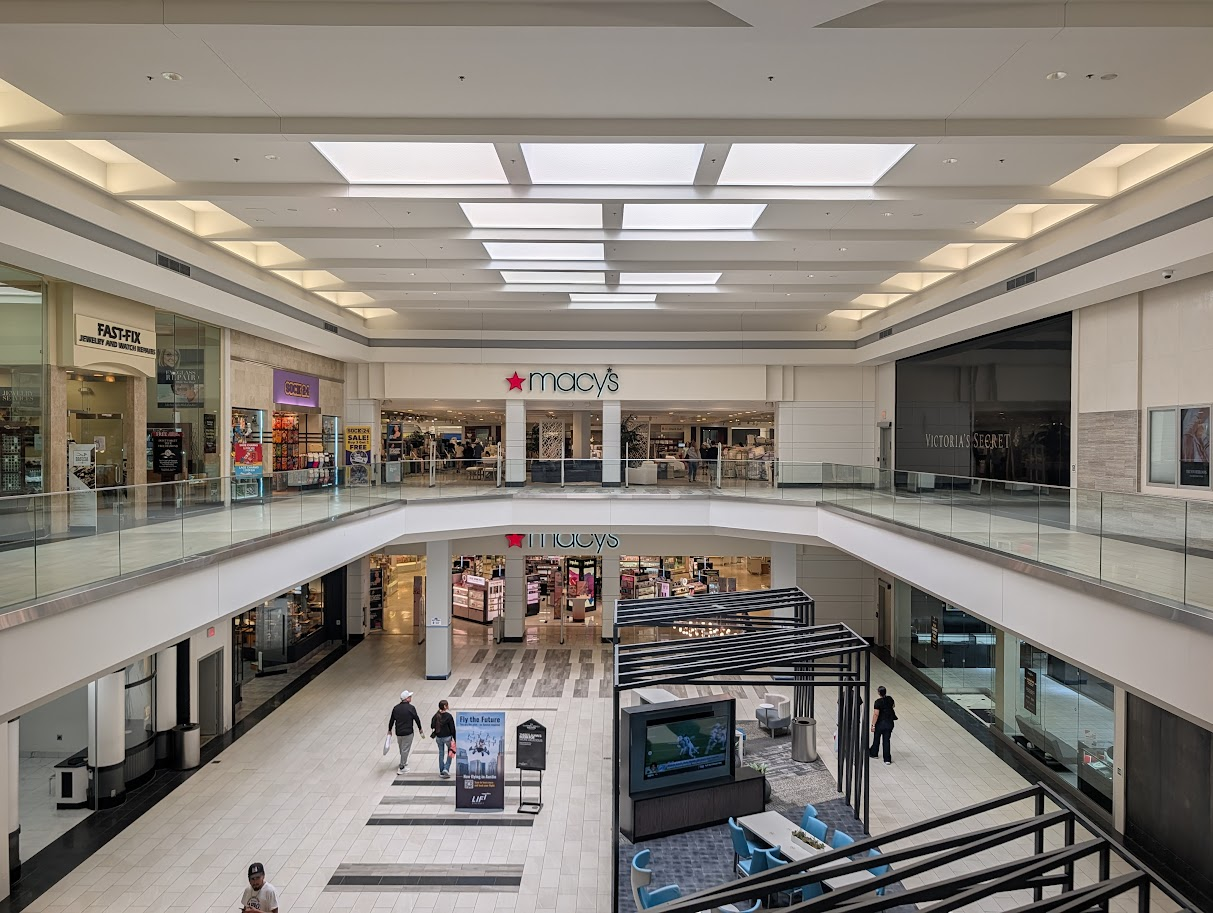
Macy's Entrance

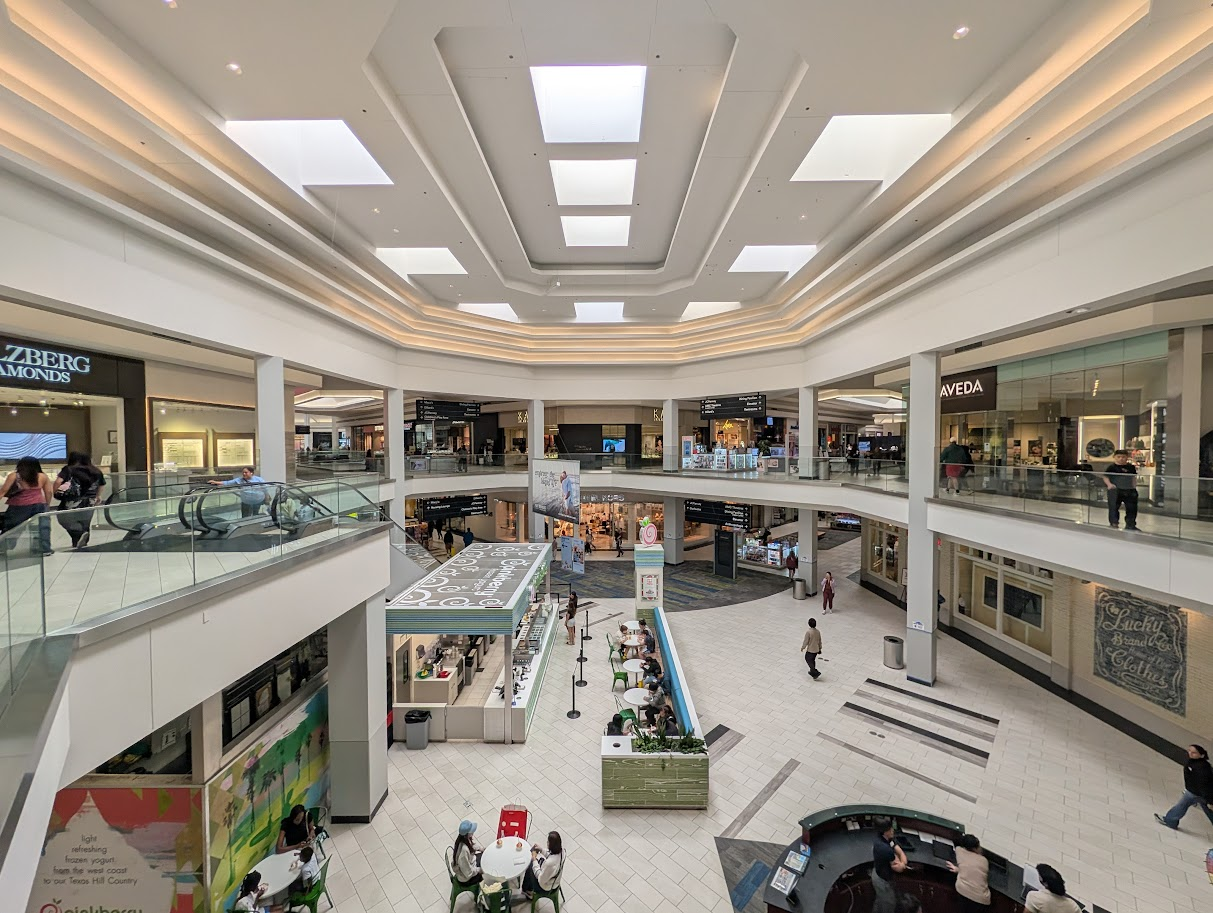
Center Court

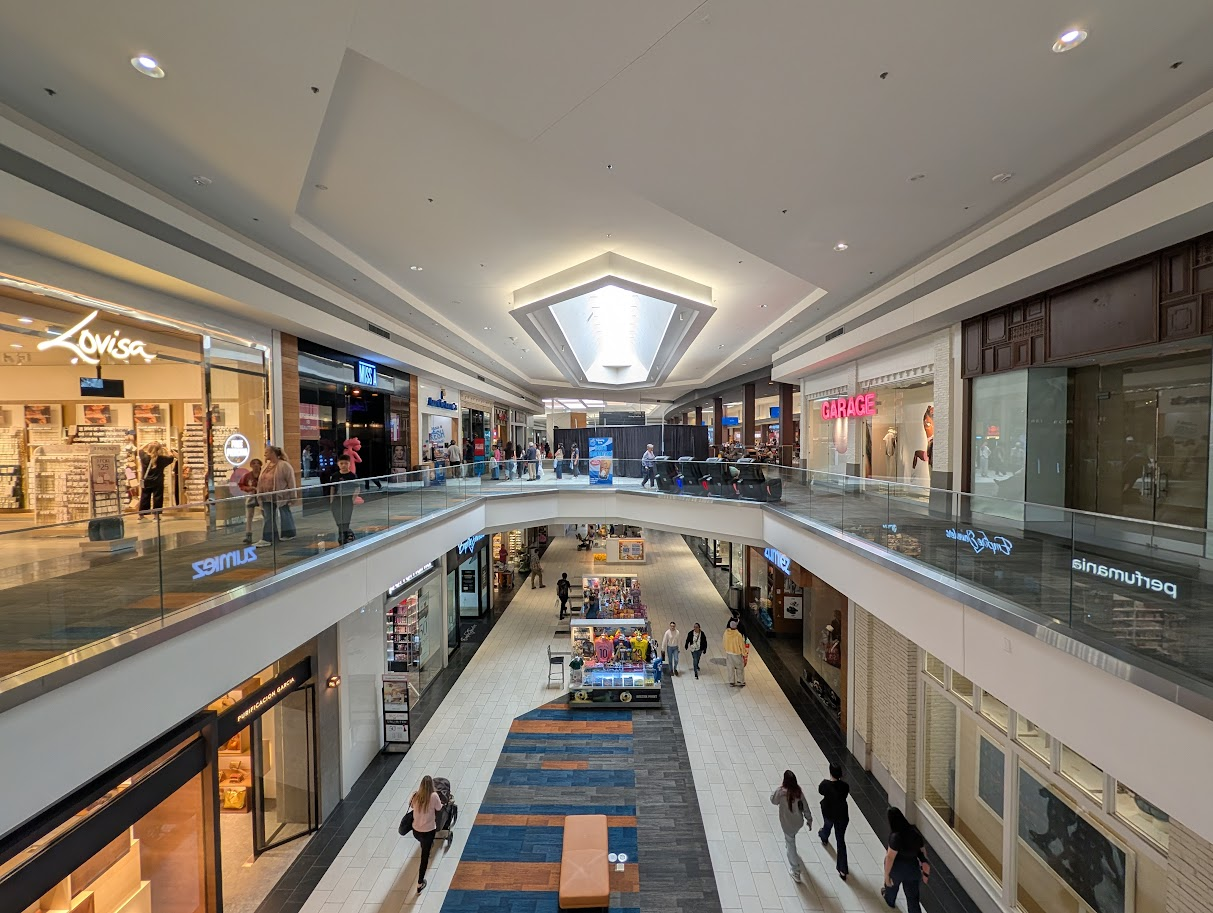
South Wing

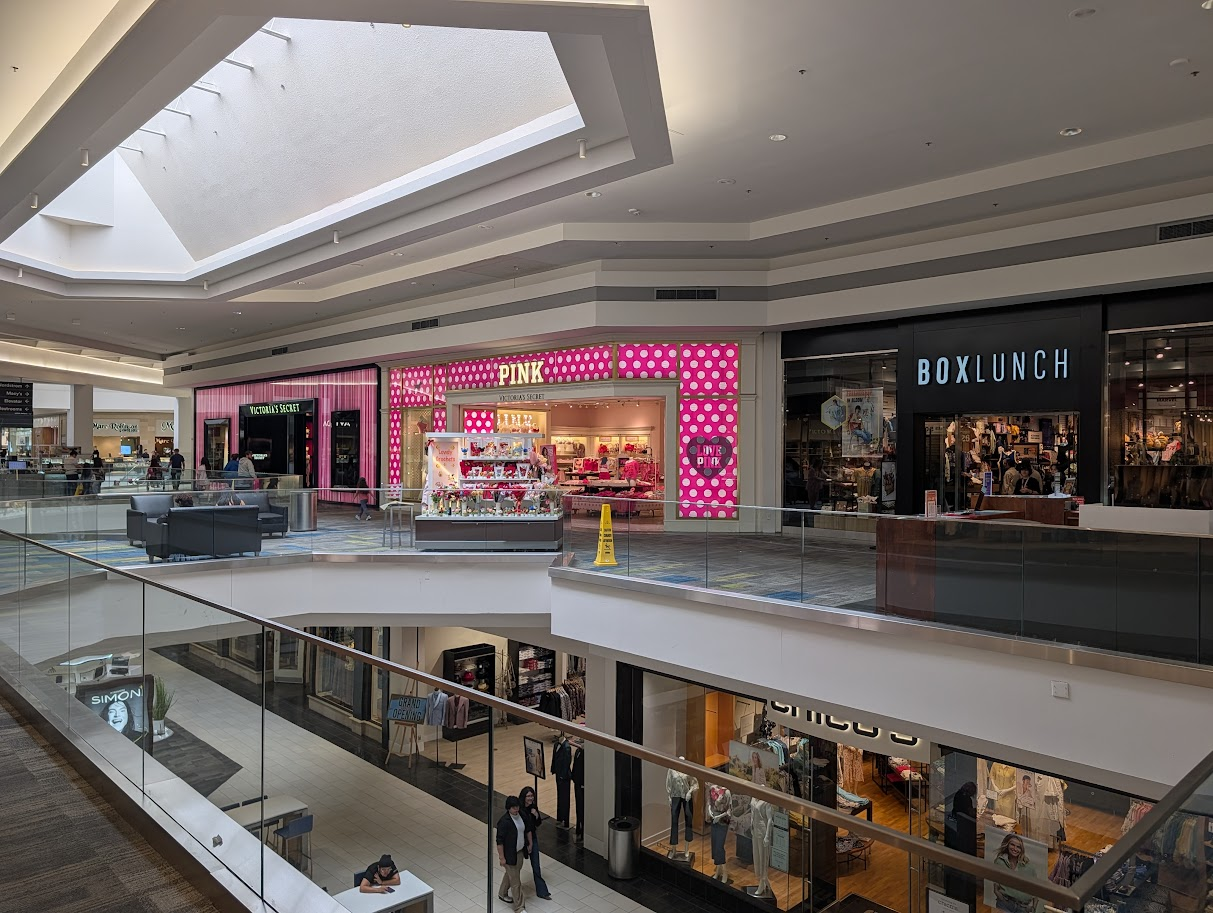
East Wing

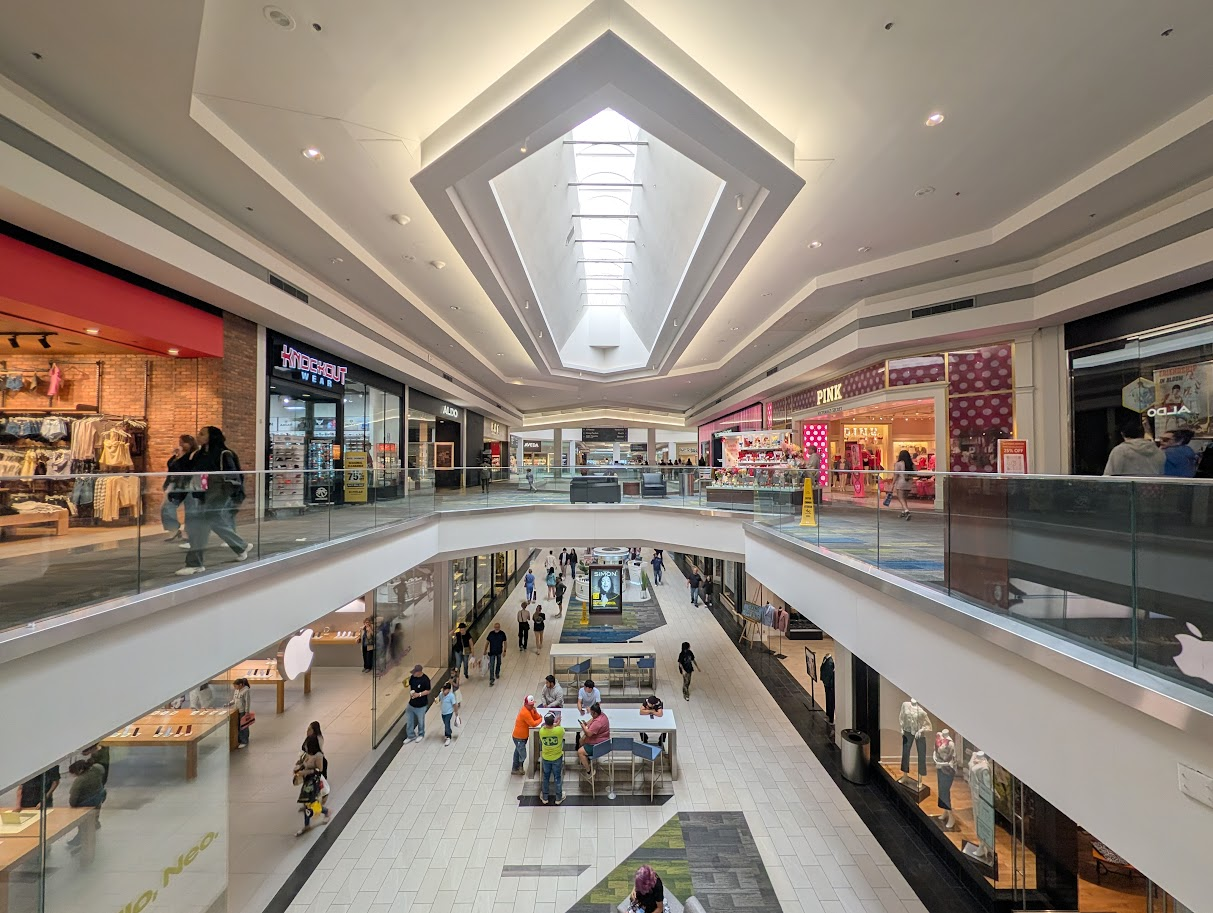
East Wing

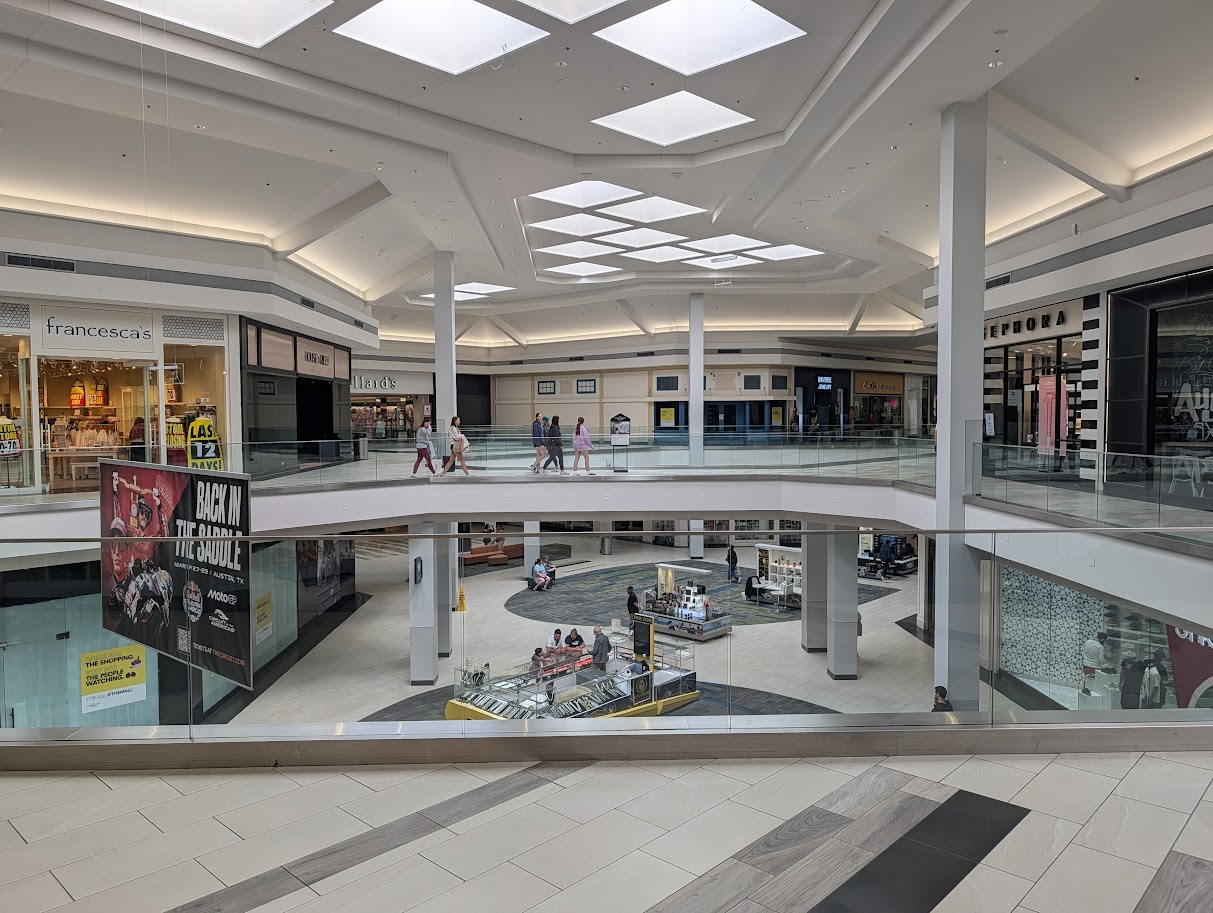
East Court

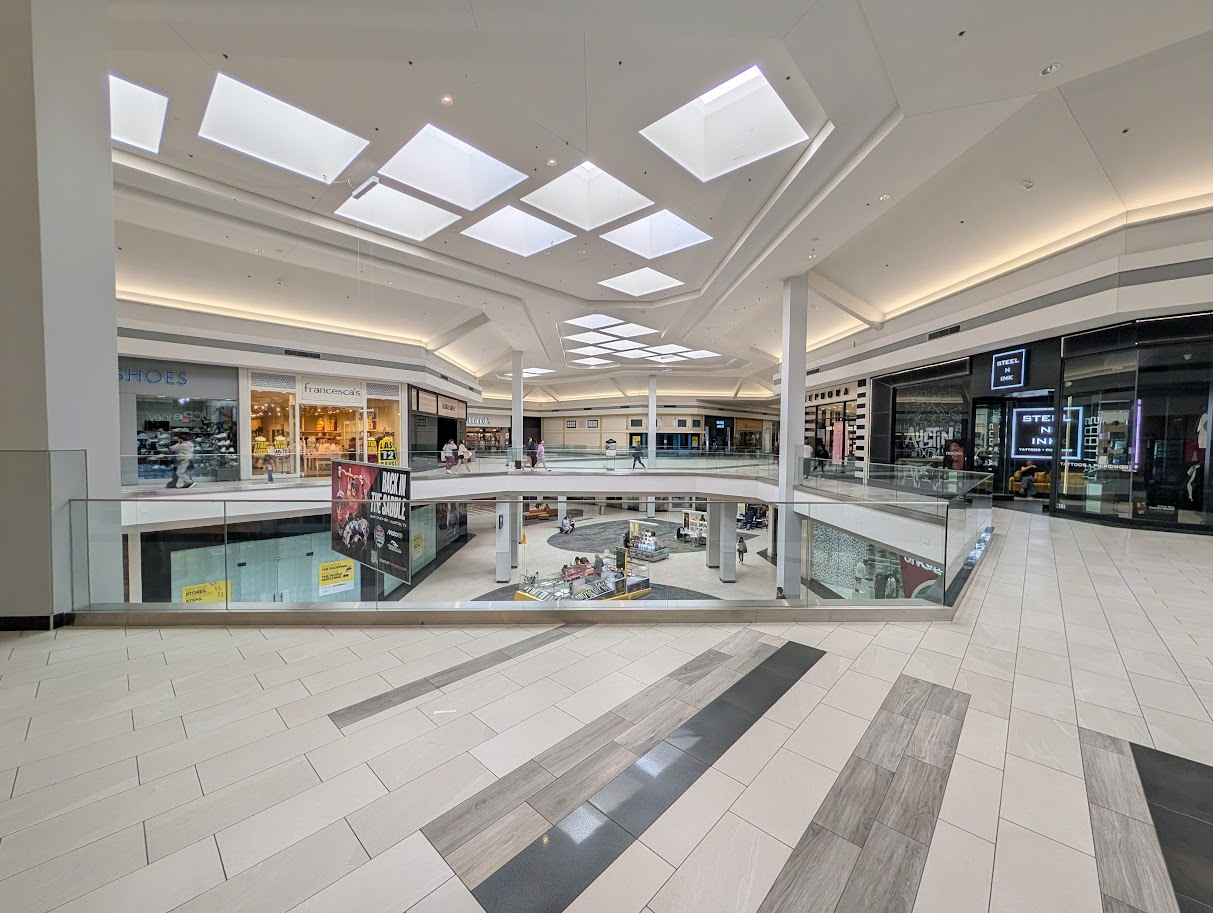
East Court

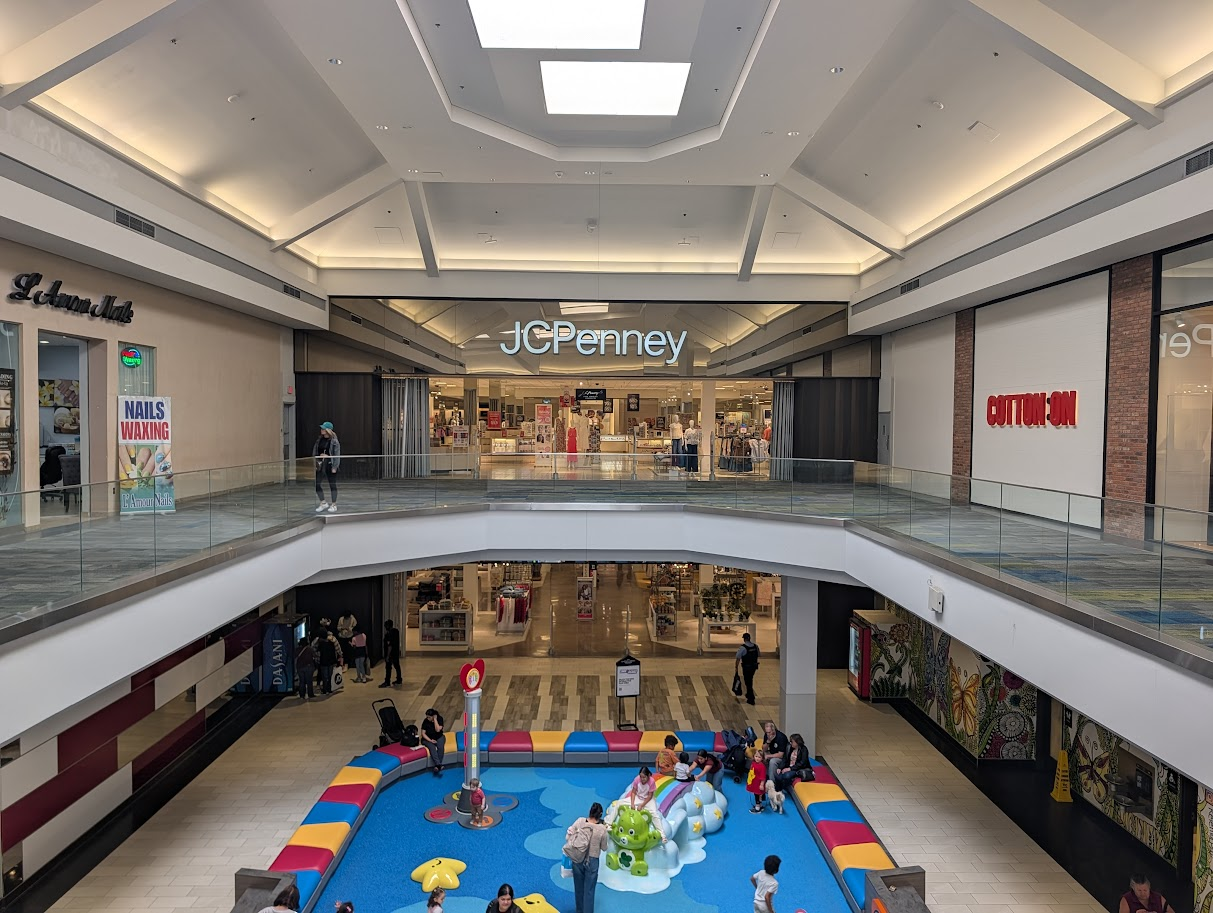
JCPenney North Entrance

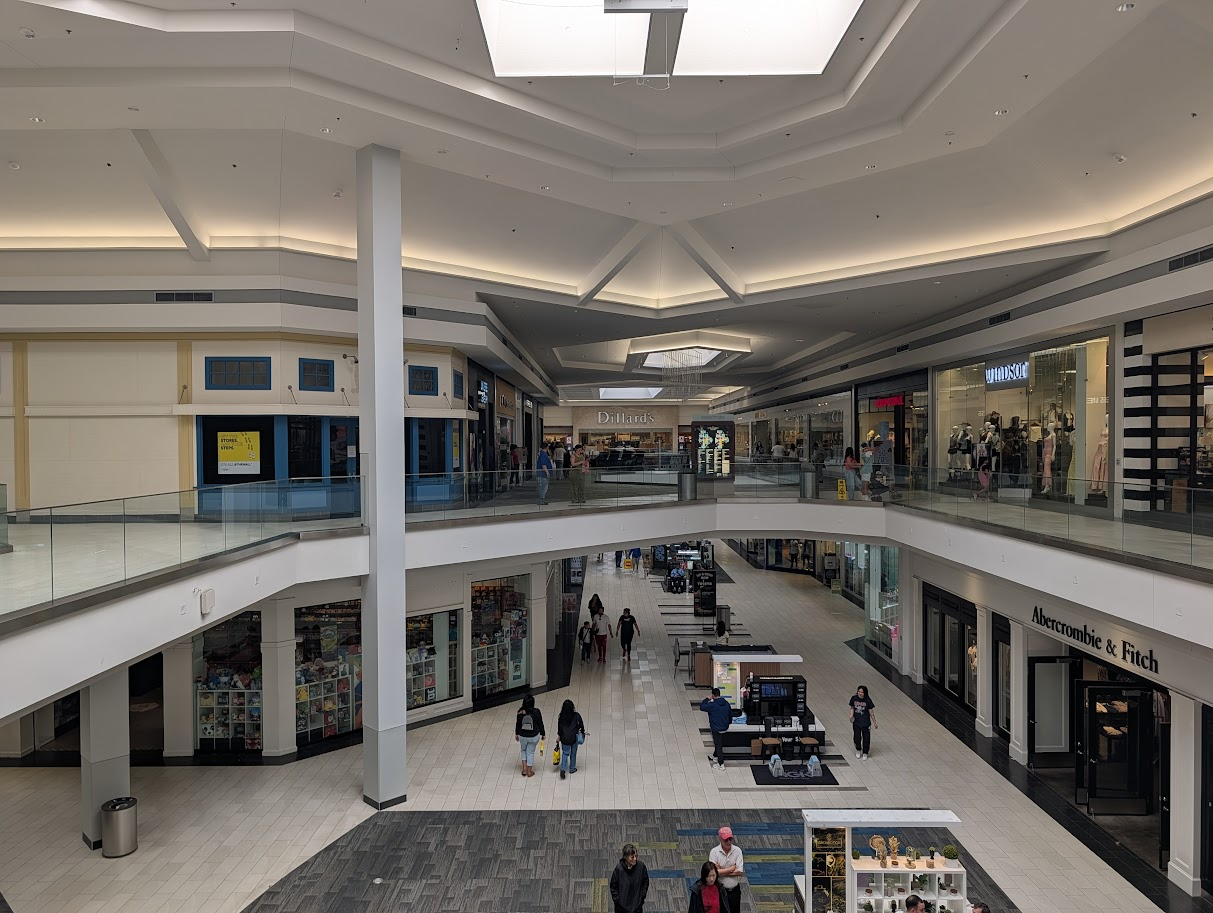
East Wing

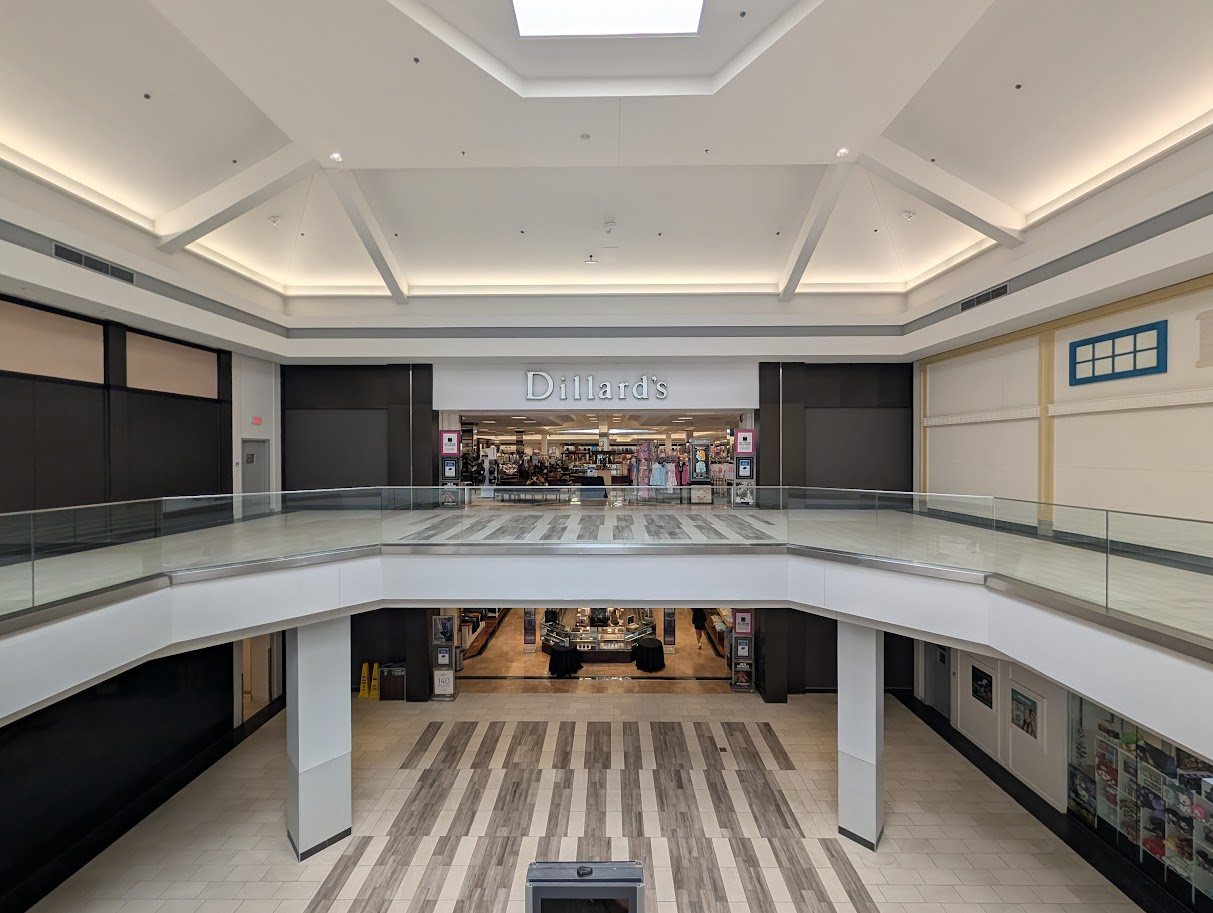
Dillard's Entrance

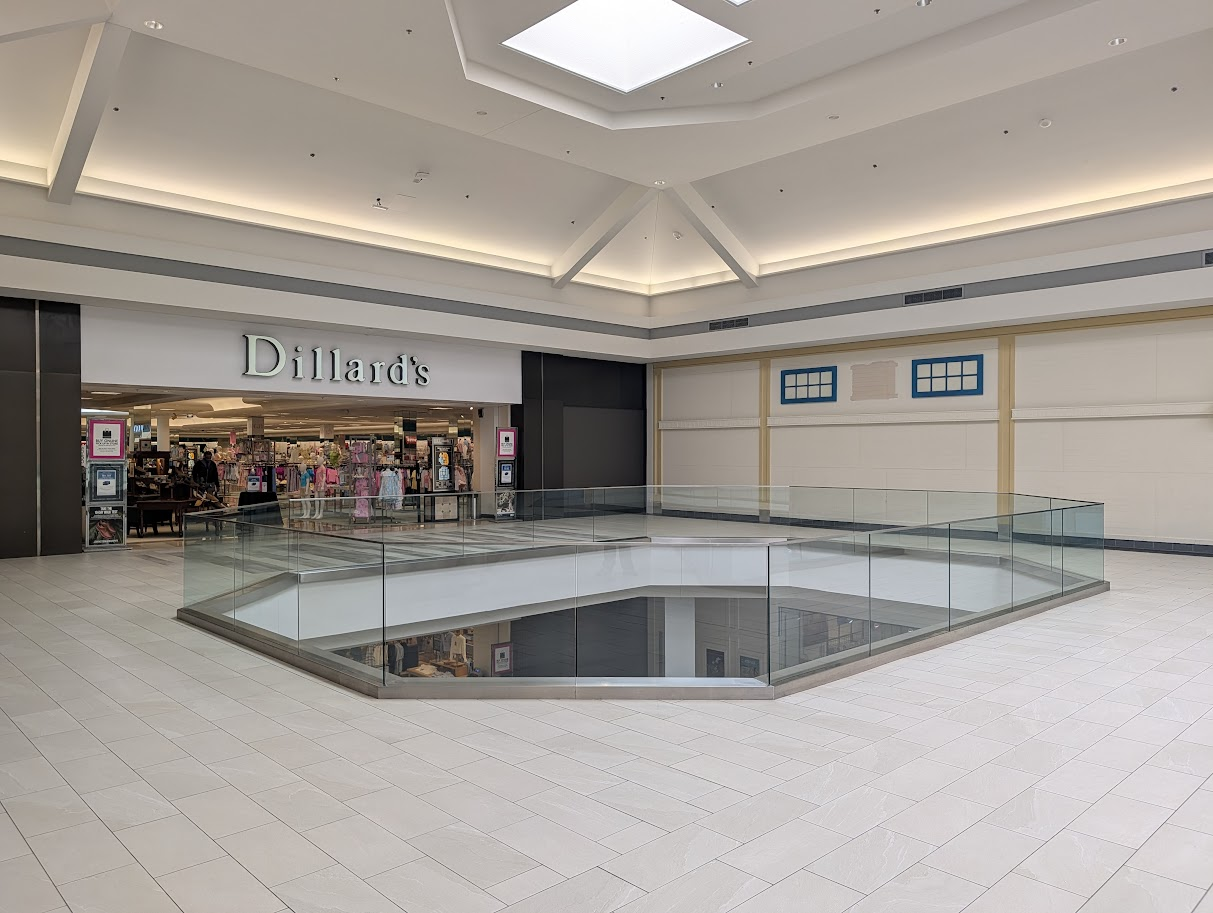
Dillard's Court

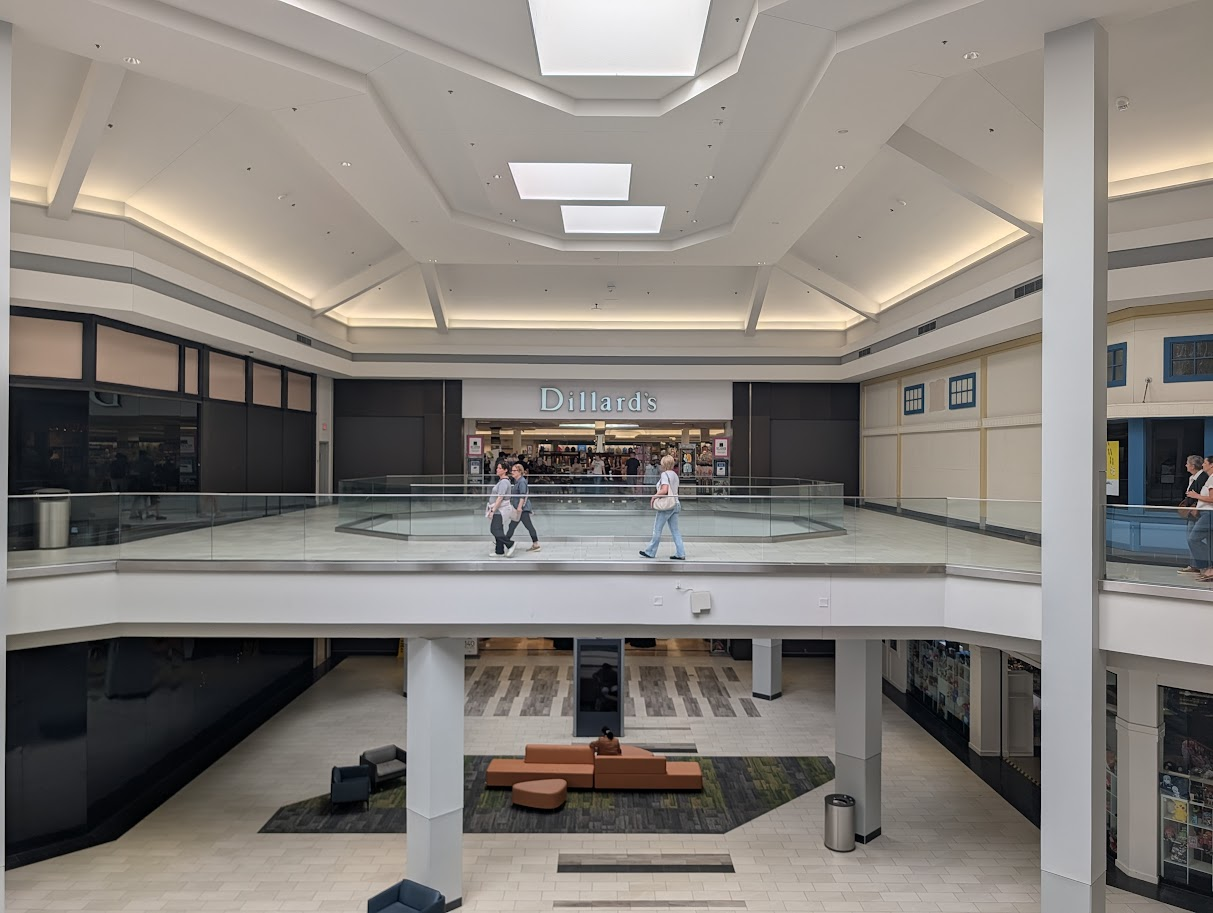
Dillard's Court

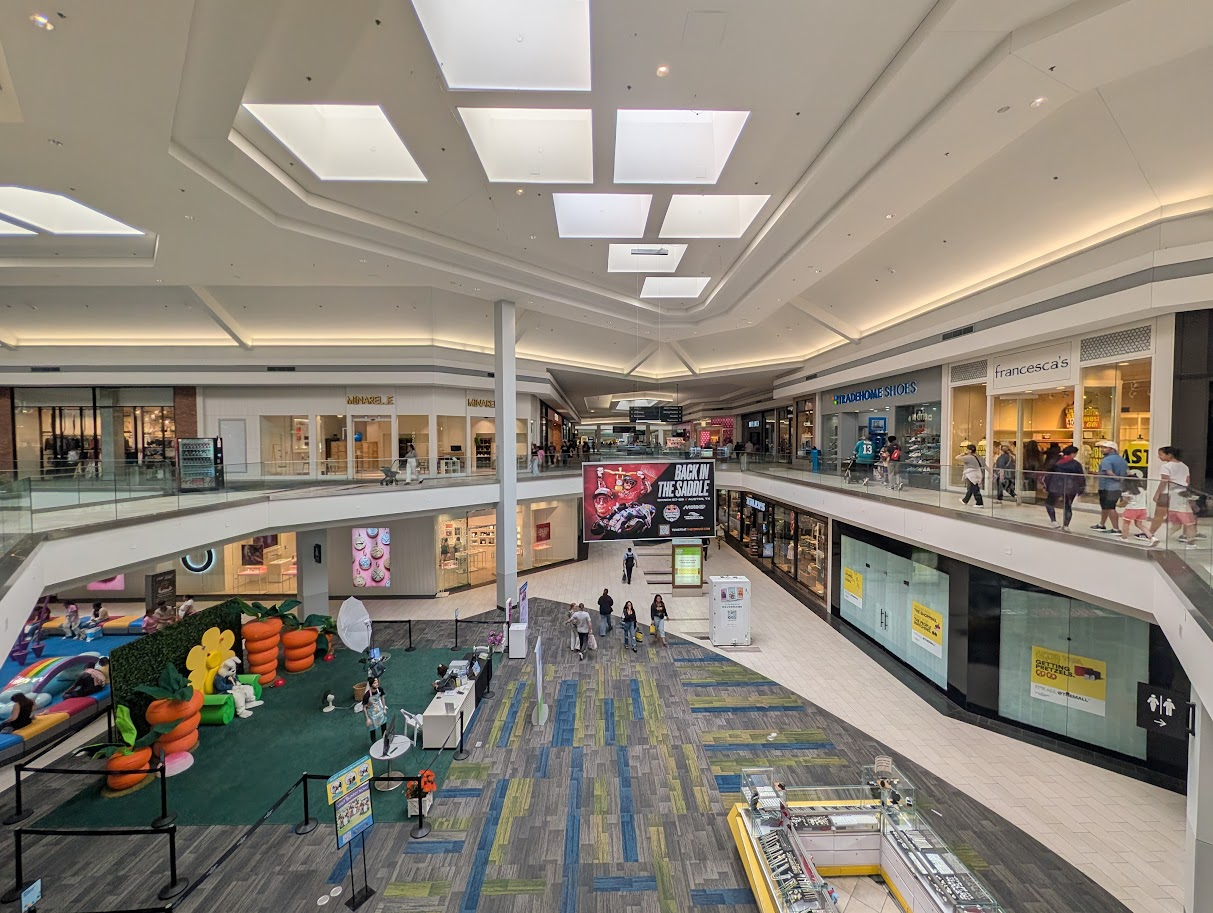
East Court

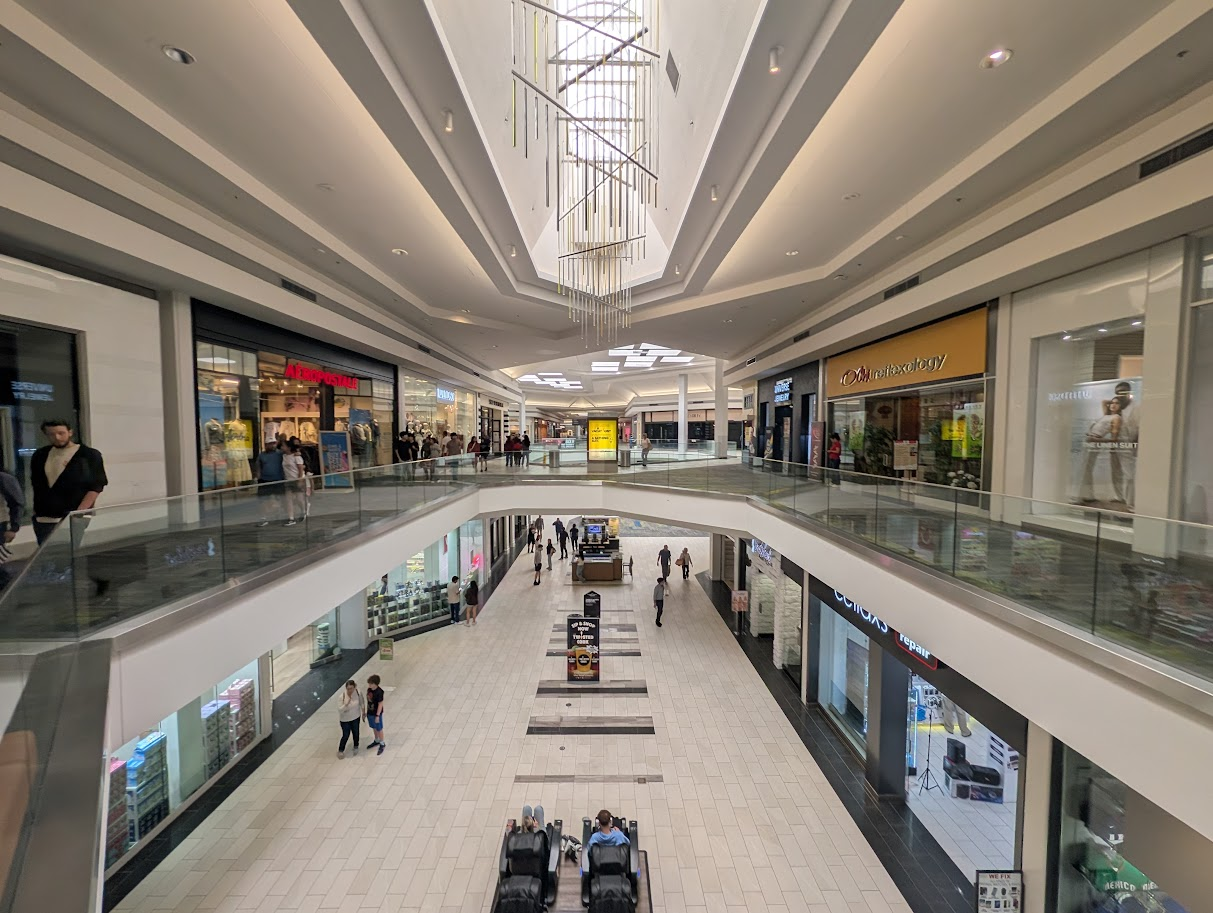
East Wing

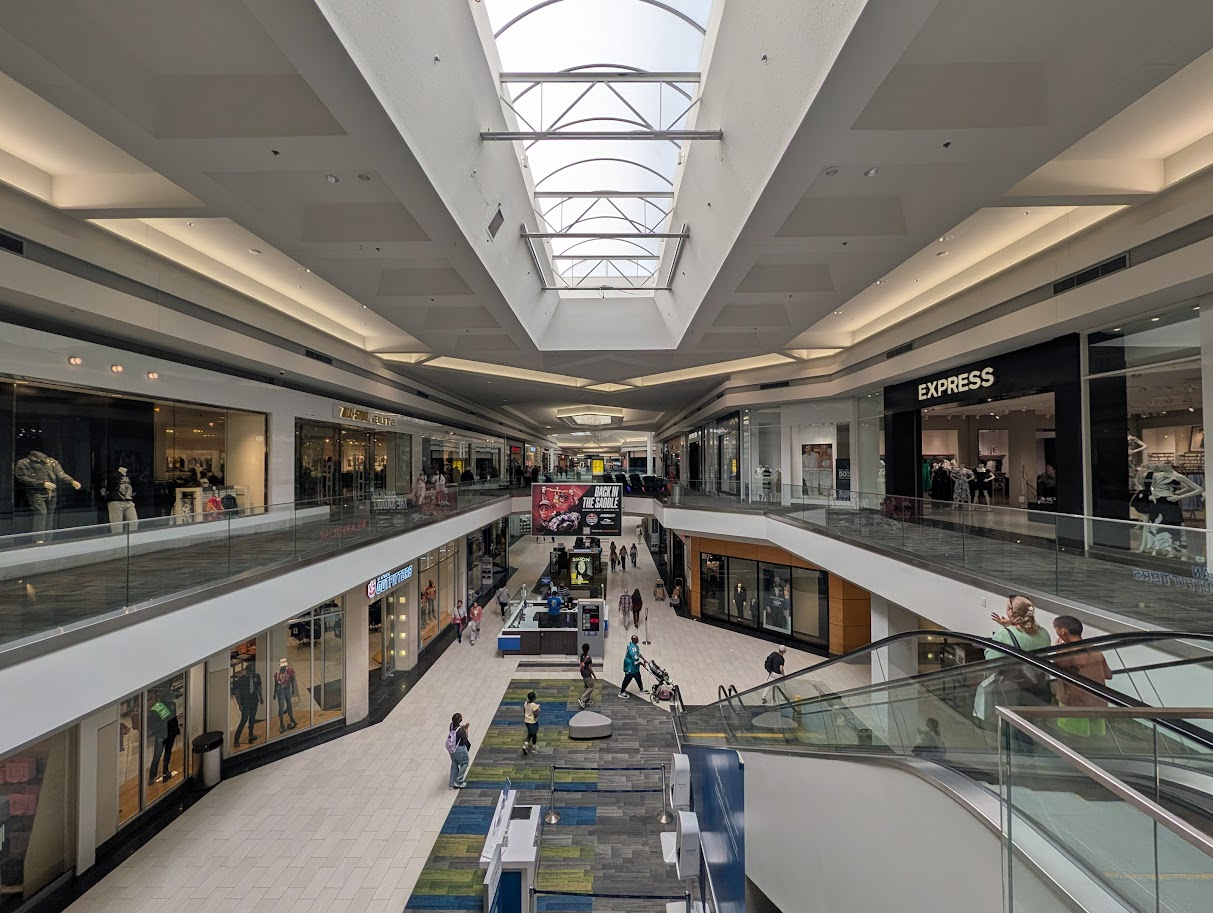
Dillard's Court

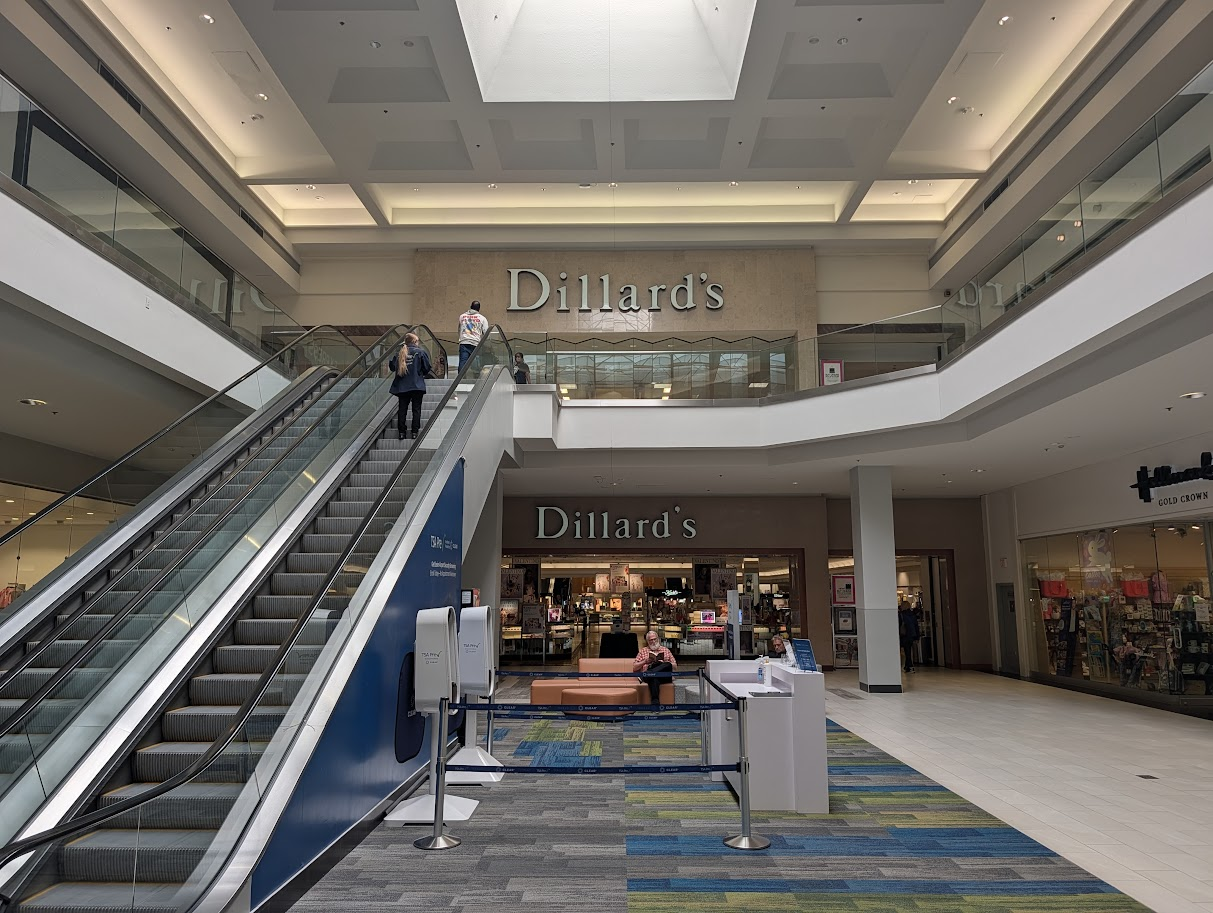
Dillard's Entrance

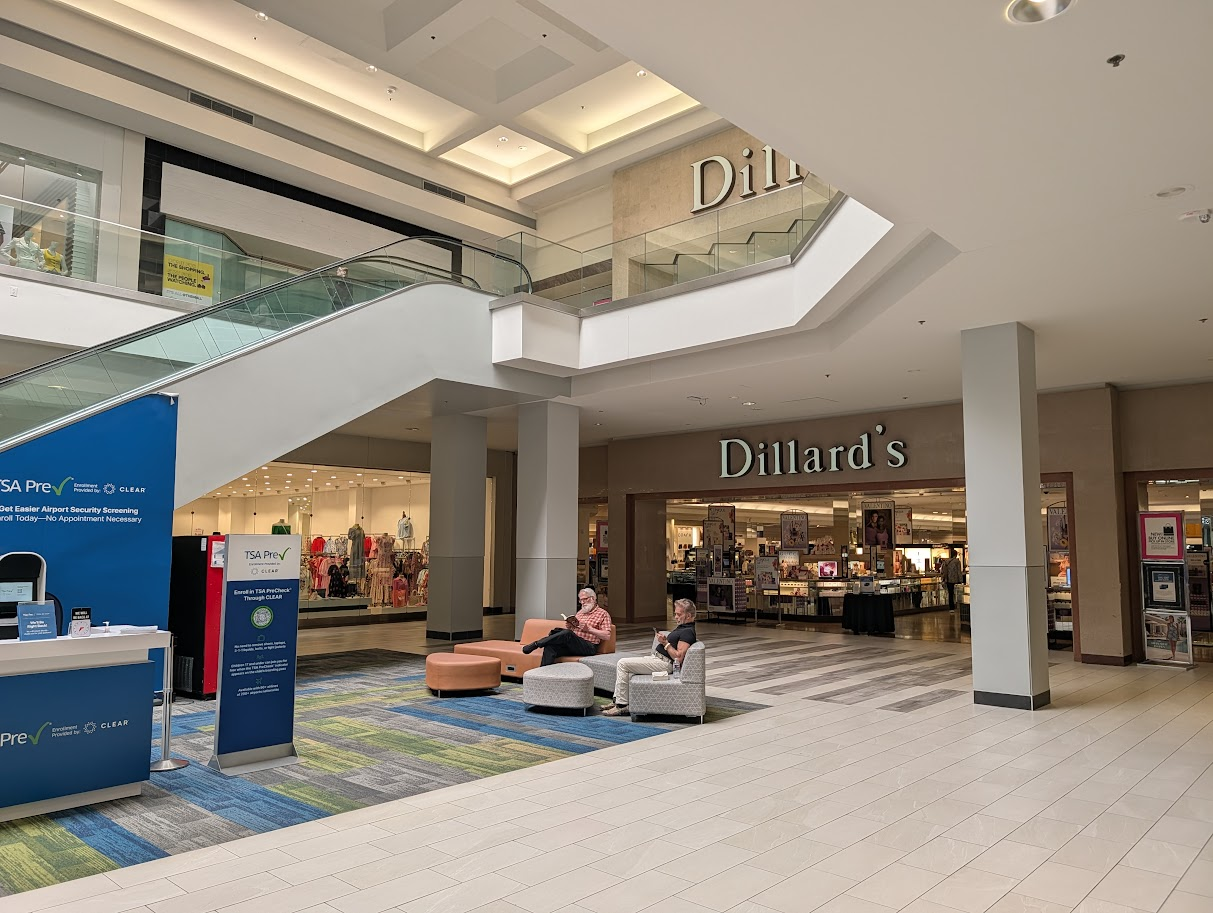
Dillard's Entrance

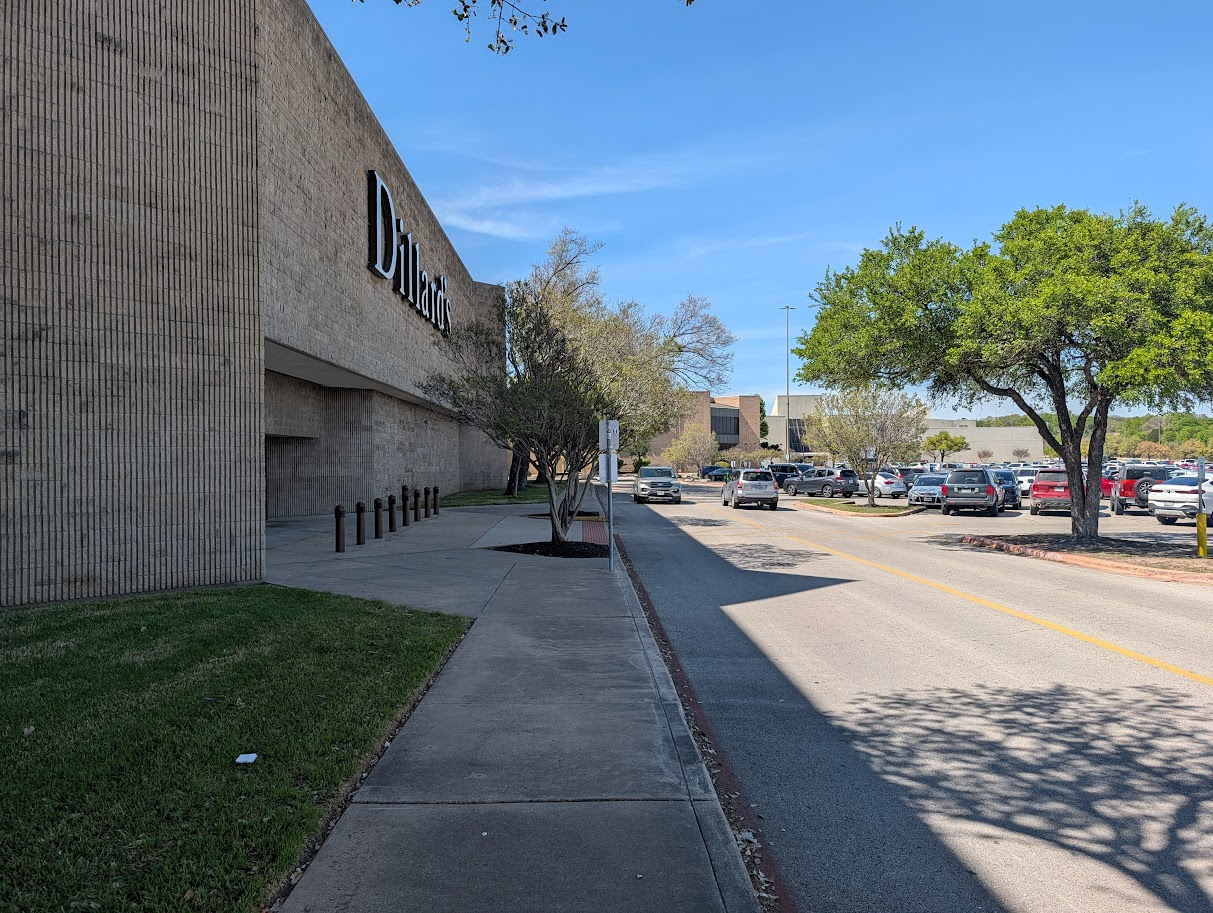
Dillard's Profile
