= Elisabeth Bik =

Dutch microbiologist (born 1966)

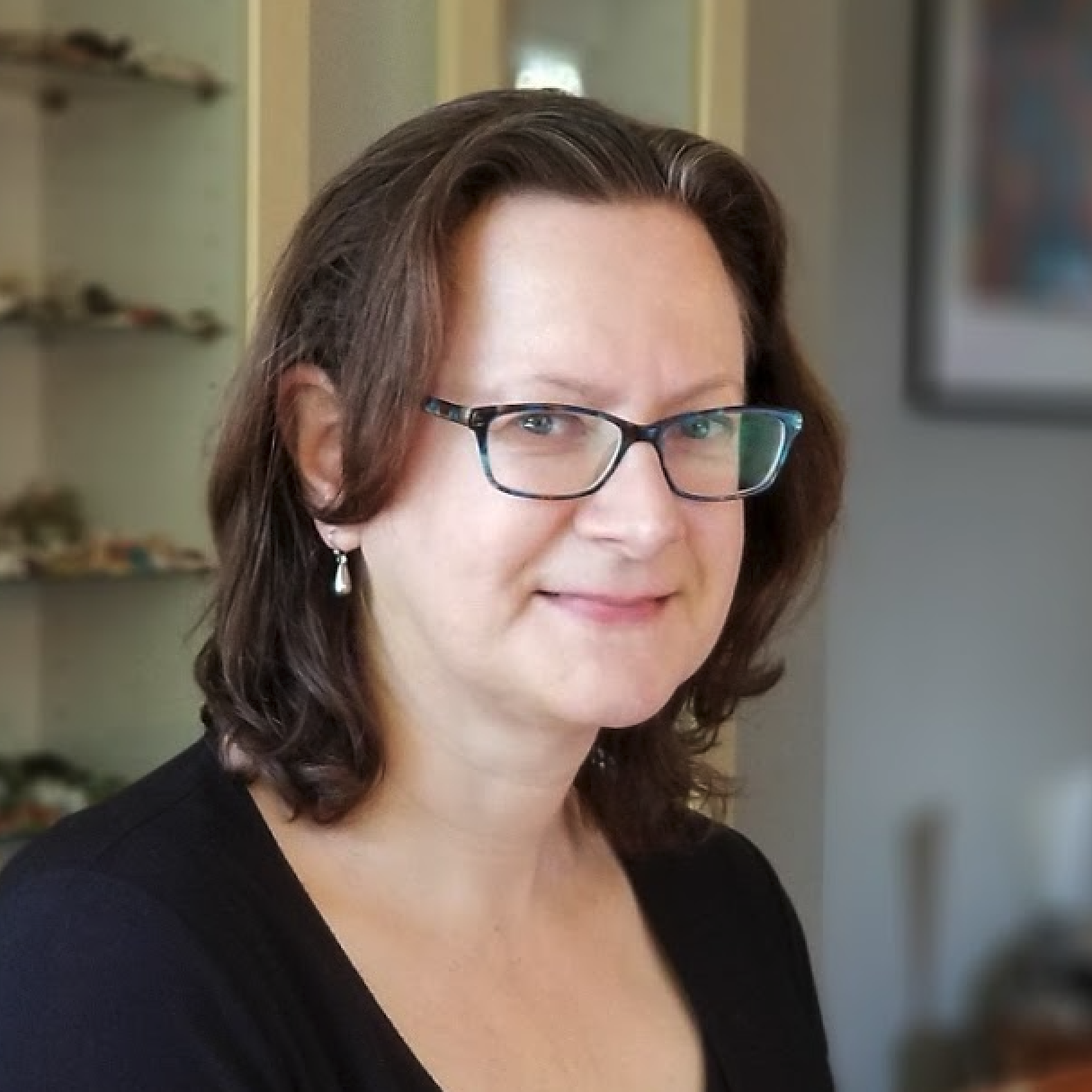
- Bik in 2019
- Born: Elisabeth Margaretha Bik; 1966 (age 59–60); Netherlands
- Education: Utrecht University (MSc, PhD)
- Scientific career
- Workplaces: Stanford University; uBiome
- Thesis: Cholera: vaccine development and evolution of epidemic Vibrio cholerae strains (1996)

Notes
- Elisabeth Bik's voice Recorded June 2019

Elisabeth Margaretha Harbers-Bik (born 1966) is a Dutch microbiologist and scientific integrity consultant. She is known for her work detecting photo manipulation in scientific publications, and identifying over 4,000 potential cases of improper research conduct. She is the founder of Microbiome Digest, a blog with daily updates on microbiome research, and the Science Integrity Digest blog.

Bik was awarded the 2021 John Maddox Prize for "outstanding work exposing widespread threats to research integrity in scientific papers".

== Early life and education ==
Bik was born in the Netherlands. She studied at the Utrecht University, where she obtained her MSc degree and subsequently a PhD in 1996, both in microbiology. Her dissertation was about developing vaccines for new strains of Vibrio cholerae involved in cholera epidemics across India and Bangladesh. She conducted her doctorate and her postdoctoral studies at the molecular microbiology department in the National Institute of Health and the Environment in Bilthoven.

== Career ==
=== Public sector ===
After receiving her doctorate, Bik worked for the Netherlands National Institute for Public Health and the Environment and St. Antonius Hospital in Nieuwegein, where she organized the development of new molecular techniques for identifying infectious agents.

=== Academia ===
In 2001, Bik moved to California to work at Stanford University in the laboratory of David Relman, where her work focused on human microbiomes, previously unidentified microbial species in them, and their diversity across individuals. Her work explored other mucosal microbiomes, confirming that the human oral microbiota contains distinct genera from the gut microbiota.

While at Stanford, Bik worked on an Office of Naval Research project to study the microbiome of dolphins and sea lions in San Diego. She found that their microbiome was distinct from other mammals, and influenced by the sea they lived in.

=== Private sector ===
In 2016, Bik left Stanford to work for uBiome, a biotech company involved in the sequencing of human microbiomes, before leaving the company in 2018 to work full-time on analyzing scientific papers for image duplication and other malpractices.

=== Science integrity ===
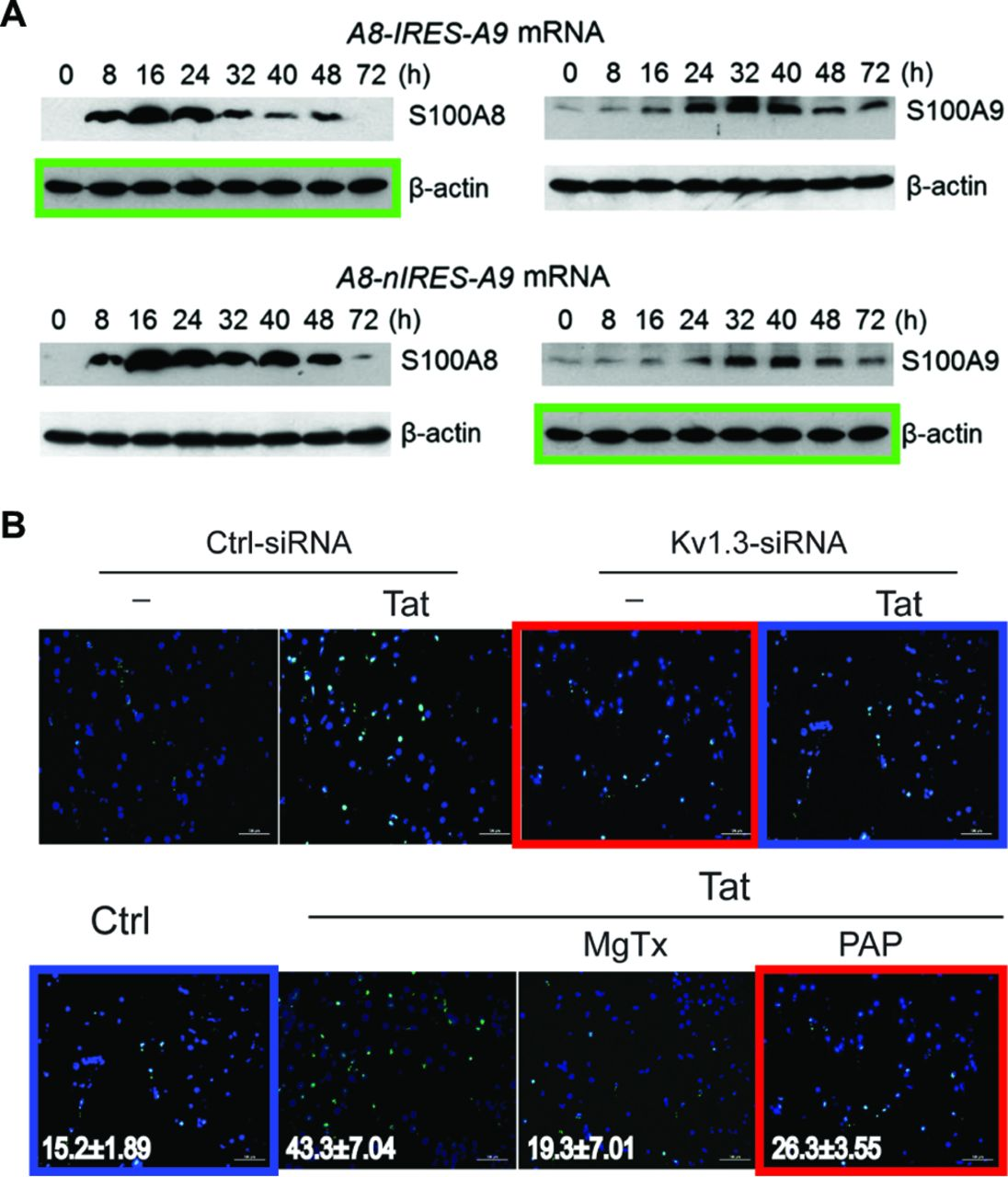
Two examples of image duplications (highlighted) that were discovered by Elisabeth Bik in microbiology research publications. Different panels represent different experimental conditions. The source article states that these might have been "honest errors during assembly of the figures", and that the relevant papers have been corrected.

Bik started to focus on science integrity in 2013, when she discovered that one of her publications had been plagiarised. In January 2014 she found images in papers from Case Western Reserve University School of Medicine that had been duplicated and Photoshopped, leading her to dedicate her free time to look for further manipulation in scientific publications.

In 2014, she started the blog Microbiome Digest, where she provided easy-to-understand commentaries on recent scientific papers. The blog soon became a success, and Bik enlisted help from her colleagues on Twitter to manage the content. She is also an active contributor to Retraction Watch and PubPeer, highlighting scientific papers that present falsified, duplicated, and questionable data, such as in western blot images.

Together with Arturo Casadevall and Ferric Fang, Bik published an mBio paper investigating the prevalence of these questionable practices within published scientific papers, where they found nearly 400 papers with intentional figure manipulation (i.e. about 800 duplicate images). She estimates half of these were created with the intention to mislead. Her investigations have exposed significant levels of scientific misconduct in several journals.

In 2019, Bik announced via Twitter that she was taking a year off paid work to investigate scientific misconduct, the subject on which she co-authored a preregistered test suggesting that "academic culture, peer control, cash-based publication incentives and national misconduct policies", but not pressure to publish, may affect scientific integrity, with nationality being a stronger predictor than individual attributes. Her analysis of 960 recent papers published in Molecular and Cellular Biology found that 59 (6.1%) contained inappropriately duplicated images, from which 5 papers were subsequently retracted and 41 papers had corrections published, and led to a pilot image screening program at the journal identifying problems with 14.5% of subsequent submissions.

In February 2020, Science reported that Bik had identified over 400 research papers published in China over the previous three years, apparently all originating from the same research paper mill company providing full service production of articles describing fake research for medical students on demand. Bik said, "students in China need to have a paper published to get their MD, but they do not have time to do research, so that is an unrealistic goal."

In September 2021, Bik discovered repetitive elements in published images that indicated digital tampering by authors of a paper by the controversial Comet Research Group claiming the discovery of the Biblical Sodom, and evidence that it had been destroyed by a cosmic airburst. The authors initially denied tampering with the photos but eventually published a correction in which they admitted to inappropriate image manipulation. On February 15, 2023, the following editor's note was posted on this paper, "Readers are alerted that concerns raised about the data presented and the conclusions of this article are being considered by the Editors. A further editorial response will follow the resolution of these issues".

During a session of the 2022 European Hematology Association Congress, Bik presented information about artificial intelligence being used to fraudulently generate Western blot images.

==== Hydroxychloroquine ====
In March 2020, commenting on the publication of the results of a clinical trial by Didier Raoult on the effect of hydroxychloroquine against COVID-19, she identified a conflict of interest and strongly criticized the methodology of the study. The owners of the journal that had published the results admitted that the publication was not at the level expected by the society, in particular due to a lack of justification of the criteria for patient selection and triage. They then rebutted allegations of a conflict of interest, stating that the peer review process prior to publication had been respected because Jean-Marc Rolain, one of the co-authors of the article and editor of the journal, had not participated in the evaluation. The publisher Elsevier then announced an additional independent evaluation to determine whether the concerns about the article were well founded.

In May 2021, the French non profit association Citizen4Science, made up of scientists and citizens, published a press release in response to an announcement by Didier Raoult's lawyer that IHU Marseille was suing Bik. Citizen4Science linked a petition denouncing the harassment of scientists and defenders of science integrity, specifically mentioning Bik and calling on French authorities to intervene and journalists to look into the matter. On May 8, 2021, Lonni Besançon, a French postdoctoral research fellow at Monash University, also wrote an open letter signed by scientists to support Bik. The letter, also mentioned in The Guardian, Science, and Nature, gathered signatures from more than 2,200 scientists and 30 scholarly societies. On May 22, 2021, The Guardian reported that Raoult had begun legal proceedings against Elisabeth Bik. A Science article updated on June 4, 2021, in print issue 6546, stated that more than 3,000 signatories supported the Citizen4Science petition.

In December 2024, Raoult's hydroxychloroquine trial article was retracted by its journal due to issues with "adherence to Elsevier's publishing ethics policies and the appropriate conduct of research involving human participants, as well as concerns raised by three of the authors themselves regarding the article's methodology and conclusions." Bik commented that the article shouldn't have been published in the first place or at least should have been withdrawn immediately after publication.

== Awards ==
Bik received the following awards:

- November 2020: the Peter Wildy Prize by the Microbiology Society for communication of microbiology in education and to the public.
- 2021: the John Maddox Prize for "outstanding work exposing widespread threats to research integrity in scientific papers".
- 2021: the Ockham Award for Skeptical Activism by The Skeptic magazine.
- July 2023: the Association for Interdisciplinary Meta-Research and Open Science commendation award.
- 2024: included on the STATUS List by STAT News in recognition of her work as a scientific integrity analyst and her expertise in scientific image analysis.
- November 2024: Einstein Foundation Individual Award for research integrity.
