= Tom Baruch =

American lawyer

Thomas Baruch
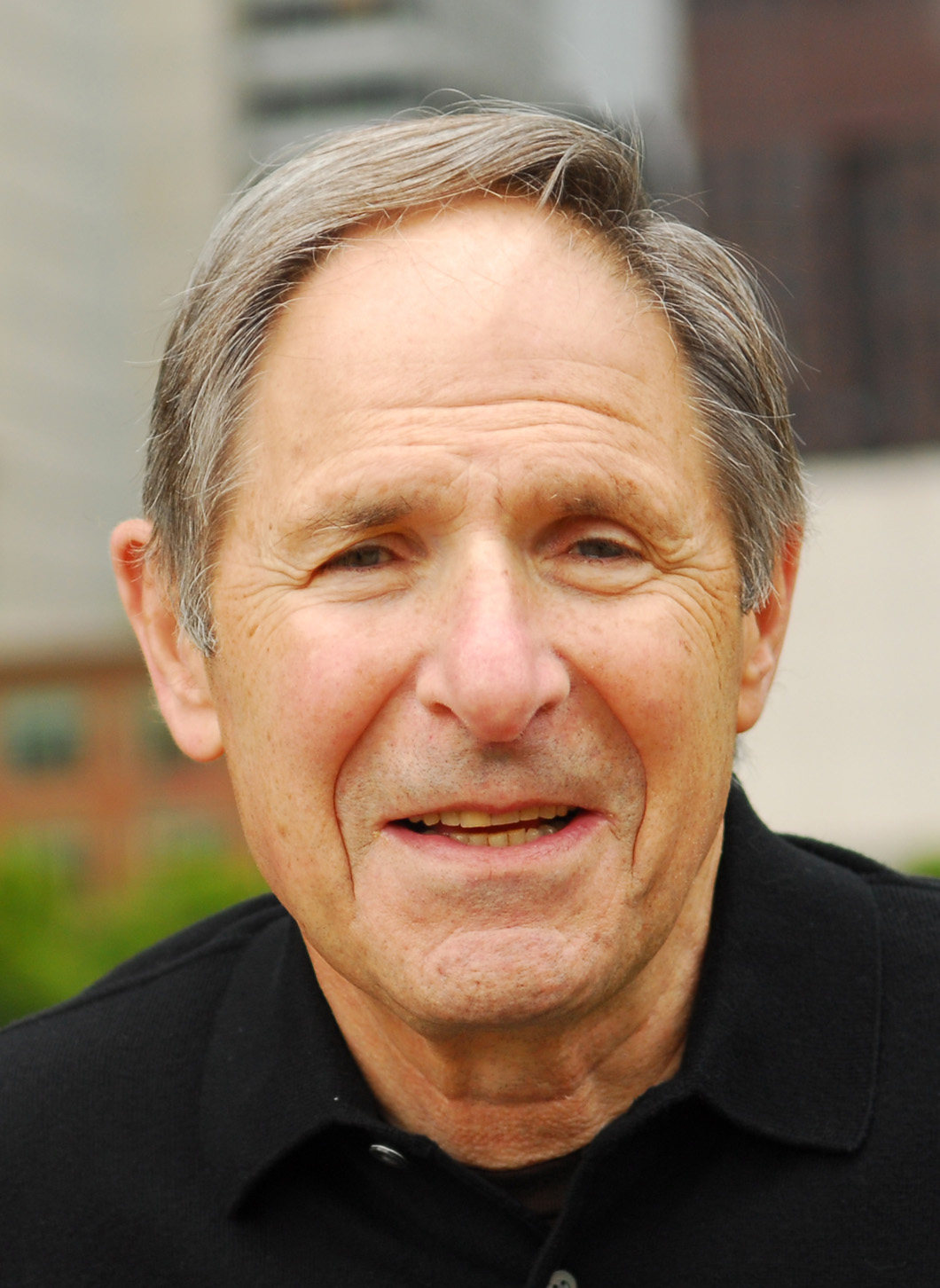
- Born: November 26, 1938 (age 87); New York City, US
- Education: Rensselaer Polytechnic Institute (B.S., 1960); Capital University (J.D., 1967)
- Occupation: Venture Capitalist
- Known for: CMEA Capital, Formation 8, BFV
- Spouse: Johanna Baruch

Tom Baruch (born November 26, 1938) is an American businessman and venture capitalist (VC) based out of San Francisco, California. He was a founding partner of the VC funds CMEA Capital, Formation 8 and is now the managing director of his family office: Baruch Future Ventures (BFV).

== Early life and education ==
Baruch was born to a Jewish family on November 26, 1938, and was raised in Yonkers, New York. He obtained bachelor's degree in engineering from Rensselaer Polytechnic Institute in 1960, where he was awarded the National Science Foundation fellowship. He then earned a Juris Doctor degree from Capital University in 1967, where he became a member of the Order of the Coif. He is a registered patent attorney and member of the State Bar of Ohio.

== Early career ==
Baruch started his career at the Battelle Development Corporation in the 1960s. At Exxon Corporation, where he worked for 12 years in the 1970s and early '80s, he managed investments and created several early-stage technology companies applying materials science and semiconductor-industry technologies. He also invested in a company called Supertex (SUPX), which had an IPO in 1982. When he left in 1982, he was president of the Exxon Materials Division. Baruch then was founder and CEO of Microwave Technology, Inc., a supplier of gallium arsenide (GaAs) integrated circuits for defense applications and value-added sub-systems. Baruch was CEO for six years.

== CMEA Capital ==
Baruch founded CMEA Capital in 1988 in collaboration with New Enterprise Associates (NEA), to focus on venture capital investments in companies applying materials science to innovations that have the ability to transform or create new industries (the acronym CMEA standing for Chemicals and Materials Enterprise Associates). Tom was responsible for managing a total of $1.2 billion of capital across seven funds from inception until July 2010.

While at CMEA, Tom led investments including major IPO's and significant liquidity events for Aclara Biosciences, which merged with Monogram Biosciences (MRGM); Netro (NTRO); Entropic Communications, Inc. (ENTR); Flextronics (FLEX); Symyx Technologies (SMMX); Silicon Spice, acquired by Broadcom (BRCM); Codexis, Inc (CDXS), and Intermolecular (IMI).

Baruch is now a Partner Emeritus of CMEA and maintains involvement in his portfolio companies. Baruch is chairman of Codexis, Inc. and on the board of Intermolecular, Inc (IMI). He was on the board of CNano Technologies, Exela Pharma Sci, Foro Energy, and Wildcat Discovery Technologies.

An area of special interest to Baruch is an innovative process for developing new materials called combinatorial chemistry. It applies a convergence of genomics, Moore’s law hardware and custom software to enable high throughput screening of new materials. Tom has pioneered CMEA’s investments in companies that apply combinatorial synthesis including Codexis, Intermolecular, Symyx Technologies, and Wildcat Discovery.

== Formation 8 ==
Baruch was a founding partner of new VC fund capitalized at $448 million and based on globalization of innovation to Asia. The strategy included strong corporate collaborations leading to an investment focus at the intersection of IT with inefficient markets in energy, banking, finance, education, real estate, insurance and government. He was a director in several portfolio companies including: Algal Scientific (food security); FORO Energy (novel high power lasers and fiber optic waveguides for application to oil and gas discovery and production); Grabit (robotics for industrial logistics and supply chain applications to manufacturing); Heliotrope (dynamic architectural windows for energy efficiency); and Taxon (microbial consortia for agriculture and energy industries, which was sold to DuPont in 2015 at a significant step up in 18 months), and also was a mentor to Formation 8 fund personnel and portfolio company management.

Baruch is partner emeritus and strategy advisor to Formation 8.

== Baruch Future Ventures (BFV) ==
Baruch is the founder and managing director of Baruch Future Ventures (BFV). BFV is a venture capital and family office fund that works with innovators and entrepreneurs to address pain points in resource limited and climate sensitive markets in:

1. clean and efficient energy generation, infrastructure, and storage;
2. water treatment and conservation;
3. air quality;
4. food security and sustainable agriculture and
5. health care diagnostics and therapeutics.

BFV’s investment strategy is based on the hypothesis that population growth up to a peak of 11 to 12 billion people (vs. 7+ billion currently) will place a tremendous burden on resource availability for a growing earth population having increasing amounts of discretionary spending capability. All nations must have access to energy, food, and water free from threat of shortages and with minimal impact on the environment.

== Advisory ==
Baruch is an advisor to 8VC, a San Francisco based leading VC fund founded by Joe Lonsdale, ClearSky Power and Technology Fund (a subsidiary of NextEra Energy), and KCK, a family office from England.

== Public service ==
Baruch is trustee emeritus of the board of trustees of Rensselaer Polytechnic Institute, and he and his wife Johanna established the Center for Biochemical Solar Energy Research. Baruch also is a member of the executive committee of the Council on Competitiveness and a member of the Steering Committee of its ESIS (Energy, Security, Innovation and Sustainability) Initiative and the U.S. Manufacturing Competitiveness Initiative. He was a founding member of the National Advisory Council on Innovation and Entrepreneurship (NACIE), where he advised the U.S. Department of Commerce and the White House. Baruch is on the board of the Sierra Club Climate Recovery Partnership, as a member of the "Brain Trust" of the ARPA-E program within the U.S. Department of Energy. He was part of the IPO Task Force advising the U.S. Department of the Treasury in connection with necessity of programs to stimulate start-up activity in the US. Baruch is a member of the board of directors to the Society Kauffman Fellows and a trustee of the 'That Man May See' program within the University of California, San Francisco. Baruch is also an advisor to Humanity United, a social investment organization committed to bringing an end to slavery and mass atrocities.
