= Joe Lonsdale =

American entrepreneur and venture capitalist

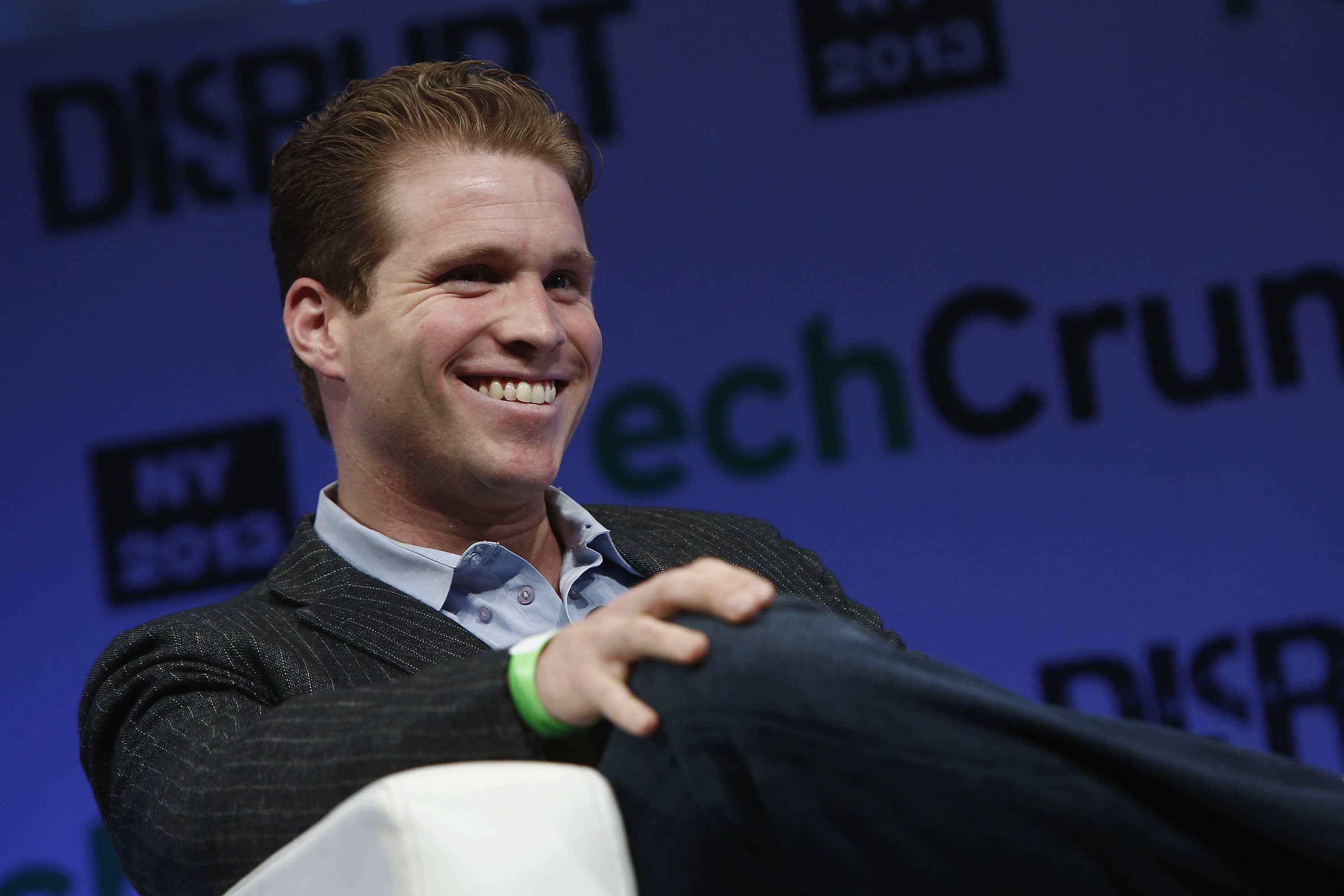
- Lonsdale in 2013
- Born: 1982/1983 (age 43–44)
- Education: Stanford University (BS)
- Occupation: Venture capitalist; Entrepreneur
- Known for: Palantir Technologies; Addepar; OpenGov; 8VC; Formation 8

Joseph Lonsdale (born 1982 or 1983) is an American entrepreneur and venture capitalist. He co-founded Palantir, Addepar, and OpenGov, and co-founded and works as the managing partner at the technology investment firm 8VC.

Lonsdale began his career as an intern at PayPal, then worked as an early executive at Clarium Capital, a hedge fund run by Lonsdale's mentor, Peter Thiel. In 2004, he, Thiel, and three others co-founded Palantir. Lonsdale left Palantir in 2009.

In 2009, he co-founded Addepar, a wealth management technology company. In 2011, Lonsdale co-founded the venture capital firm Formation 8, and in 2015, he founded the technology investment firm 8VC.

Lonsdale has been outspoken about politics, and is an active Republican donor and fundraiser. He founded the conservative Cicero Institute think tank and co-founded the private University of Austin.

== Early life and education ==
Lonsdale grew up in Fremont, California, with two brothers. His father was Irish Converted Jewish and he was raised Jewish by his mother. He has described his family as "very, very competitive".

Lonsdale graduated from Stanford University in 2004 with a degree in computer science. From 2002 to 2003, he served as editor-in-chief of The Stanford Review, a student-run newspaper with a predominantly libertarian and conservative editorial perspective. The Stanford Review was co-founded in 1987 by Peter Thiel, who would eventually become a mentor to Lonsdale.

== Career ==
=== Early career ===
Lonsdale interned at the financial technology firm PayPal while at Stanford. Although he was never a founder or executive at the company, he is sometimes described as a part of the "PayPal Mafia" due to his close connections with members of that group, which includes Thiel, Max Levchin, Reid Hoffman, and David O. Sacks. Although Lonsdale did not know Peter Thiel well during his time at PayPal, his internship led to a position as an early executive at Thiel's hedge fund, Clarium Capital.

=== Entrepreneurship ===
In 2004, Lonsdale began working on a prototype for the data mining and defense technology company Palantir Technologies, which he cofounded along with Thiel, Alex Karp, Stephen Cohen, and Nathan Gettings. The company aimed to apply the types of big data and data analytics techniques used for fraud detection at PayPal to national security, military, and law enforcement problems. Palantir received early investment from the CIA via its In-Q-Tel venture fund, and many of its first customers were intelligence agencies. Since then, Palantir has sold access to its large shared databases and to its analysis and prediction software to government agencies, militaries, police departments, financial firms, healthcare and pharmaceutical companies, and others.

Lonsdale made much of his fortune at Palantir, which was valued at $1 billion by 2010. Lonsdale left Palantir in 2009, though he continued to hold an advisory role and a stake in the company.

Lonsdale co-founded Addepar, a wealth management and data analytics platform, in 2009 with Jason Mirra. The software is targeted towards financial advisers and the ultra-wealthy, and is intended to provide a clear view into complex financial portfolios, predict future risks, and help with reporting and transfers. Early investors in the company included Thiel and PayPal veteran David O. Sacks. In 2013, Lonsdale became chairman and left his role as CEO.

Lonsdale and Zachary Bookman co-founded OpenGov, a company which offers cloud-based software for government budgeting, in 2012. He was chairman of the board until 2024, when the company was acquired by Cox Enterprises. He also co-founded and serves on the boards of Affinity, Anduin, Epirus, Esper, Hearth, LIT, Resilience Bio, and Swiftscale Bio.

=== Investment ===
In 2011, Lonsdale, Brian Koo, and Jim Kim co-founded the San Francisco-based venture capital firm Formation 8, which focused on investing in technology companies based in Asia. Its first fund raised almost $450 million, and the firm was described by Fortune as "the hottest new VC firm since Andreessen Horowitz". The company went on to raise a second, $500 million fund in December 2014. Formation 8's portfolio included Color Genomics, Oculus VR, Oscar Health, Plated, RelateIQ, Wish, and Yello Mobile.

Formation 8 shut down in November 2015, citing differences in investment strategies among its founders. Subsequent reports linked the closure to personal conflicts between Joe Lonsdale and Brian Koo, including tensions related to a public sexual assault allegation and lawsuit involving Lonsdale, as well as a failed investment by Koo. Koo was reportedly upset that Lonsdale had not informed him of the allegation before the lawsuit became public, and was concerned about the potential impact on his family's reputation; Koo's family is affiliated with the LG and LS chaebols in South Korea. These concerns were reportedly shared by Koo's father, John Koo, who chaired Formation 8's strategic advisory board and had pledged $50 million in early investment to the firm. Lonsdale, in turn, had raised concerns about Koo's investments in Asia, including an unsuccessful effort to establish a Korean branch of Wish, which was later viewed by Wish's CEO as a competing venture.

==== 8VC ====
In 2015, shortly after the breakup of Formation 8, Lonsdale co-founded 8VC (originally called "8 Partners") with 15 of the 25 employees from Formation 8. 8VC has invested in Anduril, Hyperloop One, Synthego, and UBiome. Originally based in San Francisco, Lonsdale relocated the firm's headquarters to Austin, Texas in 2020, shortly after moving there with his family. The fund employs Jack Moshkovich, the son of Vadim Moshkovich, and Denis Aven, the son of Petr Aven. Lonsdale posted about these employees on X, saying, "I'm lucky to live in the greatest country in the world, and it will remain as such if we can keep working with the top talent of all backgrounds, including, yes, Chinese and Russians and Israelis et al, without demonizing people for imagined things they didn't do. We haven't taken any money from their fathers or their fathers' friends, and don't need it."

Lonsdale has also been an angel investor. He was included in Forbes' "30 Under 30" list in 2012, "Richest Entrepreneurs Under 40" in 2016, and "Midas List" in 2021 (later dropping off the list in 2022).

== Political views ==
Lonsdale is an active Republican political donor and fundraiser, and has been involved with the Koch network. He is a member of the board of trustees of the Ronald Reagan Presidential Foundation & Institute. In 2024, Lonsdale joined Douglas Leone, David O. Sacks, and other venture capitalists and tech executives in supporting Elon Musk's America PAC, a super PAC backing Donald Trump's 2024 presidential campaign. Lonsdale has been described as a friend and "political confidant" of Musk's. According to The New York Times, Lonsdale is among the leaders of the super PAC, and was a major fundraiser for the committee in addition to making his own $1 million contribution.. He also appears in the directory of Peter Thiel's Dialog organization.

In 2016, Lonsdale founded the Cicero Institute conservative think tank, and runs it along with his wife, Tayler. The group has pushed for criminalizing homelessness and rejecting Housing First policies. The group publishes a template for state legislation that includes fines of up to $5,000 for repeatedly violating encampment bans and language to facilitate involuntary psychiatric commitments. As of August 2024, bills based on the template have been introduced in fifteen states and passed in eight. According to Rolling Stone, the Cicero Institute "helped transform homelessness policing from a niche fixation of a segment of Silicon Valley into a rallying cry in the culture war".

In 2017, Business Insider described Lonsdale as "lean[ing] right" and a "politically conservative contrarian". In his college-years at Stanford, he joined other right- and libertarian-leaning students at the Stanford Review. Speaking later about this decision, he said: "It's not as much about the politics as it was about being contrarian. Hopefully, I'm slightly more mature now, but I've always relished standing out from the crowd, standing up and disagreeing with everyone. If I had grown up in Arkansas, I would have joined up with the left-wing club."

In November 2020, Lonsdale announced that he was moving his family, 8VC, and the Cicero Institute from the Bay Area to Austin, Texas. In an opinion editorial published in The Wall Street Journal, he cited California's "bad policies [that] discourage business and innovation", worsening public safety, high taxes, and a deteriorating quality of life as the primary factors in his decision. In the editorial and subsequent interviews, Lonsdale argued that the "intolerant far left" that ran California's government and were the loudest voices in Silicon Valley companies were the root cause of these problems.

In 2021, The Guardian described Lonsdale as "a regular critic of 'woke' politics". He criticized men for taking paternity leave.

In 2023, Lonsdale, writer Bari Weiss, and others co-founded the University of Austin. Lonsdale and his collaborators described the school as dedicated to freedom of thought and discussion, and criticized academia for treating faculty "like thought criminals" and suppressing open inquiry among students. When asked why he created the university, Lonsdale expressed his view that Ivy League universities and Stanford had been "conquered" by "radical, far-left ideologues", and that people could no longer become professors or Ph.D. students at such institutions unless they acquiesced to the "woke mind virus". The University of Austin promised "Forbidden Courses" involving topics including science, religion, race, gender politics, and conservatism, with lecturers including prominent tech founders and venture capitalists like Marc Andreessen, Antonio García Martínez, and others. The school raised $150 million, much of it from venture capitalists and those in the tech industry.

Early in 2025, Lonsdale announced he was working to embed a team of engineers inside the Food and Drug Administration to "accelerate the FDA's latest AI initiatives," a claim the Department of Health and Human Services later said was "not true."

In April 2025, Lonsdale convened a closed-door meeting of University of Austin faculty and staff in which, according to Politico, he articulated a sharply partisan vision for the institution, asserting that staff and faculty should adhere to a set of ideological principles and warned that those uncomfortable with his views should consider leaving. Faculty accounts characterized his remarks as a significant departure from the university's public branding as a politically open, free speech-oriented institution. Critics accused Lonsdale and the University of ideological double standards, for engaging in the same "cancel culture" the institution was established to fight.

During the 2026 U.S. immigration enforcement protests, in Minneapolis, Lonsdale decried the protesters as being an "organized illegal insurgency" and compared it to being a rebellion. Lonsdale has advocated for publicly hanging criminals to demonstrate "masculine leadership". He has also promoted the opinions and lectures of Peter Thiel about the Antichrist.

In 2026, following the capture of Venezuelan president Nicolás Maduro, Lonsdale reposted another person's tweet that "Commies... should be blown up", writing, "Exactly. What did you think founding Palantir was supposed to be about?" His comments have led to public criticism for endorsing extreme political rhetoric and promoting fringe ideological views.

== Personal life ==
In March 2012, Lonsdale began dating Elise "Ellie" Clougherty while he was her assigned mentor at Stanford University. In May 2013, after they broke up, Clougherty reported to Stanford University that Lonsdale had sexually assaulted her while she was an undergraduate. In June 2013, Stanford found that he had engaged in sexual misconduct, and banned him from campus for ten years.

In January 2015, Clougherty sued Lonsdale over the alleged sexual assault. Lonsdale countersued Clougherty for defamation. In November 2015, Clougherty dropped her lawsuit, and Lonsdale dropped his countersuit. Stanford lifted its campus ban, with a spokesperson stating that "new evidence that came to light during litigation" had caused them to decide he had not violated campus policy.

In September 2016, Lonsdale married Tayler Cox. Tayler, like Lonsdale, edited the Stanford Review while attending Stanford, and later worked at Palantir. They have four daughters and a son together. They moved from the Bay Area in California to Austin, Texas, in 2020.

In 2025, Lonsdale was reported to have laid tefillin with Chabad activist Yossi Farro.
