= The Free Press (CBS News) =

American Internet-based media company

- Formerly: Common Sense (2021–2022)
- Type: News media
- Founded: January 2021; 5 years ago
- Founders: Bari Weiss; Nellie Bowles
- Headquarters: New York City, U.S.
- Owner: Skydance
- Parent: CBS News
- Website: thefp.com

The Free Press (The FP), formerly Common Sense, is an American media company based in New York City. Founded by opinion writer Bari Weiss and her spouse Nellie Bowles, it began as a newsletter in 2021 and grew into an associated media company in 2022. Since October 2025, it is an independent entity within CBS News, whose parent company Paramount Skydance (now Skydance) acquired it in 2025 for $150 million.

== History ==
Bari Weiss, a former The New York Times opinion columnist, and her spouse, the journalist Nellie Bowles, launched Common Sense as a newsletter on the Substack platform in January 2021. The publication was named after the political pamphlet by Thomas Paine and covered politics, culture, and current events. Weiss described Common Sense as a "newsletter for the 21st century".

By August 2021, the newsletter had 14,000 subscribers, yearly revenue of $800,000, and three staff members. In March 2022, Weiss raised between $1 million and $5 million from investors such as venture capitalists Marc Andreessen and David Sacks; former Starbucks CEO Howard Schultz; Allen & Company; and former Activision CEO Bobby Kotick. In 2025, Weiss said the company was valued at over $200 million.

=== Rebranding as The Free Press ===
Weiss rebranded Common Sense as The Free Press in 2022, while maintaining its mainly opinion/editorial (op/ed) journalism genre. Coinciding with the rebranding, The Free Press expanded into a media company with a dozen staff and writers as well as contributors and a subscription-based business model. Andy Mills, former producer of The Daily, was hired to develop audio programming for the company. By October 2023, the company employed about 25 staffers in New York City and Los Angeles.

In December 2024, Wall Street Journal editor Dennis K. Berman was hired as the company's first publisher and president. In April 2025, The Free Press added author and economist Tyler Cowen, legal scholar Jed Rubenfeld, writer Coleman Hughes, journalist Matthew Continetti, and author Batya Ungar-Sargon as regular columnists. In 2025, Semafor reported that journalist Michael C. Moynihan resigned from The Free Press. He was critical of the direction of the publication, saying, "[One] didn't have to be especially prescient to spot those 'anti-woke' types who would just slowly become MAGA flunkies".

=== Purchase by Paramount ===
On October 6, 2025, Weiss was named to the newly created position of editor-in-chief of CBS News and that Paramount Skydance (now Skydance), CBS News' owner, would acquire The Free Press for roughly $150 million in cash. The Free Press now operates under the CBS News banner.

== Overview ==
=== Staff and contributors ===
Journalists and writers who have written for The Free Press include Emily Yoffe, Michael Shellenberger, and Joe Nocera. Other contributors include Douglas Murray and Vinay Prasad.

=== Subscribers ===
As of August 2024, the site had over 100,000 paid subscribers and over 750,000 total subscribers. Substack confirmed that it was the top newsletter on the platform by revenue. It is also at the top of the leaderboard at Substack for politics. As of December 2024, The Free Press had over 136,000 paid subscribers and was taking in at least $10 million annually. By the time of the Paramount acquisition in October 2025, the outlet had grown to more than 170,000 paid subscribers and an additional 1.3 million free newsletter subscribers. Press Gazette estimated more than $18 million in annual subscriber-based revenue, in addition to fundraising, advertising, and other channels.

=== Events ===
The Free Press expanded into organizing and hosting events in 2023, holding its first one in September 2023—a debate over the sexual revolution featuring Grimes, Louise Perry, Anna Khachiyan, and Sarah Haider. The sold-out event at the Ace Hotel in Los Angeles was attended by 1,600 people. During 2024, The Free Press held live debate events in San Francisco, Dallas, Washington, D.C. and New York City.

=== Podcasts ===
In June 2021, as part of Common Sense, Weiss launched the Honestly podcast, which has since featured guests including Kim Kardashian, Bill Barr, and Andrew Yang. In early 2023, Megan Phelps-Roper hosted a podcast series at The Free Press, titled The Witch Trials of J. K. Rowling, featuring interviews with Rowling and other persons from all sides of the cultural conflicts surrounding the author and her views on transgender people. The podcast series attracted over five million listeners.

=== Editorial stance ===
Media critics have described the outlet as occupying a space between mainstream and conservative media, often associated with the "anti-woke" or centrist movements. The New York Times described The Free Press as "an unflinching alternative to traditional media organizations" and that it "frequently lambastes the perceived excesses of the so-called woke left." Politico characterizes it as a "conservative digital media outlet." CNN describes it as a "conservative-leaning publication" that "has won fans, and created plenty of fodder for critics, with heterodox columns and features." It further said that "its volume of so-called anti-woke content has stood out" along with "opinion pieces conveying strong support for Israel." The Washington Post describes it as "an outlet for contrarian, sometimes controversial and often right-leaning commentary." NPR describes it as a "provocative news site known for criticizing mainstream media and left-leaning 'woke' culture". The Guardian described The Free Press as having an "anti-woke, anti-cancel culture focus."

After its acquisition by Paramount, John Oliver said on his show Last Week Tonight that one of the main positions of The Free Press is that "the left has gone too far". Writing for the liberal website The UnPopulist, Matt Johnson wrote that "one reason for The Free Press's popularity is that it offers intellectual reassurances to legions of anti-anti-Trump readers – sophisticated conservatives who may be uneasy about Trumpism, yet want to believe that wokeness and other left-wing excesses are the primary threats to western civilization."

== Reporting ==
The founding of the University of Austin was first announced in Common Sense in the year of 2021 article by founding president Pano Kanelos. In December 2022, The Free Press published information about the Twitter Files, after Twitter CEO Elon Musk provided Weiss with access to records of Twitter's internal communications. The information Weiss discussed included blacklisting of accounts and the suppression of "trending" topics. For their Twitter Files coverage, Bari Weiss, Matt Taibbi, and Michael Shellenberger shared the inaugural Dao Prize for Excellence In Investigative Journalism, awarded by the conservative organization National Journalism Center.

In March 2024, The Free Press stated the crime rate in Austin, Texas, had increased under district attorney José Garza when some crime rates had actually gone down. In 2024, the Austin Statesman stated that overall crime was down 11% compared to 2020. The Texas Tribune questioned the Free Press's claims about rising crime in Austin, Texas, suggesting that the outlet had misrepresented or oversimplified local statistics.

=== Gaza war ===
In late 2023, articles from The Free Press condemned the October 7 attacks and criticized mainstream media coverage of the Gaza war for what it considered the "spread of misinformation". In 2024, The Free Press first reported on a video of NYU professor Amin Husain, in which he denies sexual and gender-based violence in the 7 October attack on Israel and describes New York as a "Zionist city" at a Students for Justice in Palestine rally. NYU suspended Husain after the video and the report were publicized.

David Klion wrote in The Guardian that Bari Weiss "used The Free Press to empower right-wing factions within established elite institutions" and to suppress progressive and pro-Palestinian views, citing the criticism of NPR's reporting on the Trump administration's investigation into antisemitism at Columbia University as an example.

In August 2025, Reingold and Tanya Lukyanova investigated the pre-existing health problems of Palestinian children starving in the Gaza Strip. Reingold received support from Israeli Prime Minister Benjamin Netanyahu. The report was criticized by the president of Refugees International, who countered that children with pre-existing conditions were the most susceptible to famine. Drop Site News contacted the families of three of the children investigated by The Free Press. Each family said that their child's medical situation was driven by the famine and not by pre-existing conditions.

In 2025, conservative commentator Andrew Sullivan criticized The Free Press for what he views as its reluctance to stand up for the freedom of speech of anti-Israel activists. Writing for The New Statesman, journalist Ross Barkan called the publication "unapologetically hawkish and anti-Palestinian". Harrison Berger, writing at the Quincy Institute for Responsible Statecraft website, called the Free Press "a pro-Israel media outlet often sympathetic to the neoconservative worldview."
