= Alan Gershenhorn =

American businessman

Alan Gershenhorn is an American businessman who was the Executive Vice President and Chief Commercial Officer for United Parcel Service from June 2014 to June 2018. He joined the company in 1979 as a part-time package handler. He became a member of the UPS Management Committee in 2007 to serve as president of UPS International, where he was responsible for the UPS international package, freight forwarding, customs brokerage, and logistics businesses.

He became the company's first Chief Commercial Officer in 2014. In addition to his corporate responsibilities, Gershenhorn served as a Trustee of The UPS Foundation and a delegate of the World Business Council for Sustainable Development. In 2018, Gershenhorn joined 8VC as an advisor to the company. He also has been on the Board of Directors for Beacon Roofing Supply since May 2015.

Gershenhorn was born on Long Island, New York in 1958. He graduated from the University of Houston in 1982, where he was a member of Tau Kappa Epsilon fraternity.
