= 8VC =

American venture capital firm

- Type: Private
- Industry: Venture capital
- Founded: 2015; 11 years ago
- Founders: Joe Lonsdale; Jake Medwell
- Headquarters: Austin, Texas
- AUM: US$6 billion (2023)
- Website: www.8vc.com

8VC is an American venture capital firm founded by Joe Lonsdale.

== History ==
In 2015, shortly after the breakup of another venture capital firm Lonsdale helped co-found, Formation 8, Lonsdale co-founded 8VC (originally called "8 Partners") with 15 of the 25 employees from Formation 8. Originally based in San Francisco, Lonsdale relocated the firm's headquarters to Austin, Texas in 2020, shortly after moving there with his family.

The fund employs Jack Moshkovich and Denis Aven, who are both respectively sons of Russian oligarchs Vadim Moshkovich and Petr Aven. Lonsdale posted about these employees on X, saying, "I'm lucky to live in the greatest country in the world, and it will remain as such if we can keep working with the top talent of all backgrounds, including, yes, Chinese and Russians and Israelis et al., without demonizing people for imagined things they didn't do. We haven't taken any money from their fathers or their fathers’ friends, and don't need it."

In an interview with Real Assets Adviser magazine, Lonsdale elaborated on the story behind the name of the firm: "I named it 8VC for several reasons. Eight is an important number in Judaism and in Asia, and I'm Jewish and some of my partners are Korean. Eight is an important number in a lot of cultures. There's also something called the Traitorous Eight in Silicon Valley, dating back to around the time William Shockley invented the transitor. He brought a team of eight engineers to Shockley Labs, but he was a terrible boss. He would give his employees lie detector tests. It was really a mess. When eight of them left to start Fairchild Semiconductor, Shockley considered them traitors. But then people from Fairchild ended up founding Intel, National Semiconductor, Sequoia, and Kleiner Perkins — all these great things. A lot of Silicon Valley came from the Traitorous Eight."

== Investments ==
8VC has invested in:

- Airbyte
- Anduril
- Bedrock Robotics
- Hyperloop One
- Synthego
- UBiome
- Cognition AI
- Epirus
- Saronic
