= Coleman Hughes =

American writer and podcaster (born 1996)

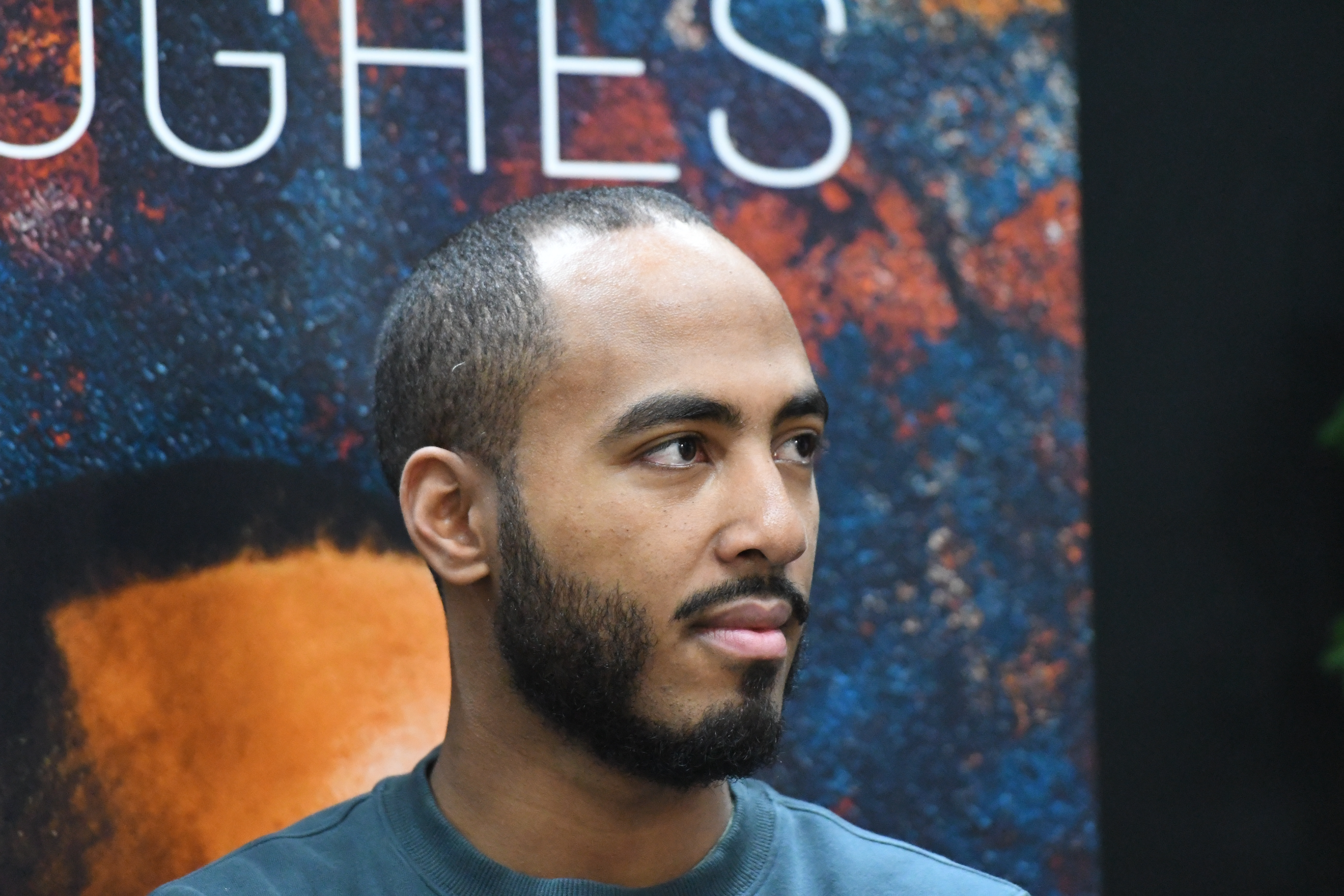
- Hughes in 2025
- Born: Coleman Cruz Hughes; February 25, 1996 (age 30); New Jersey, US
- Education: Columbia University (BA)
- Occupations: Writer; podcast host
- Organization(s): Quillette; 1776 Unites; Manhattan Institute for Policy Research
- Known for: Writing on issues related to race and racism
- Notable work: The End of Race Politics: Arguments for a Colorblind America (2024)
- Awards: Presidential Scholar; Forbes 30-under-30

Coleman Cruz Hughes (born February 25, 1996) is an American writer and podcast host. He was a fellow at the Manhattan Institute for Policy Research and a fellow and contributing editor at their City Journal, and he is the host of the podcast Conversations with Coleman. As of August 2026, he is a visiting professor at the University of Austin.

== Early life and education ==
Hughes is of African-American and Puerto Rican descent, and grew up in Montclair, New Jersey. His mother died when he was 19.

Hughes graduated from Newark Academy high school and was selected as a United States Presidential Scholar in 2014. He subsequently attended the Juilliard School and studied jazz trombone but later dropped out, due to his mother's death. After attending Columbia University, he graduated in 2020 with a B.A. in philosophy.

== Career ==
On June 19, 2019, Hughes testified before a U.S. House Judiciary subcommittee at a hearing on reparations for slavery, arguing against the campaign. He argued that "[i]f we were to pay reparations today, we would only divide the country further, making it harder to build the political coalitions required to solve the problems facing Black people today." In this vein, he highlighted mass incarceration and high homicide victimization rates as problems affecting Black Americans today. He suggested an alternative proposal of paying reparations to Black Americans who personally grew up under Jim Crow. Hughes went on to say that reparations to the descendants of slaves would insult many Black Americans and claimed they would make him and the "one-third of Black Americans who poll against reparations into victims without their consent."

In addition to writing for Quillette, Hughes has contributed to publications including The Spectator, The New York Times, The Wall Street Journal, National Review, the Washington Examiner, The Free Press, and the Heterodox Academy blog. In May 2020, he became a fellow of the Manhattan Institute for Policy Research and contributing editor of their City Journal. Hughes is listed as a scholar for the 1776 Unites project. In February 2020, Hughes discussed the topic of slavery reparations with Julianne Malveaux on Munk Debates.

Hughes is the host of the podcast Conversations with Coleman.

He is a visiting professor at the University of Austin.

== 2023 TED Talk ==
In April 2023, Hughes delivered a talk at the annual TED conference in Vancouver, Canada. Defending the idea of racial color blindness, he explained his perspective on treating people without regard to their race as individuals and in public policy. His talk encountered criticism from TED leadership and an internal employee group named "Black@TED", with efforts being made to prevent its release.

Chris Anderson, the head of TED, informed Hughes of internal opposition, citing a social scientist's claim that Hughes's talk delivered an inaccurate message. Hughes disputed this claim, arguing that the referenced research actually supported his position. TED proposed an unusual release strategy, combining his talk with a moderated debate, to which Hughes reluctantly agreed in order to ensure his message was heard. His opponent in the discussion, Jamelle Bouie, agreed with Hughes that race neutrality (i.e., racial color blindness) was preferable for personal interactions but argued that public policy should be more race-conscious.

== Views ==
In his 2024 book, The End of Race Politics: Arguments for a Colorblind America, Hughes argues that the aim of colorblindness is not to avoid "noticing" race but "to consciously disregard race as a reason to treat individuals differently and as a category on which to base public policy".

Hughes says he formerly believed the premise of Black Lives Matter—that, in his words, "racist cops are killing unarmed Black people"—but now believes that the existence of racial bias in deadly shootings does not survive scrutiny once factors other than race are taken into account. He has cited research from Roland G. Fryer Jr. and Sendhil Mullainathan, among others, in support of his stance. On the murder of George Floyd, Hughes believes that "there was clearly reasonable doubt on whether Chauvin caused Floyd's death".

Hughes has critiqued attempts to understand the Israeli–Palestinian conflict through parallels with colonialism, Jim Crow, and apartheid, arguing that a simplistic identification of the Black American struggle with that of the Palestinians does not do justice to Black history. He has suggested that the return of diaspora Jews bears closer comparison with the return of Black Americans to Liberia, adding that both movements are open to similar criticisms in retrospect. He believes that Israel's war in Gaza does not constitute a genocide and has debated the topic on The Joe Rogan Experience.

Hughes voted for Joe Biden in the 2020 United States presidential election.

== Reception ==
Writing in The Washington Post in 2018, Megan McArdle called Hughes "an undergraduate at Columbia University but already a thinker to be reckoned with." Nick Gillespie wrote in Reason in 2019 that Hughes had "emerged over the past year as one of the most prolific and insightful commentators on race and class in the United States." In 2020, Christopher Bollen wrote in Interview that Hughes "has become one of the most compelling and promising voices on the political landscape." In September 2020, Stéphanie Chayet, writing in the French newspaper Le Monde, identified Hughes as one of four "anti-conformists of anti-racism," along with Glenn Loury, Thomas Chatterton Williams, and John McWhorter. In December 2020, Hughes was listed on the Forbes 30-under-30 list for 2021 in the Media category.

== Music ==
Hughes began studying violin at age three. He is a hobbyist rapper—in 2021 and 2022, he released several rap singles on YouTube and Spotify, using the moniker COLDXMAN, including a music video for a track titled "Blasphemy", which appeared in January 2022. Hughes also plays jazz trombone with a Charles Mingus tribute band that played regularly at the Jazz Standard in New York City, before the club closed in December 2020.

== Publications ==
- Hughes, Coleman (2024). The End of Race Politics: Arguments for a Colorblind America. London & New York: Penguin Books. ISBN 978-0593332450.
