= Nalimov =

Nalimov may refer to one of the following persons

- Eugene Nalimov, a Russian chess programmer.
- Vasily Nalimov, a Russian philosopher and humanist.
