= Eliah G. Overbey =

American scientist and academic

- Education: UC San Diego (BS), University of Washington (PhD)
- Scientific career
- Fields: Genomics, bioastronautics
- Workplaces: Weill Cornell Medicine, University of Austin

Eliah G. Overbey is an assistant professor of Bioastronautics at the University of Austin and adjunct assistant professor of research in Computational Biomedicine at Weill Cornell Medicine. She co-founded the Space Omics and Medical Atlas (SOMA), which has generated over 90% of all publicly available astronaut omics data.

== Education ==
Overbey received her BS in Computer Science from UC San Diego and her PhD in Genome Sciences from the University of Washington. She performed her postdoctoral research in Christopher E. Mason's lab on a fellowship from NASA. Overbey joined the University of Austin as a member of the founding faculty in 2024.

== Career ==
=== Space Omics and Medical Atlas (SOMA) ===
In 2021, Overbey led the collection of biospecimen samples from the Inspiration4 crew, collecting specimens from before, during, and after their mission. She then spearheaded efforts to generate and analyze various omics and molecular measurements, including whole genome, gene expression, chromatin accessibility, proteomic, metagenomic, and metatranscriptomic assays. This collection of data was made public in NASA's Open Science Data Repository in May 2024 and constitutes over 90% of publicly available astronaut omics data, which is necessary for the development of countermeasures for space colonization, including personalized medicine and pharmaceuticals.

The project gained national coverage with ranging interpretations. The New York Times and Science highlighted the vast changes that occurred during just 3 days in orbit, while The Washington Post emphasized that scientists see no showstoppers for a mission to Mars. SOMA also found evidence to support previous telomere lengthening results from the NASA Twin Study. The Polaris Dawn crew have also participated in the study, but their data is not yet published. Notably, Jared Isaacman, the current nominee for NASA Administrator, was a research subject in both missions.

=== Space Mission Development ===
Overbey has been developing scientific competitions for the Space Exploration and Research Agency (SERA) and research missions for BioAstra, where she serves as chief scientific officer.

=== University of Austin (UATX) ===
In 2024, Overbey joined the University of Austin (UATX) as a member of the founding faculty, citing hostile work environments for Jewish students at other universities, suppression of free speech on college campuses, and the desire to build new programs to train students for Mars colonization.

== Publications ==
Foundational papers from the 2024 Nature SOMA collection.

- Overbey, E. G.; Kim, J.; Tierney, B. T.; et al. (2024). "The Space Omics and Medical Atlas (SOMA) and international astronaut biobank". Nature 632 (8027): 1145–1154. https://doi.org/10.1038/s41586-024-07639-y
- Overbey, E. G.; Ryon, K.; Kim, J.; Tierney, B. T.; et al. (2024). "Collection of biospecimens from the Inspiration4 mission establishes the standards for the Space Omics and Medical Atlas (SOMA)". Nature Communications 15 (1): 1–14. https://doi.org/10.1038/s41467-024-48806-z
- Jones, C. W.; Overbey, E. G.; Lacombe, J.; et al. (2024). "Molecular and physiological changes in the SpaceX Inspiration4 civilian crew". Nature 632 (8027): 1155–1164. https://doi.org/10.1038/s41586-024-07648-x
