= Addepar =

American wealth management company

Addepar, Inc.
- Type: Private
- Industry: Financial technology
- Founded: September 2009; 16 years ago
- Founders: Joe Lonsdale; Jason Mirra
- Headquarters: New York City, United States
- Number of locations: 7 (2024)
- Area served: Worldwide
- Key people: Joe Lonsdale (Chairman); Eric Poirier (CEO)
- Products: Addepar Platform; Open API
- Services: Financial software; Investment portfolio analysis; Investment performance reporting
- Number of employees: 1000 (2023)
- Website: addepar.com

Addepar, Inc. is a cloud based American wealth management software platform for registered investment advisors (RIAs) specializing in data aggregation, analytics, and portfolio reporting. Addepar's clientele is primarily high-net-worth and ultra-high-net-worth individuals and companies.

== History ==
=== Origin ===
In 2003, Joe Lonsdale, along with Peter Thiel and others, founded Palantir Technologies. In 2009, Lonsdale launched Addepar with Jason Mirra, another Palantir employee. One of their earliest clients was Mark Zuckerberg. The company name is based on a line in Ovid’s Metamorphoses meaning “Add a little to a little and you’ll have a great amount.”

=== Management transition ===
In 2013, Addepar sought to transition out of start-up mode, replacing Lonsdale and Michael Paulus with new CEO Eric Poirier, previously of Palantir, and hiring a COO to start building out the company's management. Peter O'Brien is the CRO and Janeen France is the CCO.

=== Funding and expansion ===
In 2017, Addepar received a $140 million round of funding from Valor Equity Partners. The same year, the company partnered with Morgan Stanley, providing software that consolidated information and tailored reporting about the assets of high net-worth Morgan Stanley clients.

In May 2017, Addepar acquired AltX, a machine learning platform aimed at alternative investments.

In 2019, Addepar launched a mobile app for its portfolio management software.

In 2021, they raised $150 million in a series F round, and then in 2025 raised $230 million in a series G.

In 2025, Addepar acquired Arcus, a small AI startup, for an undisclosed amount.

== Products and services ==
=== Open API ===
In September 2016, Salesforce.com announced their partnership with Addepar for Salesforce's Wave Financial Services Cloud for financial advisers, making it easier to see across asset classes and produce a single visual for their clients. One month later, Addepar released their Open API.
