= Rusagro =

Russian agricultural company

- Type: Public limited company
- Traded as: LSE: AGRO; MCX: RAGR
- Industry: Agriculture
- Founded: 1995
- Headquarters: Moscow, Russia
- Revenue: $4.73 billion (2025)
- Operating income: $445 million (2025)
- Net income: $238 million (2025)
- Total assets: $6.58 billion (2025)
- Total equity: $3.11 billion (2025)
- Website: www.rusagrogroup.ru

Rusagro (Russian: Русагро) is one of Russia's largest agricultural companies, and a major producer of pork, fats and sugar. It was established in 1995 as a sugar producer. Maxim Basov is the company's Chief Executive Officer.

== History ==
In 2001, Rusagro bought Rosprod, a rival sugar trading firm. By 2005 the company co-owned nine sugar beet farms in Belgorod Oblast.

The company originally planned an IPO for 2010, which was delayed due to the volatility of the Russian market. The company was listed on the London Stock Exchange in April 2011. Prior to the IPO, 95% of Rosagro was controlled by company founder Vadim Moshkovich and his family.

The company has grown significantly after 2014, benefiting from the weaker ruble, as well as bans on pork imports from the European Union. In 2016 the company filed a bankruptcy claim against Razgulay. Since 2016 the company exports corn to the Asia-Pacific region through its subsidiary in the Russian Far East. In 2017 it announced plans to expand meat production to northeastern China, and to invest $1 billion in dairy production. In September 2021, CEO Maxim Basov announced that SPO and call for money is beyond Rusagro scope. Meanwhile, in the same month, Maxim Basov increased his stake from 7,5 to 7,73% during “Rusagro” SPO, buying 250000 GDR for 3,47 million dollars. Maksim Vorobyov, businessman and brother of governor of Moscow Oblast Andrey Vorobyov, in his turn, has bought 10,14% of shares of Rusagro, becoming the second largest shareholder after Vadim Moshkovich (51,7%)
