= Formation 8 =

American venture capital firm (2011–2015)

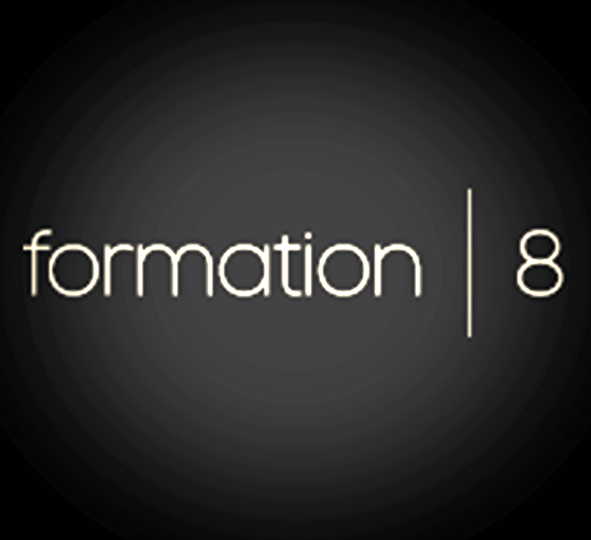
- Type: Private
- Industry: Private equity
- Founded: 2011
- Founders: Joe Lonsdale; Brian Koo; Jim Kim
- Defunct: November 2015
- Fate: Disbanded by its owners
- Headquarters: San Francisco, California, United States
- Products: Venture capital
- AUM: $948,000,000
- Website: formation8.com

Formation 8 was an American venture capital firm founded in 2011 by Joe Lonsdale, Jim Kim, and Brian Koo. The company was headquartered in San Francisco, California.

The firm was one of the most successful venture capital firms in the industry before abruptly disbanding in November 2015.

== History ==
The company was founded in 2011 by three partners: Jim Kim, Brian Koo and Joe Lonsdale. The team was later joined by James Zhang of Softbank China Venture Capital and BioDiscovery and Tom Baruch, founder of CMEA Capital and Director of Intermolecular. The firm added Gideon Yu, the former Facebook Chief Financial Officer who is now president of the San Francisco 49ers, as a special adviser to the firm.

In 2012, Formation 8 intended to close its first round fund with $200 million, but delayed until 2013 to accommodate more limited partners. In April 2013, it closed its first round fund with $448 million. It recorded a net internal rate of return (IRR) of 95%, easily making it one of the best performing funds in the industry. Its notable hits included Oculus, acquired by Facebook for $2 billion, and RelateIQ, the startup bought by Salesforce.com for $390 million.

In 2013, Fortune Magazine described the firm as "the hottest venture capital since Andreessen."

In December 2014, it closed a second fund of $500 million, and added some billion dollar unicorn startups to it portfolio, including Illumio and South Korean mobile company Yello Mobile.

In November 2015, the company disbanded, and the founders went their separate ways, reportedly because the founding partners had different investment strategies and interests. Axios reported closure was due to a string of bad investments and Koo leveraging a fund without limited partner approval via a loan.

== Portfolio companies ==
- Aka Study
- Augury
- Blend Labs
- Context Relevant
- Foro Energy
- Hyperdyadic
- LearnSprout
- Oculus
- OpenGov
- RelateIQ
- Venturebeat
- Wish (ContextLogic)
- Yello Mobile
