= Zachary Bookman =

American government technology entrepreneur

Zachary Bookman (born 1980) is an American businessperson. He is co-founder and former CEO of OpenGov, a company that sells cloud software to local governments and state agencies.

== Early life and education ==
Bookman grew up in Cabin John, Maryland outside of Washington, D.C. Bookman holds a BA from the University of Maryland, a JD from the Yale Law School, and an MPA from the Harvard Kennedy School. In 2007–2008, Bookman received a Fulbright Fellowship to study transparency and corruption in Mexico.

== Career ==
Bookman served as a law clerk to the Honorable Sandra S. Ikuta on the U.S. Court of Appeals for the Ninth Circuit, later working as a trial litigator at Keker, Van Nest & Peters in San Francisco. He then worked as an advisor on the Anti-Corruption Task Force at the International Security Assistance Force headquarters in Kabul, Afghanistan.

Bookman co-founded OpenGov in 2012 with Joe Lonsdale. OpenGov received investments from Thrive Capital starting in 2013, and in 2017 Bookman participated in a White House summit organized by Jared Kushner, the brother of Thrive Capital's founder. In 2021 Bookman took a cross-country bike ride from the San Francisco Bay to the Chesapeake Bay to visit with local government leaders. He stepped down from his role as OpenGov CEO in April 2026.

== Personal life ==
In September 2019, Bookman joined an expedition with mountain guide Garrett Madison to attempt a late season ascent of Mount Everest. The guide called off the attempt while the group was in base camp, which Madison described as a decision based on dangerous conditions. In March 2020, Bookman filed a lawsuit seeking damages over the non-refundable expedition fee, alleging the guide had canceled the trip for reasons unrelated to safety. In December 2021, the case was settled with Bookman agreeing through a stipulated judgment that he is not entitled to a refund for the trip.
