= Retraction index =

The retraction index is a measure of how likely an article published in a given academic journal will be retracted. It is calculated by multiplying the number of retracted articles in a journal during a given time period by 1,000, and then dividing the result by the total number of articles published in that journal during the same period. The term was coined in a 2011 editorial by Ferric Fang and Arturo Casadevall, the co-editors-in-chief of the journal Infection and Immunity. In their original editorial, Fang and Casadevall also showed a strong positive correlation between a journal's retraction index and its impact factor. Among the 17 journals they analyzed, the New England Journal of Medicine had the highest retraction index. The New England Journal of Medicine responded to the Feng and Casadevall editorial with a statement criticizing it for only considering papers with abstracts. The statement argued that because most articles published in each issue of the Journal do not have abstracts, the journal's retraction index appeared artificially high. They did not identify a mechanism for why this relationship might exist, but suggested that it might be because researchers are more willing to cut corners to get a paper published in a higher-impact journal.
