= Eugene Nalimov =

Russian chess programmer (born 1965)

- Education: Novosibirsk State University
- Occupation: Computer programmer

Eugene Nalimov (born Евгений Викторович Нали́мов (Yevgeny Viktorovich Nalimov) in 1965 in Novosibirsk, U.S.S.R.) is a chess programmer and former Microsoft employee, currently working for Context Relevant.

Starting in 1998, he wrote a tablebase generator which included many different endgames. He received a ChessBase award at the ChessBase meeting in Maastricht in 2002 for his work.

Nalimov has an M.Sc. from Novosibirsk State University. He started a Ph.D. dissertation, but did not finish it.

== See also ==
- Nalimov tablebase
