= Scarbrough Building =

Commercial building in Austin, Texas, U.S.

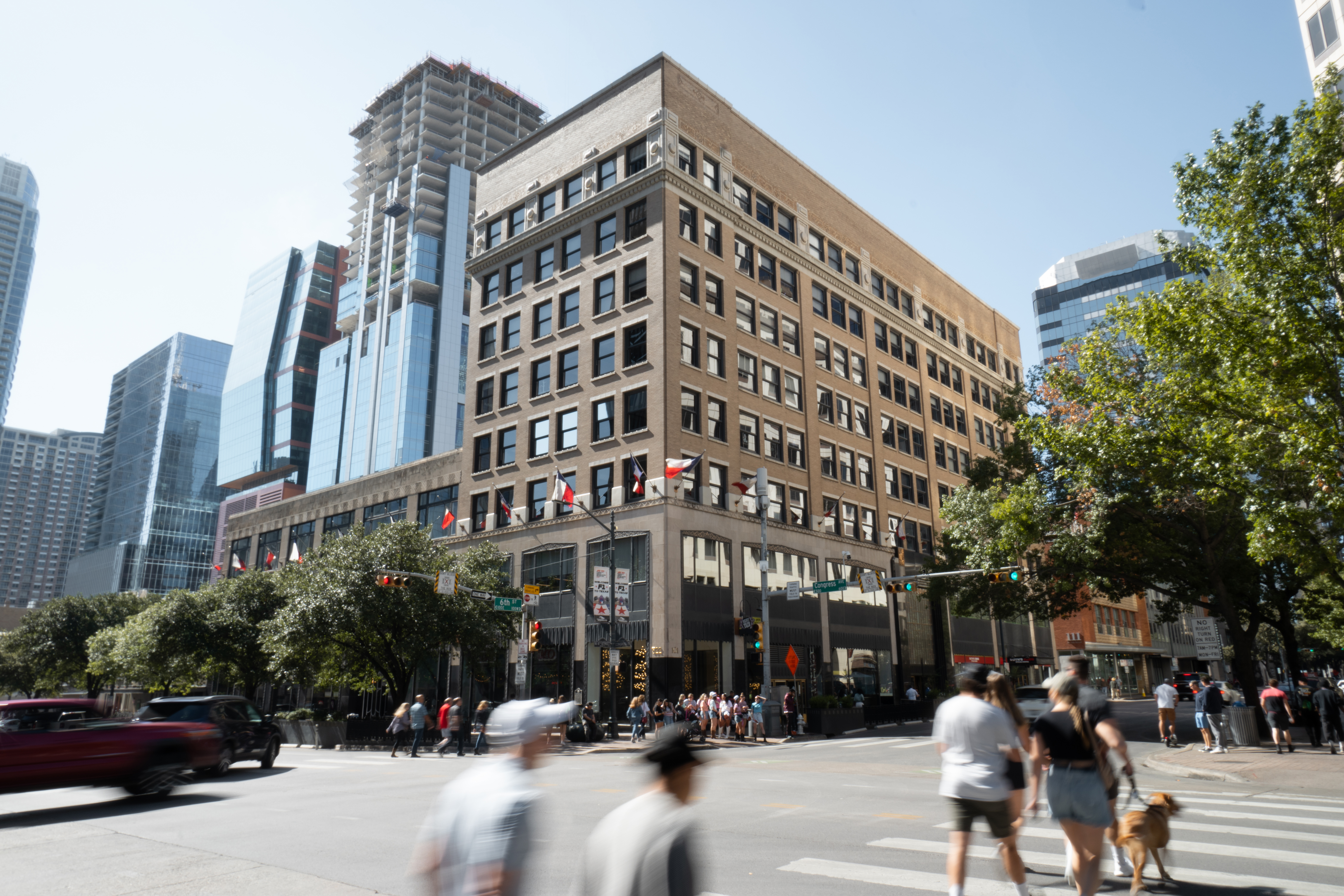
- The Scarbrough Building in 2023

General information
- Architectural style: Chicago; Art Deco
- Location: 101 W. Sixth Street, Austin, Texas, U.S. 78701
- Coordinates: 30.2680°N 97.7433°W
- Named for: Emerson Monroe Scarbrough, Sr.
- Groundbreaking: 1908
- Completed: 1910
- Renovated: 1931

Height
- Height: 110 feet (34 m)

Technical details
- Floor count: 8

Design and construction
- Architect: Sanguinet & Staats

Renovating team
- Architects: Wyatt C. Hedrick, Edwin C. Kreisle

The Scarbrough Building is a historic commercial building in downtown Austin, Texas, United States. Located on the corner of Congress Avenue and Sixth Street, the Chicago-style building was originally home to the flagship E.M. Scarbrough & Sons department store, simply known as Scarbrough's by locals. The building was the first steel-framed high-rise in Austin. In 1931, a renovation introduced Art Deco elements to the building; the renovation also made Scarbrough's the first retailer to have air conditioning (“manufactured weather”) west of the Mississippi River. The building was named a Recorded Texas Historic Landmark in 2001.

== History ==
Scarbrough Building
- Interactive map of Scarbrough Building

Recorded Texas Historic Landmark
- Designated: 2001
- Reference no.: 12733

The building was initially constructed starting in 1908 by Emerson Monroe Scarbrough, Sr., a former Confederate soldier, to house the flagship location for his department store. The retail store had originally opened in 1874 in Rockdale, Texas under the name of H.P. Hale, later becoming Scarbrough & Hicks. In 1893 Scarbrough left R.H. Hicks in charge of the store and moved with his family to Austin, expanding the business to a new location in the Kreisle Building at the 400 block of Congress Avenue. In 1905, Scarbrough hired architects Sanguinet & Staats to design a new building for the department store. When the new building was completed in 1909, it was the tallest in the state, but George W. Littlefield added a ninth story to his new building across the street to steal the title a year later.

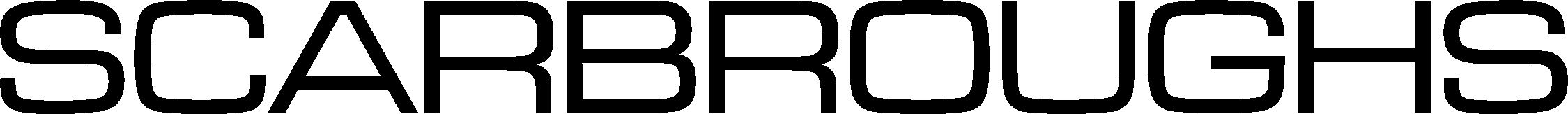
Scarbrough's department store final logo

In an era where goods were bargained, Scarbrough's was a pioneer in price tagging every item in the store. E.M. Scarbrough bought out and renamed the business with his sons, J. William and Lemuel Scarbrough, in 1913. In 1931, the Scarbrough sons hired architects Wyatt C. Hedrick and Edwin C. Kreisle for a renovation of the building. The Scarbrough Building was completely remodeled in an Art Deco facade, with shop windows widened from 6 ft. (2 m). In its heyday, the department store occupied 95,000 sq. ft. (8,800 m^{2}) spanning three stories, including 10 departments on the ground floor alone.

Growth after World War II would redefine shopping habits among the city's new residents. In the 1970s, a branch store was opened at Highland Mall. In 1981, a Scarbrough's store opened as an anchor at Barton Creek Square. The struggling downtown store closed its doors in 1982 after dismal Christmas season sales. The last remaining Scarbrough's store, located on North Lamar Boulevard, closed its doors in December 2009.

After Scarbrough's department store closed, the building's ground floor and basement were home to numerous retail stores, including Brooks Brothers and Gold's Gym. Punch Bowl Social, an entertainment venue, signed a lease for the ground floor and basement level of the building in 2019.

In 2023, the Building became the campus of the new University of Austin, a private university which was founded two years prior.

== Gallery ==
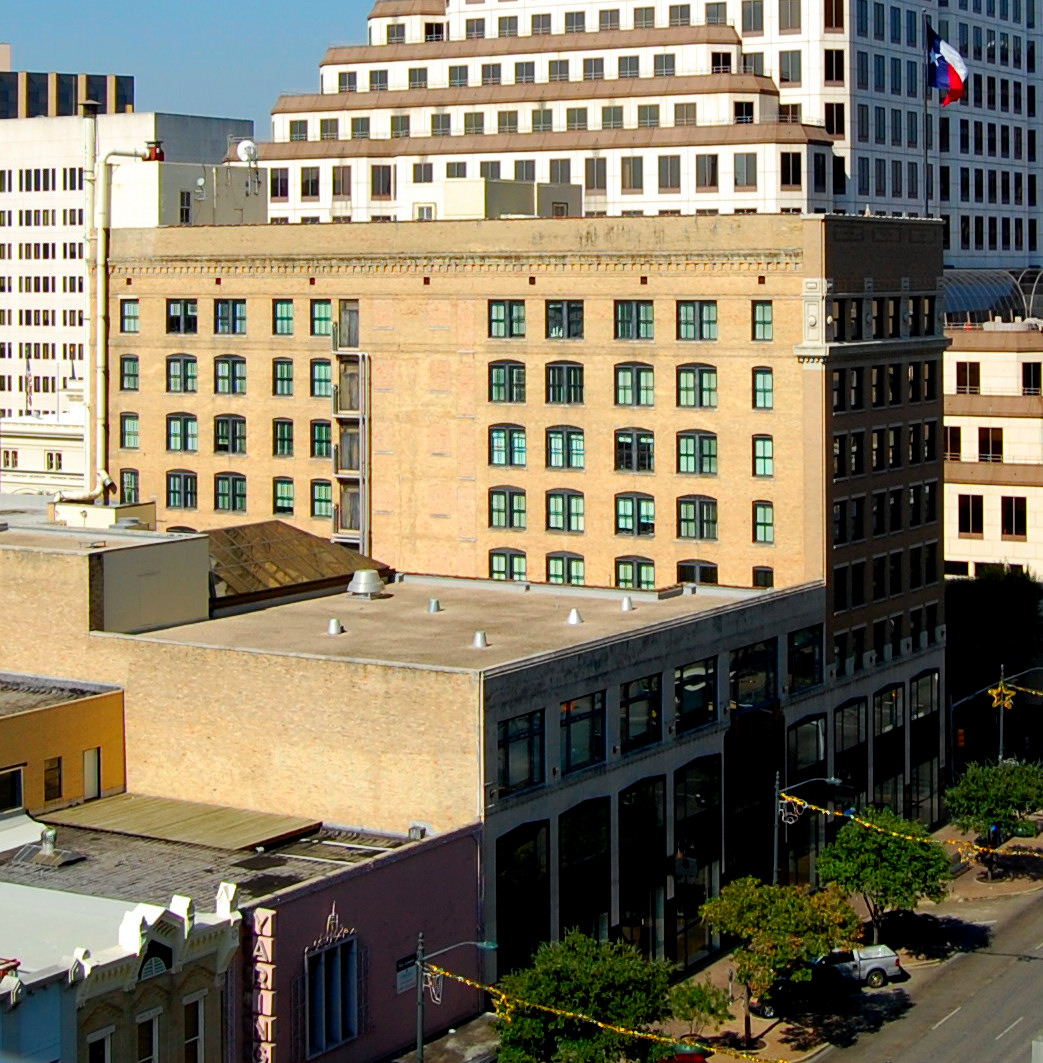
Bird's eye view of the Scarbrough Building in 2007

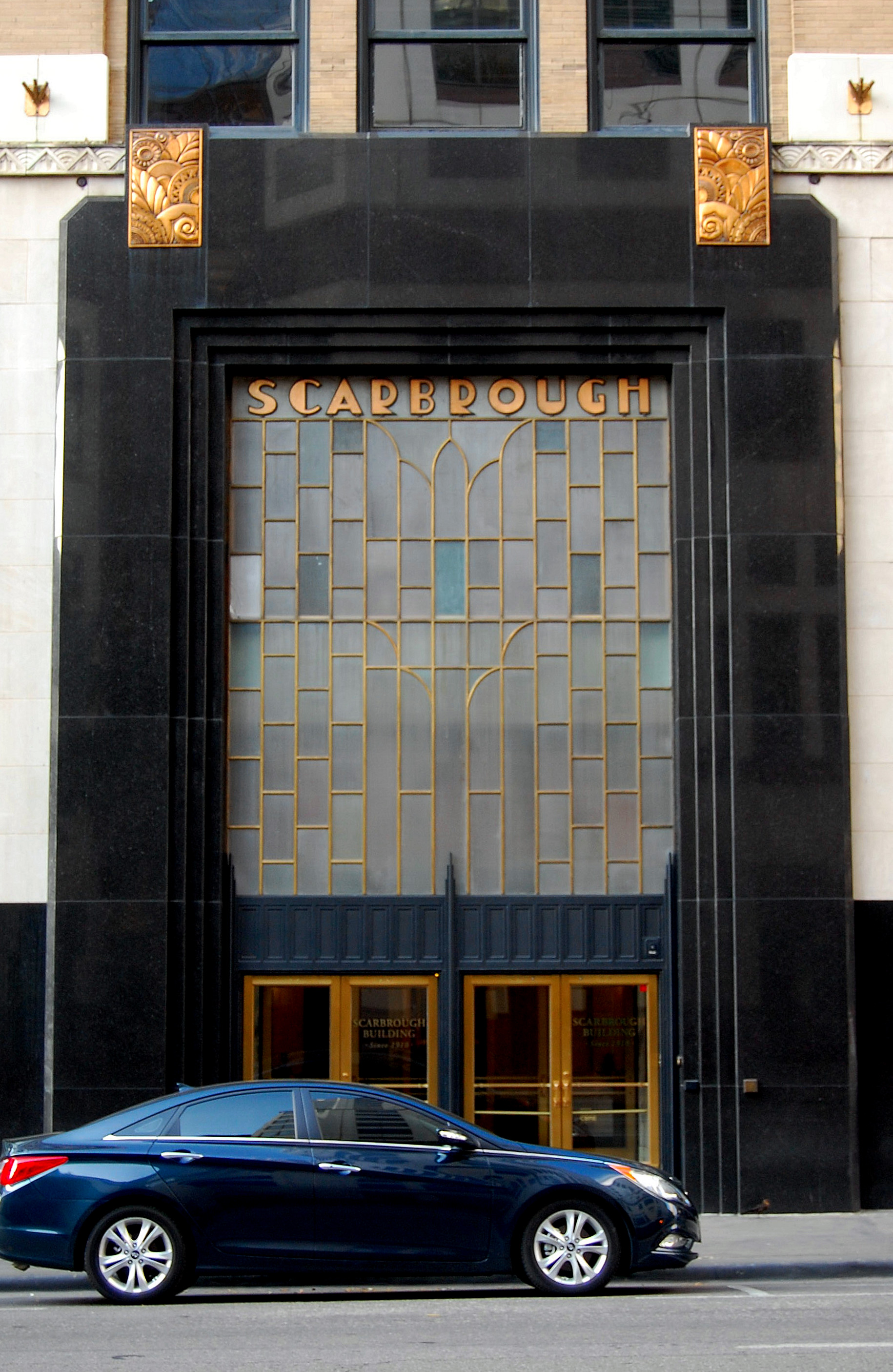
Sixth Street entrance

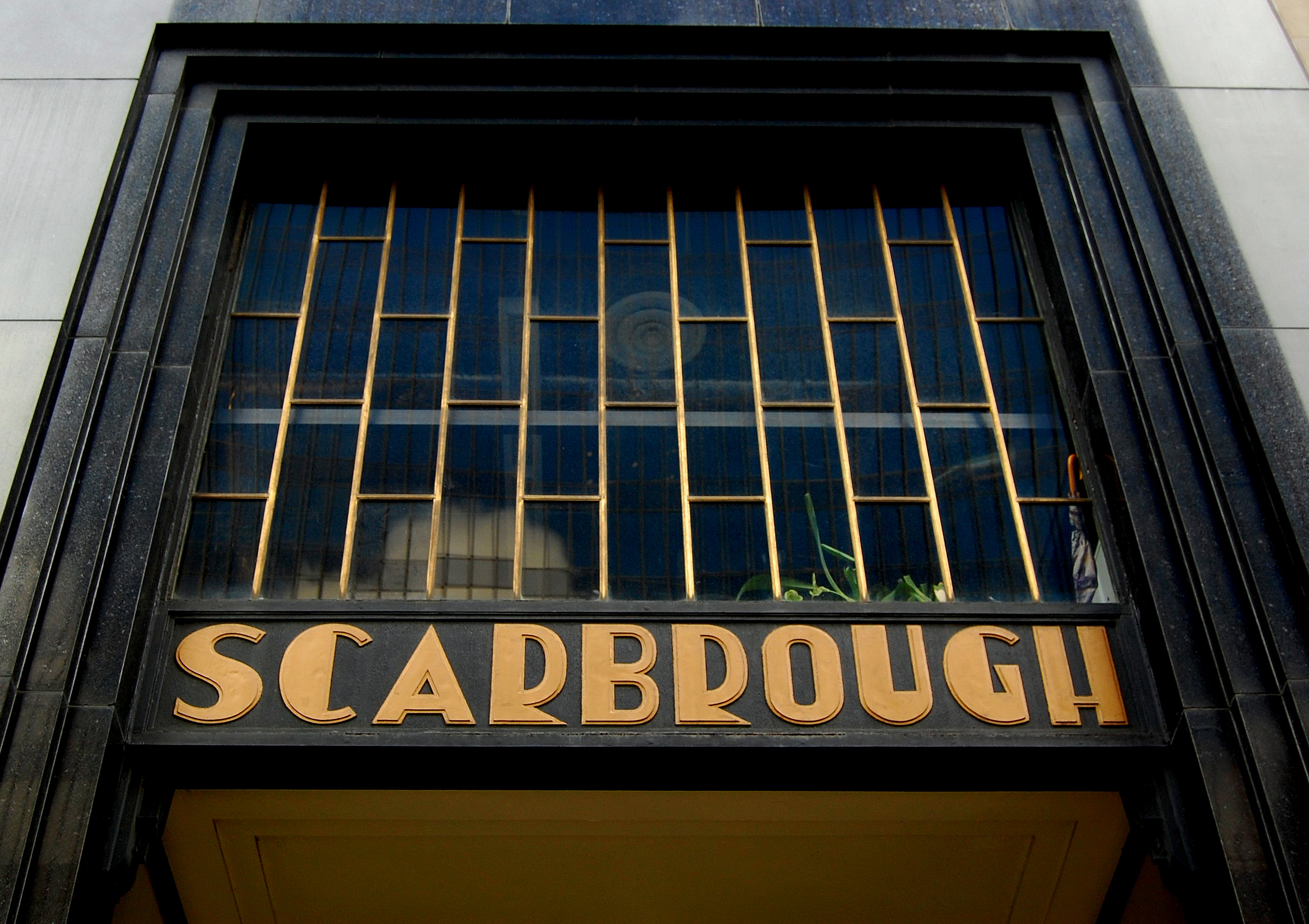
Close-up view of Art Deco ornamentation
