= Nora Demleitner =

German-American jurist and academic administrator (born 1966)

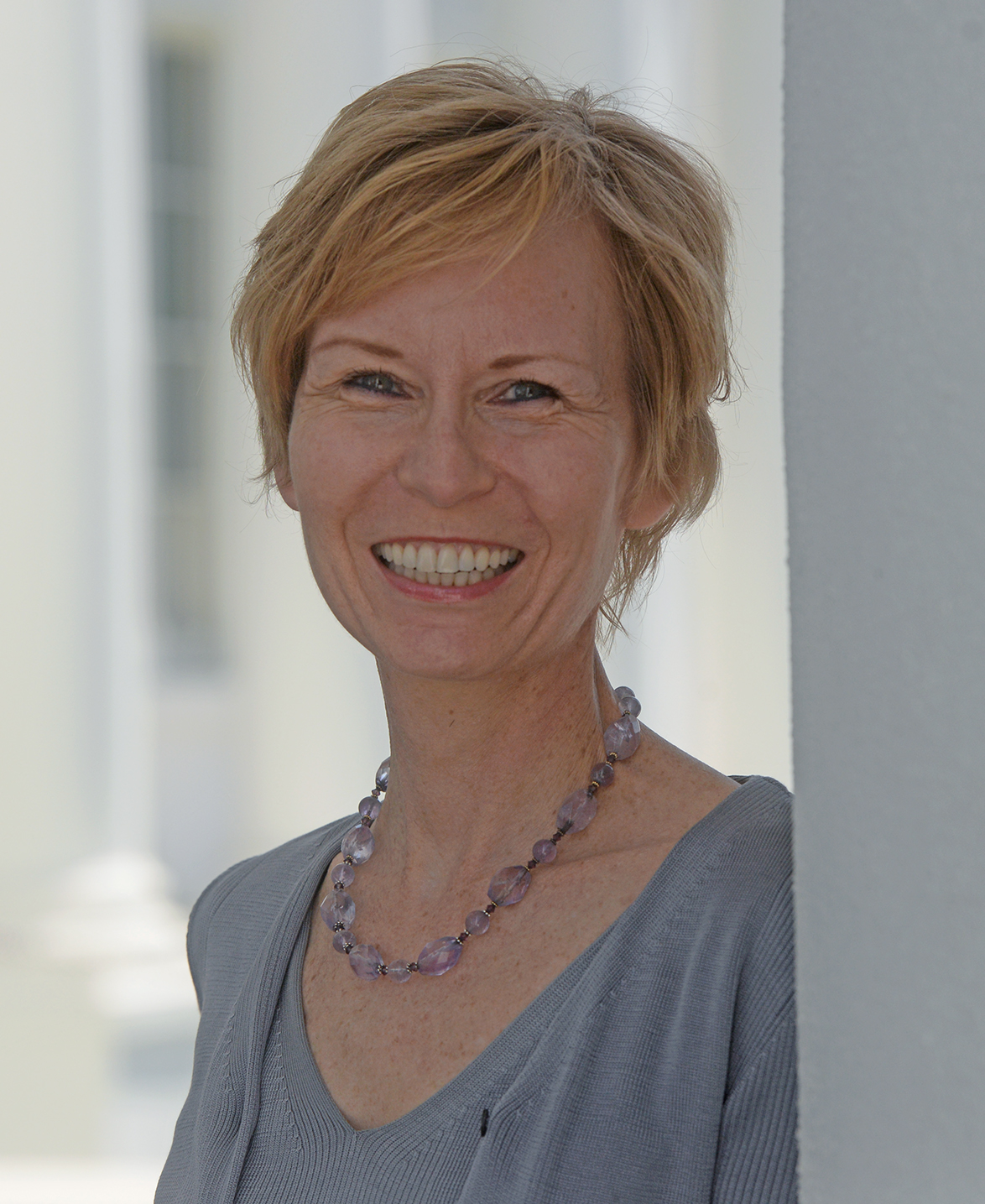

President of St. John's College (Annapolis/Santa Fe)
- In office 2022–2025
- Preceded by: Pano Kanelos
- Succeeded by: Susan Paalman

Personal details
- Born: December 11, 1966 (age 59) Schwabach, West Germany (now Germany)
- Party: Democratic
- Education: Bates College (BA); Yale University (JD); Georgetown University (LLM)

Nora V. Demleitner (born 1966) is a German-American jurist and academic administrator. She was the president of St. John's College - Annapolis from 2022–2025. Prior to this, she served as the dean of Washington and Lee University School of Law from 2012-2015 and dean of Hofstra University School of Law from 2007-2012.

== Early life, education, and politics ==
A native of Germany, Demleitner earned a B.A. degree summa cum laude from Bates College and a J.D. degree from Yale Law School, where she served as symposium editor of the Yale Law Journal. She also holds a master's degree in international and comparative law, with distinction, from Georgetown University Law Center. She also earned a master's degree in international and comparative law from Georgetown University Law Center in 1994.

After law school, Demleitner worked as a judicial clerk for then-United States Court of Appeals for the Third Circuit judge—and future U.S. Supreme Court Associate Justice—Samuel Alito. Demleitner is a self-described Democrat who supports abortion rights and LGBT+ equality. Demleitner is a self-described Democrat who supports abortion rights and LGBT equality.

== Professional career ==
In 1994, Demleitner became a professor at St. Mary's University School of Law in San Antonio, Texas, at the age of 27. She earned tenure in 1998 upon her earliest eligibility. In the fall of 1999, Demleitner worked as a visiting professor of law at the University of Michigan Law School. Demleitner joined the faculty of the Hofstra University School of Law in 2001 and served as vice dean from 2006 through 2007 and dean from 2007 through 2012. In 2011, the school was renamed the Maurice A. Deane School of Law at Hofstra University in honor of a generous alumnus who made a $20 million commitment to the school. Demleitner served as dean of Washington and Lee University School of Law from 2012 through 2015, during which time the school completed its $35 million capital campaign, renovated the law school building, Lewis Hall, and substantially increased the graduate employment and bar passage rates and diversity of the student body. From 2012 until 2021 Demleitner held the Roy L. Steinheimer, Jr. Chair at Washington and Lee.

On August 17, 2026, Towson University announced Demleitner's appointment as the inaugural executive director of the Ben and Myrna Cardin Center for Civic Engagement & Civil Discourse, effective September 8, 2026. In announcing the appointment, Towson University President Mark R. Ginsberg said Demleitner would partner with former U.S. Senator Ben Cardin and Myrna Cardin, the center's co-founders, to lead the center and advance its work in civic engagement, civil discourse, public service, and democratic participation.

== President of St. John's College ==
Demleitner became the 25th president of St. John's College in Annapolis in January 2022, becoming the first woman to serve as president of the college's Annapolis campus.

During her presidency, Demleitner emphasized preserving St. John's distinctive discussion-based Great Books program while preparing students for career and civic life. During her tenure, the college expanded student wellness initiatives and opportunities outside the classroom, invested in facilities and infrastructure, strengthened financial accessibility, and developed career pathways and partnerships with graduate and professional schools. Her tenure also included the completion of the college's Freeing Minds capital campaign, which raised more than $326 million to support financial aid, student services, operating expenses, and campus improvements. Demleitner also expanded institutional partnerships internationally and strengthened the college's engagement with organizations and communities in Maryland.

== Publications ==
Demleitner has published extensively on criminal justice, higher education, sentencing, and collateral consequences in law reviews, peer-reviewed publications, and national media. She is a lead author of Sentencing Law and Policy, a legal casebook on sentencing law and policy now in its fifth edition.

Demleitner is the author of Built to Punish: How the Criminal Justice System Undermines American Society, a narrative nonfiction book scheduled for publication by Prometheus Books in March 2027. The book examines changes in crime and punishment in the United States over the past four decades and argues for a criminal justice system centered on accountability, fairness, and human dignity.

== Public service and professional affiliations ==
Demleitner serves as a senior fellow at the Council on Criminal Justice, where her work centers on the intersection of higher education, knowledge formation, and criminal justice.

Maryland Governor Wes Moore appointed Demleitner as a member of Maryland's Statewide Administrative Charging Committee, which reviews law-enforcement agencies' investigations of police-misconduct complaints and recommends disciplinary actions.

Demleitner is a member of the American Law Institute and a Fellow of the European Law Institute. She is also an elected member of the Council on Criminal Justice and chairs the board of the Collateral Consequences Resource Center.

== 2009 Supreme Court of the United States vacancy ==
On May 17, 2009, National Public Radio legal affairs correspondent Nina Totenberg speculated that Demleitner might be among a list of potential nominees being considered by President Obama to replace David Souter who "have gotten little or no attention" by the media. "I was very surprised that NPR mentioned me," Demleitner told Newsday. "It's an incredible honor to be mentioned." Demleitner also told Newsday, however, that she had not been contacted by anyone from the Obama administration.

== See also ==
- Barack Obama Supreme Court candidates
