= OpenGov =

Government technology company

OpenGov Inc.
- Type: Private
- Industry: Enterprise software
- Founded: 2012; 14 years ago
- Founders: Nate Levine; Dakin Sloss; Joe Lonsdale; Zachary Bookman
- Headquarters: San Francisco, California, U.S.
- Key people: Thiago Sá Freire (CEO)
- Products: ERP cloud; budgeting & planning; financials; citizen services
- Number of employees: c. 700 (2024)
- Parent: Cox Enterprises
- Website: opengov.com

OpenGov Inc. is a private technology company headquartered in San Francisco. In February 2024, minority owner Cox Enterprises agreed to acquire the company.

== History ==
OpenGov, which is headquartered in San Francisco, was founded in 2012 by Nate Levine, Dakin Sloss, Joe Lonsdale, and Zachary Bookman in response to the 2008 financial crisis. The company's founders and several advisors met while working with California Common Sense, a non-profit non-partisan organization, which advocates for open data and open government principles. The group founded OpenGov with the long-term goal of bringing a modern cloud enterprise resource planning (ERP) to local and state governments.

In April 2016, OpenGov acquired Ontodia, a leading developer of open data platform CKAN, allowing OpenGov to expand its reporting and transparency suite.

In February 2017, OpenGov said that it saw an increase in interest from clients and job applicants related to desire for increased government accountability after the election of President Donald Trump. The Wall Street Journal reported that OpenGov, a government technology start-up whose CEO attended a tech summit at the White House in June 2017, is part owned by Thrive Capital — a venture firm run by Jared Kushner's brother, Joshua. OpenGov's CEO, Bookman, was the only chief executive of a small firm among the 18 tech leaders to get a seat at the table with the president. According to the Wall Street Journal, a staff member suggested OpenGov participate after learning about the company in previous congressional roles.

In October 2017, OpenGov acquired government-serving tech company, Peak Democracy of Berkeley, California, to expand its public engagement, communication, and feedback tools. In September 2019, OpenGov acquired ViewPoint Cloud, a platform used by city and state governments to manage community development operations, such as permitting, licensing, inspections, and code enforcement.

In March 2020, OpenGov and GTY Technology Holdings settled lawsuits related to a past effort at a merger.

In April 2020, OpenGov launched the first fully-integrated cloud enterprise resource planning (ERP) system designed specifically for local government. In October 2020, OpenGov acquired ClearRec, a Texas-based company, to incorporate its step-by-step bank reconciliation process technology into the OpenGov ERP Cloud.

In June 2021, OpenGov acquired ProcureNow to enable its customers to run budgeting, procurement and financial operations through the same vendor. In July 2022, OpenGov acquired Cartegraph, a public cloud software developer, with funding from Cox Enterprises.

In February 2024, minority owner Cox Enterprises agreed to acquire OpenGov, valuing the company at $1.8 billion.

Bookman stepped down as CEO in April 2026, replaced by Thiago Sá Freire, who was previously OpenGov's president, chief operating officer, and president of field operations.

== Customers ==
As of February 2024, OpenGov serves 1,900 government entities, including state agencies, city governments, school districts, and other special districts. They offer subscriptions to these entities based on the number of products used and the number of employees who need access.

The city of Palo Alto was OpenGov's first customer, following a collaboration between the city and employees from nonprofit California Common Sense to launch a comprehensive open data platform.

Following a chain of cyberattacks and scandals, the city of Scranton, Pennsylvania, partnered with OpenGov to use its cloud based ERP to restore public trust, improve safety, and accelerate the city's operations. The city's Business Administrator, Karl Deeley, stated that Scranton's operations had not undergone any major changes since the 1980s, so its partnership with OpenGov will enable the city to decrease reliance on its old infrastructure.

In May 2021, Curry County, Oregon, stopped using OpenGov due to "glitches" in the software.

In September 2021, the municipality of Durango, Colorado, announced its partnership with OpenGov to increase transparency with its citizens by allowing them to view the city's finances, as well as the spending of other government entities, real time. The effort to increase transparency came after Durango's former finance director, Julie Brown, was caught embezzling over $700,000 across 11 years. Durango also lost millions of dollars through clerical errors in 2019, which OpenGov's software could reduce and prevent down the road.

As of February 2024, OpenGov is being used by the city of Los Angeles to prepare for the 2028 Summer Olympics.

Daniel Lurie signed a no-bid contract with OpenGov for the permitting system of San Francisco in October 2025 and hopes to extend it in 2026 through 2031. The contract raised questions about why Lurie avoided best practices like a competitive bidding process when choosing a permitting vendor, approved the contract despite staff concerns that the software did not have the functionality they needed, and raised questions about the connections of OpenGov's founders to the Mayor's nonprofit Tipping Point.

== Funding ==
OpenGov has raised $128 million from venture capital and angel investors. A $3 million Series A round in 2012 included venture funds 8VC, Founder Collective, Valiant Capital, and "a number of high-profile angel investors." In 2013, the company raised $4 million in further investment from 8VC and new investor Thrive Capital.

On May 15, 2014, OpenGov announced a new $15 million Series B round of funding including investments from Andreessen Horowitz, 8VC, and Thrive Capital.

An additional $25 million Series B round in October 2015 included additional investments from Andreessen Horowitz, 8VC, Thrive Capital, and Sway Ventures, as well as new investors Glynn Capital, Scott Cook, and Ashton Kutcher and Guy Oseary’s Sound Ventures. Marc Andreessen was also added to the board during the October 2015 round.

In May 2017, the company raised $30 million in a Series C founding round and in September 2019, the startup picked up an additional $51 million in a Series D round led by Weatherford Capital and 8VC (Lonsdale's investment firm), with participation from existing investor Andreessen Horowitz.

In mid-August 2021, Weatherford Capital, a private investment firm in Florida, closed nearly $355 million in its first round of investments for the government technology space, with OpenGov being one of the multiple civic technology companies that received a portion of the investments.

== See also ==
- E-government
