= University of Austin =

Private liberal arts university in Austin, Texas, U.S.

- Motto: Dare to Think
- Type: Private liberal arts university
- Established: 2021; 5 years ago
- Founders: Joe Lonsdale; Pano Kanelos; Niall Ferguson; Bari Weiss
- Accreditation: Unaccredited (candidate for accreditation)
- Endowment: $300 million (2025)
- Chairman: Joe Lonsdale
- President: Carlos Carvalho
- Academic staff: 52 (2025)
- Students: 150 (fall 2025)
- Location: Austin, Texas, U.S. 30.2680°N 97.74316°W
- Campus: Urban
- Colors: Navy and gold
- Website: uaustin.org

The University of Austin (UATX) is an unaccredited private liberal arts university located in Austin, Texas, United States. The university established a campus in Downtown Austin's Scarbrough Building, enrolling its first undergraduate cohort in the fall of 2024. It is certified by the Texas Higher Education Coordinating Board to award degrees and was granted "candidate for accreditation" status by the Middle States Commission on Higher Education in 2025. UATX does not charge tuition or accept government funding.

Conceived of in May of 2021 by Joe Lonsdale, Pano Kanelos, Niall Ferguson, and Bari Weiss, the University of Austin's founding was announced in October of 2021, billed as a new institution that could address problems in higher education. The announcement was met with significant media attention, with many praising the concept, but others were skeptical of its viability. The project was described by reviewers as "anti-woke" and "anti-cancel culture". Numerous prominent academics served as initial advisors to UATX.

The school, having raised $200 million in private donations prior to admitting its first class, offered full scholarships to every student accepted. Following another large donation in 2025 by American billionaire Jeff Yass, UATX announced that all tuition would be permanently free.

The inaugural class entered the school on September 2, 2024. For the second class, the school set a new admissions rule that applicants with high scores on standardized tests would be automatically accepted. The second class entered in the fall of 2025. At that point, the university's two classes, totaling 150 students, were educated by 34 academic staff members.

== History ==
=== Origins (2021–24) ===
The University of Austin was conceived in May 2021 when venture capitalist Joe Lonsdale, St. John's College President Pano Kanelos, British–American historian Niall Ferguson, and journalist Bari Weiss met in Austin. The proposal was publicized six months later in an article by Kanelos in Weiss's newsletter Common Sense (which subsequently evolved into The Free Press).

Founding faculty fellows included Peter Boghossian, Ayaan Hirsi Ali, and Kathleen Stock. Other advisors included former Harvard president Lawrence (Larry) Summers, former ACLU president Nadine Strossen, and former president of the American Enterprise Institute Arthur Brooks.

In November 2021, the university's website listed Robert Zimmer, Larry Summers, John Nunes, Gordon Gee, Steven Pinker, Deirdre McCloskey, Leon Kass, Jonathan Haidt, Glenn Loury, Joshua Katz, Vickie Sullivan, Geoffrey Stone, Bill McClay, and Tyler Cowen as advisors to the university.

On November 11, 2021, Zimmer announced his resignation from the university board, saying that UATX had made statements about higher education that "diverged very significantly from my own views". Shortly thereafter, Pinker followed suit. UATX apologized for creating "unnecessary complications" for Pinker and Zimmer by not clarifying [sooner] what their advisory roles entailed.

On June 9, 2022, the University of Austin opened applications for its "Forbidden Courses" program with two-week-long sessions in the old (pre-1954) Parkland Memorial Hospital in Dallas, Texas. Harlan Crow provided classroom space in Dallas. On July 6, 2022, the school announced that Richard Dawkins had joined its advisory board. In December 2022, board member Heather Heying resigned, stating that the school was not adequately invested in scientific inquiry and "does not represent my scientific and pedagogical values."

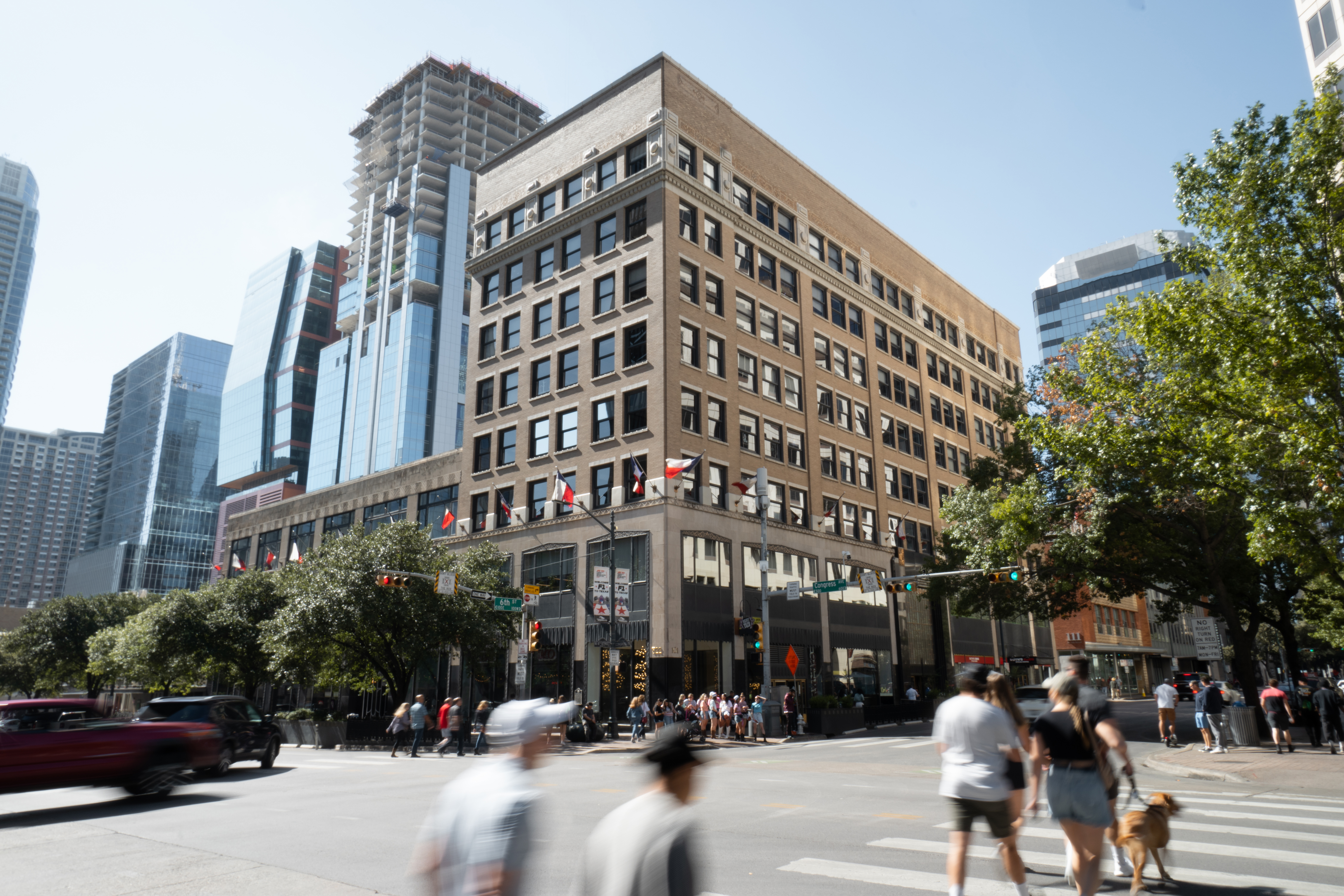
The Scarbrough Building in downtown Austin, home of the University of Austin

In September 2023, assistant provost Loren Rotner and vice president of communications Hillel Ofek, in a faction that involved board member Joe Lonsdale, criticized the leadership of founding president Pano Kanelos. They did not succeed in persuading others of their position. Rotner and Ofek temporarily left UATX.

After receiving certification in October 2023 from the Texas Higher Education Coordinating Board to award degrees, UATX began accepting applications for its first four-year undergraduate cohort enrolling in Fall 2024, and established a campus in Austin's Scarbrough Building. The entire class of 100 students received full four-year scholarships, paid from private donations. By November 2023, UATX had reportedly raised $200 million from 2,600 donors and received over 6,000 inquiries from potential faculty. Large donors behind the $200 million included Harlan Crow, Bill Ackman, Jeff Yass, and Len Blavatnik.

In late 2023, UATX reported a surge in interest from donors "horrified by the response at top-tier universities" to the 2023 Hamas-led attack on Israel. In June 2024, the University of Austin announced a $5 million bitcoin endowment in partnership with cryptocurrency platform Unchained Capital.

=== Active university (2024–present) ===
On September 2, 2024, UATX held a convocation for its inaugural group of students, the class of 2028, beginning the college's first academic year. By this time, tuition was about $32,000 per year and the school employed about 20 faculty members.

In November 2024, UATX was featured in a CBS News 60 Minutes segment titled "Disruptor U."

In January 2025, a group of board members led by Lonsdale convinced the board that Kanelos needed to leave the role of president and that UATX should emphasize technology in its curriculum and deemphasize the "great books". It was announced that Kanelos would serve as chancellor instead. Two months later, Rotner returned as associate provost and Ofek as chief strategy officer.

On April 2, 2025, the first day of spring quarter, Lonsdale summoned all faculty and staff and told them they must subscribe to the principles of anti-communism, anti-socialism, identity politics and anti-Islamism. When UATX professor Michael Lind asked for clarification, he was told that "communists" and "socialists" were people who don't "believe in private property" and who "hate the rich" and that the UATX board would make a case-by-case decision on whether "New Deal liberals" could work at the school.

On May 2, 2025, Carlos Carvalho was announced as the second president of UATX. The next day, the school held its annual First Principles Summit, at which Niall Ferguson warned UATX leaders to "think twice" about whether Donald Trump was truly in the wrong to threaten Harvard University and Harvard professors truly in the right to resist his plan. Mike Shires, chief of staff and senior vice president for strategy, left the school that month.

On July 15, 2025, the conservative Manhattan Institute urged Trump to predicate universities' federal funding on their compliance with a new set of rules. Two days later, Carvalho expressed support for this initiative. Nadine Strossen, Jonathan Rauch and Jonathan Haidt approached Carvalho with objections; Carvalho argued that UATX had always been a right-wing project. On July 18, Larry Summers posted to X that he had resigned from the advisory board "effective today ... as I am not comfortable with the course that UATX has set nor the messages it promulgates". Strossen, Rauch and Haidt also resigned. Kanelos resigned on October 1.

In September 2025, venture capitalist Peter Thiel, who had cofounded Palantir with Lonsdale, visited campus to lecture on "the biblical Antichrist." It was the first in a series of four talks he gave at UATX.

Nell Gluckman, writing in The Chronicle of Higher Education, reported that near the end of 2025 the UATX website indicated it had 34 staff members in addition to faculty, while LinkedIn showed that about 20 employees had departed during the year, including "the president, the provost, the lead fund raiser, the executive director of admissions, as well as people who worked in events, operations, and other positions". Mike Shires reflected, "Some of that was them just naturally moving on, some of that is the nature of start-ups, some of that is strategic decisions made by the leadership." Despite these departures, the school continued to obtain large donations and enrolled its second class.

On November 5, 2025, UATX announced, in conjunction with a $100 million gift from Libertarian investor Jeff Yass, that they will not charge tuition or accept government funding.

== Academics ==
UATX's undergraduate program begins with a core curriculum consisting of 15 courses based on a Great Books canon. In their junior and senior years, students specialize in interdisciplinary academic centers. A practical capstone project is undertaken across all four years. Faculty staff include Tim Kane, Boris Fishman, Eliah G. Overbey, Michael Shellenberger, and Coleman Hughes.

=== Admissions ===
Admission is based on a policy that requires "Academic Capability." This is demonstrated through performance on standardized tests or other public examinations, grade point average, class ranking, enrollment in an academically rigorous course of study (e.g., Advanced Placement or International Baccalaureate programs), and English composition and writing skills. The university also selects applicants who will provide intellectual pluralism for each class.

In March 2025, UATX introduced its "merit-first admissions policy" where applicants with at least a 1460 SAT, 33 ACT, or 105 CLT earn automatic admission. The automatic admission is contingent on meeting eligibility requirements and passing an integrity check.

=== Accreditation ===
UATX is a candidate institution for accreditation with the Middle States Commission on Higher Education (MSCHE). The Commission's most recent action on UATX's accreditation status on August 28, 2025 was to grant "candidate for accreditation" status and to make the university an official institutional member of MSCHE. According to its official website, UATX expects the final report of the accreditation evaluators to go to MSCHE in March 2028 and the university could be accredited prior to the issuance of its first undergraduate degrees.

=== Enrollment and personnel ===
As of August 2026, the university enrolls a freshman, sophomore, and junior class. There is no senior class yet, owing to its recent inception.

During the school's second academic year (2025–2026), there were 150 students at the school. Currently, there are 52 staff members.

== Reception ==
The initial announcement of the project received positive praise, including praise from libertarian nonprofit magazine Law & Liberty for ushering in "a new era in educational reform," and applause from conservative magazine The New Criterion for its efforts to "keep that old flame of free inquiry alive." New York Times columnist Ross Douthat saw the launch of a new university as a positive development, pointing out how few major universities have been established since the nineteenth century, while acknowledging how expensive doing so would be. He also saw conflicting forces in the project, including the "tension between the desire to promote great academic seriousness and the culture-war flag-waving that might be necessary to rally donor support".

The project also garnered some criticism. Initial responses to the project included criticism of the lack of a plan to achieve the project's goals. New York Times journalist Anemona Hartocollis questioned in 2021 whether the founders would be able to "translate a provocative idea into a viable institution," while The New Republic's Alex Shephard described the plan as "largely half baked". Jennifer Wunder, a professor at Georgia Gwinnett College who participated in the process of obtaining her institution's initial accreditation, in a since-deleted Twitter thread, described UATX's 2021 business plan timeline to establish accredited graduate and undergraduate programs as nearly impossible to meet. The proposal for a University of Austin was described in 2021 by Gabriella Swerling in The Daily Telegraph as "anti-cancel culture" and by Alex Shephard in The New Republic as "anti-woke".

After initially holding silent about the reasons for his resignation from UATX's advisory board, Steven Pinker told The Harvard Crimson that UATX had "confused freedom of speech with the political right"—that it had staffed itself primarily with people on the right, regardless of their position on free speech, extending to some opponents of it.

== See also ==
- Ralston College
