= Shooting bias =

Form of implicit racial bias

The term shooting bias, also known as "shooter bias", is a proposed form of implicit racial bias which refers to the apparent tendency among the police to shoot black civilians more often than white civilians, even when they are unarmed. In countries where white people aren't the majority, shooting bias may still apply, with different minority groups facing discrimination.

The concept proposes that the probability of being shot by the police depends on ethnicity in addition to the other known factors like location, the income of the neighborhood and whether or not the person is carrying a weapon as well as the emotions shown by the victim. Shooting bias is not limited to one race, as studies have shown that both black and white individuals demonstrated almost equivalent levels of shooting bias.

== Shooting bias among civilians ==
A study by Marleen Stelter et al. from 2023, investigated the shooting bias among civilians. A computer simulation was used in which participants were tasked with shooting armed individuals. These individuals were either White or corresponded to a stereotypical Arab appearance. The results show no significant difference in the occurrence of the shooting bias between civilians and the police. Therefor it can be questioned whether the origin of the shooting bias lies in police work and/or training or could more likely be an outcome of other social and cultural factors. However the hypothesis that shooting bias is rooted in stereotypical associations could not be confirmed in the study cited above.

== Key Questions in Literature ==
=== Benchmark ===
Violent crime is committed by a very small number of individuals. These individuals tend to come from very poor disadvantaged communities. Since minorities are overrepresented in these communities, minorities are also overrepresented in violent crime. Thus, any statistical analysis of police bias must take this into account. Using population, police-citizen interactions, or total arrests as a benchmark, we observe that black citizens appear more likely than white citizens to be fatally shot by police officers. Using violent crime arrests or weapons offense arrests, we observe that black citizens appear less likely to be fatally shot by police officers.

=== Resisting Arrest ===
Additionally, data on the percent of individuals who resist arrest is also needed to draw conclusions about police bias. That data was available for Texas and California. Researchers were able to analyze this data to determine that there was shooting bias in California but not in Texas.

== Number of deaths ==
=== Problems with police reporting practices ===
Departments can voluntarily include justifiable homicides in the crime statistics of the FBI's Uniform Crime Reports, which means that a lot of departments don't provide data at all. Some cities haven't reported their data in years. This means that the official data doesn't accurately reflect the number of civilians that are shot by the police.

Newspapers like The Guardian and The Washington Post have started compiling databases of fatal police shootings, revealing that in 2015 twice as many civilians had been fatally shot as the FBI's data suggested. An FBI working group has started working on a proposal for making the reports more accurate, but they would still rely on voluntary data and therefore wouldn't fix the main reporting issue.

=== Alternative database by The Guardian ===
The database developed by The Guardian is currently the largest database on fatal shootings available. They gather data through police reports, monitoring of regional news, fact-checked witness statements and other crowdsourced police fatality databases.

=== Number of deaths ===
In 2016, The Guardian counted 1093 people who were killed by the police in the United States. Out of these, 574 were white and 266 were black. 95 of the white victims were unarmed, while 42 of the black victims were unarmed.

More white than black people are shot. It is important to distinguish to differentiate between the number of deaths of an ethnic group and the likelihood of being shot by police. The likelihood of being shot as a black rather than a white person is higher, whether the victim is armed or not.

== Likelihood of being shot with respect to race ==
=== Observational studies ===
A 2015 study carried out at the University of California found "evidence of a significant bias in the killing of unarmed black Americans compared to unarmed white Americans". In this study, the probability of being shot by the police as a black, unarmed person versus as a white, unarmed person was 3.49 times higher. Unarmed Hispanics' likelihood to be shot was 1.67 times higher than for unarmed Whites. Black people have been 28% of those killed by police since 2013 despite being only 13% of the population.

On the other hand a 2016–2018 study by the National Bureau of Economic Research (NBER) of twenty-first century data recorded by 12 police departments across the U.S., which took into account various factors such as type of confrontation, whether the suspect was armed or not, and whether or not they drew a gun, found that while overall "blacks are 21 percent more likely than whites to be involved in an interaction with police in which at least a weapon is drawn" and that in the raw data from New York City's Stop and Frisk program "blacks and Hispanics are more than fifty percent more likely to have an interaction with police which involves any use of force" after "[p]artitioning the data in myriad ways, we find no evidence of racial discrimination in officer-involved shootings." The study did find bias against blacks and Hispanics in non-lethal and less-extreme lethal violence, stating that "as the intensity of force increases (e.g. handcuffing civilians without arrest, drawing or pointing a weapon, or using pepper spray or a baton), the probability that any civilian is subjected to such treatment is small, but the racial difference remains surprisingly constant", and noted that "[u]ntil recently, data on officer-involved shootings were extremely rare and contained little information on the details surrounding an incident".

After the NBER study was published in the peer-reviewed Journal of Political Economy, a comment on it by Steven Durlauf and (Nobel Memorial Prize in Economics recipient) James Heckman of the Harris School of Public Policy Studies at the University of Chicago stated, "[i]n our judgment, this paper does not establish credible evidence on the presence or absence of discrimination against African Americans in police shootings." The NBER study's author, Roland G. Fryer Jr., responded by saying Durlauf and Heckman erroneously claim that his sample is "based on stops". Further, he states that the "vast majority of the data...is gleaned from 911 calls for service in which a civilian requests police presence."

A 2018 study in the journal Social Psychological and Personality Science sought to "argue for more reasonable benchmarks to compare fatal shooting rates across racial groups" than "comparing the group's raw shooting numbers against each group's overall representation in the population". On the premise that "the more [racial] group members are involved in criminal activity, the more exposure they have to situations in which police shootings would be likely to occur" the authors analyzed The Guardian's database through their own measurements of each race's involvement in criminal activity, calculated from the Federal Bureau of Investigation's Summary Reporting System (SRS) and National Incident-Based Reporting System (NIBRS), the National Crime Victimization Survey (NCVS), and the Centers for Disease Control and Prevention's WONDER database. Once the data were weighted by these measurements, the authors were able to conclude that, for example, although "[o]dds were 3.7 times higher for Blacks relative to Whites to be fatally shot given population proportions" while holding or reaching for a harmless object, this was appropriate given higher rates of average criminal involvement among blacks. They propose, "[i]f officers are more likely to misidentify a harmless object in the hands of a Black citizen due to stereotypes, the cause of officers holding those stereotypes may rest with (the very small percentage of) those who are more likely to engage in criminal activity."

A more recent study was conducted by Michigan State University and the University of Maryland, compiling a list of more than 900 fatal U.S. police shootings in 2015 using crowdsourced databases from The Washington Post and The Guardian.RETRACTED: Officer characteristics and racial disparities in fatal officer-involved shootings Then, they asked police departments for information about the race of the officers responsible for the shootings. They found black police were more likely to kill black civilians than white civilians. However, the same held true for white and Hispanic officers: Each group of police was more likely to shoot civilians of their own race. Researchers claimed this is true because police tend to be drawn from the communities they work in and are thus more likely to have deadly encounters with civilians of the same race. They conclude that "increasing diversity among officers by itself is unlikely to reduce racial disparity in police shootings".

=== Experimental studies ===
Several experimental studies by social psychologists, in which college students are tested playing computer game simulations, have uncovered racial bias in their decisions to shoot. A computer game simulation experiment in 2010 that tested college students, community members, and police officers found that racial bias was moderated by "prototypicality", i.e. they were more likely to shoot if a person had stronger features generally associated with black people (broader nose, large lips, etc.) regardless of the suspects actual racial category/skin colour, to the extent that white suspects with strong "black features" suffered more negative bias than black suspects with strong "white features". Furthermore they found greater racial bias among college students and community members than police officers (who are trained to overcome racial bias), and on average could not find racial bias among the police officers tested (although there was prototypicality bias).

== Factors that influence decision to shoot ==
=== List of empirically researched factors ===
Empirical research suggests the following factors to influence the decision to shoot:

- Implicit racial bias, prejudice, and stereotypes
- Status armed/unarmed
- Whether or not the police officer was threatened or attacked
- Gender (men are more likely to be shot)
- County
- Income and status of the neighbourhood
- Previous experiences of the police officers with the ethnic group
- Previous experiences of the victim with the police
- Emotional facial expression of the civilian
- Fatigue of the police officer

==== Implicit racial bias ====
An implicit racial bias refers to unintentional judgments a person makes of a group (e.g. good/bad) of a certain ethnicity. Therefore, a person who shows implicit racial bias might not be aware of it. Police officers have been found to show a racial bias against black people in the decision to shoot, and implicit biases are directly correlated with shooting behavior.

In one of the studies, researchers investigated how stereotypes affected police officers' decisions to shoot. They used a video game and exposed their participants to pictures of either Whites or Non-Whites who were armed or unarmed. During this video game, the participants were asked to choose between "shoot" or "don't shoot" as quickly as possible. The results were that the participants shot armed black people faster than armed white people and chose "don't shoot" faster for unarmed white than unarmed black persons.

The authors explained those findings by the activation of stereotype thinking which lead white people to associate black people with danger. Because of this stereotype, the participants expected blacks to carry a gun and therefore were quicker to make the "shooting" decision. Other studies have found similar results. The time pressure to make a decision in decisions to shoot might magnify the effects of racial bias. However, more recent research indicates that despite scoring moderately high on an Implicit Association Test, police officers are less likely to shoot black people in a video simulation

==== Location and context ====
In the USA, police officers live and work in a society where prejudices against minorities are common. In addition, police officers usually deal with higher crime rates in minority neighborhoods. These experiences tend to reinforce existing prejudices, leading to discrimination against minorities. Other factors that lead to discrimination by police are language barriers between police and some ethnic groups, experiences with disrespectful or hostile residents in certain minority neighborhoods, and low punishment for police officers who misbehave towards minorities.

Due to these prejudices, minorities may develop hostile attitudes towards police and be more likely to behave disrespectfully or to insult officers. This may lead to a self-reinforcing cycle, where the biases of either group reinforce those of the other.

===== Examples that showcase prejudices among police officers include =====
- Disruptive actions by the police like stopping and questioning citizens on the street are more common in minority neighborhoods
- More cases of non-whites are dropped than those of whites. This may be because the reasons for arresting them were too weak or unjustified in the first place.

== Ways to reduce shooting bias ==
Possibly the biggest change could be made by holding police officers accountable for their actions. Internal investigations have been criticized for bias in favor of officers, leading to a lack of punishment. The work culture within some police departments has been criticized as racist, in light of many recent scandals.

Research findings indicate that explicit biases play a significant role in deliberative decision-making processes, such as evaluating evidence in complex situations. Individuals with stronger explicit biases are more likely to judge white offenders as "not guilty."

The Impact of Bias on Courtroom Decisions

In the United States, such biases could result in white defendants, particularly police officers involved in cases with Black victims, being acquitted more frequently, even when evidence points to their guilt. This highlights the need to raise awareness among jurors and other decision-makers in court proceedings about the influence of preconceived notions and to implement measures that promote objective evidence evaluation.

Addressing Factors That Influence Shooting Bias

Knowing the factors that influence police officers decisions to shoot there are a few possible solutions for reducing shooting bias. The main factor is implicit racial bias, which in turn becomes augmented or intensified by certain factors that could be addressed.

Reducing Fatigue to Reduce Racial Bias

Diversity in police departments might not reduce shooting bias, but reducing fatigue might lower the impact of racial bias on the decision to shoot. Changing the training of police officers so as to not showcase black armed targets more often than white ones could help reduce racial bias.

Stress Training and Community Familiarity

Training police officers in making decisions under stress as well as assigning officers to certain locations so they can become familiar with its residents could reduce the numbers of civilians killed, says Richmond's police chief, Chris Magnus.

Awareness Training

Racial bias can be contagious within a social group or neighborhood. Training police officers to be aware of this might help in reducing this effect.

== See also ==
- List of unarmed African Americans killed by law enforcement officers in the United States
