= Pano Kanelos =

American academic administrator

Chancellor of University of Austin
- Incumbent
- Assumed office 2025

1st President of University of Austin
- In office 2021–2025
- Succeeded by: Carlos M. Carvalho

24th President of St. John's College - Annapolis
- In office 2017–2021
- Preceded by: Christopher B. Nelson
- Succeeded by: Nora Demleitner

Personal details
- Spouse: Christina Kanelos
- Children: 2
- Education: Northwestern University (BA); Boston University (MA); University of Chicago (PhD)
- Occupation: Chancellor

Peter "Panayiotis" Kanelos is an American academic who is a prominent Shakespeare scholar, was the founding president of the University of Austin, and was the university's chancellor until October 2025. From 2017 to 2021, he was the 24th president of St. John's College, Annapolis. He also was one of the earliest contributors to the Teach For America program, and previously administered the Lilly Fellows Program in Humanities and the Arts, which program includes participation through over 100 colleges and universities to provide graduate education support for accepted students interested in becoming teacher-scholars.

Kanelos was born in a Greek-American family and was the first in his family to attend college. After graduating from a Jesuit high school in Arizona, he earned a B.A. in English from Northwestern University, an M.A. in political philosophy and literature from Boston University, and a Ph.D. from the University of Chicago. He was a postdoctoral fellow and faculty member at Stanford University.
