= Airbyte =

Open-source data integration platform

Airbyte is an open-source data integration platform that allows organizations to recompile and synchronize multi-source data in places such as data warehouses, data lakes or databases. Founded in 2020 with investments in San Francisco, California, the company offers multiple implementation offers, including cloud integration, local, and hybrid integration of data.

== History ==
Airbyte was founded January 2020 in San Francisco by Michel Tricot and John Lafleur.

In March 2021, Accel led an initial investment of $5.2M in Airbyte.

In May 2021, the company announced $26M from a "Series A" round led by Benchmark, with 8VC, Accel, SV Angel, and Y Combinator as participants. The platform then offered 70 certified connectors and contacted approximately 1,200 community members.

In December 2021, Airbyte earned $150 from a "Series B" rounds, funded by Altimeter Capital and Coatue Management, attaining a valuation of $1.5B and "unicorn status."

In April 2022, Airbyte acquired Grouparoo, an open-source inverse-ETL startup. Airbyte also announced Airbyte Cloud, a version integrated and totally data-integration platform-administrated.

In September 2024, the company launched Aribyte 1.0, introducing connector Generative AI, supported by GraphQL and auto-generated enterprise capacities. Airbyte then reported to have 7,000 enterprise clients and more than 170,000 platform implementations.

In February 2026, they transition their primary platform to emphasize their primarily capacity-based volume pricing system for open-source data movement.

In. September 2025, Airbyte launched Version 2.0, introducing Enterprise Flex, allowing for hybrid implementations, Data Activation, and user information-transfer to commercial tools.

== Membership ==
As of 2025, the Airbyte's open-source community has more than 25,000 members and more than 7,000 paying members.

== See Also ==
- Extract, transform, load (ETL)
