= Ferric Fang =

American microbiologist

Ferric C. Fang is an American microbiologist. He is a Professor of Laboratory Medicine, Pathology, and Microbiology at the University of Washington School of Medicine, as well as the director of the Harborview Medical Center's Clinical Microbiology Laboratory. Prior to joining the University of Washington in 2001, he taught at the University of Colorado School of Medicine. From 2007 to 2017, he was the editor-in-chief of Infection and Immunity, and he was the deputy editor of Clinical Infectious Diseases from 2016 to 2021. Most recently, he served as an editor of Clinical Microbiology Reviews from 2021 to 2025. He has been a member of the American Society for Clinical Investigation since 1998, as well as an elected Fellow of the American Academy of Microbiology and the American Association for the Advancement of Science.

== Biography ==
Fang grew up in Los Angeles, California, the son of a doctor. He attended Harvard University, where he received his A.B. in biology in 1979; he went on to receive his M.D. from Harvard Medical School in 1983.

== Research ==
Fang's research interests include studying the antimicrobial activity of reactive nitrogen and oxygen species against Salmonella enterica and Staphylococcus aureus. His laboratory also discovered the process of xenogeneic silencing, whereby bacteria incorporate foreign DNA into regulatory pathways. He became interested in studying scientific retractions after he retracted six papers that had been published in Infection and Immunity. He subsequently began studying the subject in more detail with another of the journal's editors, Arturo Casadevall. They published a paper on the subject in 2011, in which they coined the term "retraction index". He has also catalogued the incidence of scientific fraud, and published a study in 2012 finding that such fraud has become increasingly common in recent years. In 2014, he co-authored another study showing that every paper retracted because of scientific misconduct costs the National Institutes of Health about $400,000 on average. In 2023, he and Casadevall published "Thinking About Science: Good Science, Bad Science, and How to Make It Better" (ASM/Wiley), a collection of essays.
