= Versive =

- Type: Private
- Industry: Machine Learning
- Founded: Seattle, United States (2012)
- Founders: Chris Metcalfe; Stephen Purpura
- Headquarters: Wells Fargo Center, 999 3rd Ave #2100, Seattle, WA 98104, United States
- Area served: Worldwide
- Key people: Joe Polverari (CEO); Art Munson; Dustin Hillard
- Products: Versive Security Engine, Versive Machine Learning Platform
- Number of employees: 50
- Website: www.versive.com

Versive was a machine learning startup based in Seattle, Washington, US. Founded in 2012 by Stephen Purpura and Chris Metcalfe, the company sells on-premises software, cloud services, and professional service solutions to help businesses automate human expertise.

As of September 2014, Versive has raised $42 million in total investment. The company changed its name from Context Relevant to Versive in 2017. In October 2018, Versive was acquired by eSentire.

== Product ==
Versive has developed a platform that ingests data, determines what's important, and creates a problem-specific solution that can be deployed while continually learning. The proprietary high-performance machine learning technology accelerates deployment of machine learning solutions.

Problem-specific applications provide an experience that reduces the workload on users building complicated models. Deployment options include public or private clouds, traditional servers, and Hadoop clusters.

Versive's software has been applied in various industries. The information gathered through the technology aims to help clients predict activity based on observed trends. The technology can be used to help security teams detect advanced cyber threats, and won the Best Emerging Security Product at Interop in May 2017. It is useful for calculating prices and other risks. The system can also detect fraud.

== Investment history ==
Versive launched with $1.3 million in seed funding from Madrona Venture Group and Seattle-based angel investor Geoff Entress. Other initial investors included Mike McSherry, Cliff Kushler, and Mark Illing of Swype/Nuance. The startup received an additional $1.5 million in funding from Madrona in November 2012. In July 2013, Versive raised a total of $7 million in a round of series A funding. The round included previous investors such as Madrona and Entress, as well as Vulcan Capital and Bloomberg Beta.

In May, June, and September 2014, Versive raised an additional $35 million in total investment in three chunks from Goldman Sachs, Bank of America Merrill Lynch, Bloomberg Beta, New York Life, Formation 8, Madrona, Work-Bench, and Seattle angel investors.

== Partners ==
Versive has partnered with Good Harbor Security Risk Management, a company founded by Richard A. Clarke, a counterterrorism expert and former cyber-security adviser under the Bush administration. Clarke sits on Versive's advisory board and, through his company, helps Versive to repair security breaches and ensure security compliance, among other services.

== Awards and recognition ==
In May 2014, Versive was named to DataBeat's Innovation Showdown.

In April 2014, Versive was nominated for Pacific Northwest Startup of the Year by GeekWire.

In November 2013, Versive was selected by GeekWire in collaboration with the Museum of History & Industry (MOHAI) and the Bezos Center for Innovation as one of the Seattle 10. This recognizes the most promising young start-up companies within the Seattle region. Context Relevant, along with the nine other companies, was recognized at the GeekWire Gala on 4 December 2013 where they also unveiled a sketch of their business concept on giant-sized cocktail napkins.
