= Vadim Moshkovich =

Russian billionaire and philanthropist

- Вадим Мошкович
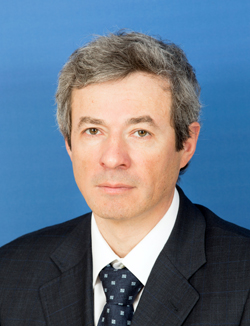
- Moshkovich in 2013
- Born: April 6, 1967 (age 59); Moscow, USSR
- Citizenship: Cyprus and Russian
- Education: MIREA – Russian Technological University
- Occupations: Businessperson, politician
- Organization: Rusagro Group
- Known for: Chairman of the board of directors

Vadim Nikolaevich Moshkovich (Russian: Вадим Николаевич Мошкович; born 6 April 1967) is a Cypriot-Russian billionaire businessman. His business interests include major investments in agriculture and real estate development. In 2014, Forbes magazine put his net worth at $1.3bn, 81st place among Russian businesspeople.

== Early life and family ==
Vadim Moshkovich was born to a Jewish family in Moscow in 1967. He attended mathematical school No.57 in Moscow, and graduated from the Moscow State Institute of Radio Engineering, Electronics and Automation in 1992. He is married and has three children.

== Business career ==
=== Agriculture ===
Moshkovich entered the agricultural business in 1995, beginning with sugar imports. From 1997 to 2003 he began acquiring sugar processing plants, and in 2004 he established Rusagro Group. The company grew to become one of the largest vertically integrated agricultural holdings in Russia, working in four business segments: In 2011, Rosagro Plc. (main holding company of the Rusagro Group) conducted an IPO on the London Stock Exchange, raising approximately $300 million. Moshkovich currently holds a 75% stake in the company.

=== Real estate development ===
Moshkovich controls Masshtab, one of the largest Russian development companies, focused on New Moscow (Novaya Moskva), an area which was absorbed by the City of Moscow in July 2012. The company has more than 2,580 hectares in New Moscow. Upon entering the real estate sector, Mashtab hired McKinsey & Company to study the world's most successful cities. These studies resulted in a development plan which, in a break with typical post-Soviet practice, aims to create an urban space that provides not only new residential blocks, but also ample social and transport infrastructure, and to facilitate local job creation in line with global best practice. Moshkovich cited the City of Irvine, California as an example of a well planned new city built on former agricultural land that continues to attract residents and create local jobs. In 2013, Moshkovich donated 307 hectares of land to the City of Moscow to be used for the construction of an administrative and government center in New Moscow.

== Sanctions by EU ==
On 10 March 2022, Moshkovich was sanctioned by the European Union.

== Political career ==
Moshkovich was a member of the Federation Council (Russia), the Upper Chamber of the Russian Parliament, representing the Belgorod Region of the Russian Federation. He is a member of the Federation Council's Committee on Economic Policy. His term at the Federation Council ended in October 2015.

== Fraud charges ==
In early 2025 Moshkovich was arrested and detained on charges of large-scale fraud.

Russian authorities seized approximately $7.6 billion (550 billion rubles) in assets linked to billionaire Rusagro founder Vadim Moshkovich in mid-2026, marking the country's largest asset confiscation in recent years. The high-profile takeover is part of a wider Kremlin campaign to bring private wealth under state control to fund wartime costs, causing deep anxiety and cash withdrawals among Russia's business elite and citizens.

== Philanthropic activities ==
Moshkovich funded a school for gifted children in Kommunarka (in Novomoskovsky Administrative Okrug). While tuition was set at $10,000 per year, 50% to 75% of students are receiving scholarships from the school. The school will aspire to place graduates at top 30 global universities. The cost of the project was $250 million.

Moshkovich is a donor and a member of the Board of Trustees of the National Research University – Higher School of Economics in Moscow, and of the Belgorod State Research University. He is also a donor and a member of the Board of Trustees of the Jewish Museum and Tolerance Center in Moscow.
