= UBiome =

American biotechnology company

uBiome, Inc.
- Type: Private
- Industry: Biotechnology
- Founded: 2012
- Founder: Zachary Apte, Jessica Richman
- Defunct: 2019
- Fate: Bankruptcy in 2019 after federal fraud charges in 2021. Founders are FBI fugitives.
- Headquarters: San Francisco, California, United States
- Products: SmartGut; SmartJane; Explorer
- Website: ubiome.com (archived link)

uBiome, Inc. was an American biotechnology company based in San Francisco that developed technology to sequence the human microbiome. Founded in 2012, the company filed for bankruptcy in 2019 following an FBI raid in an investigation over possible insurance fraud involving the US health insurance program Medicare.

In 2021, the Securities and Exchange Commission charged two of the cofounders (Jessica Richman and Zachary Apte) with defrauding investors. The couple were also charged with federal crimes including conspiracy to commit fraud and money laundering. Since 2021, the FBI has considered the founders to be fugitives.

== History ==
=== Founding ===
The company was founded by Jessica Richman, Zachary Apte, and Will Ludington who were scientists in the California Institute for Quantitative Biosciences. In November 2012, uBiome generated $350,000 through a crowdfunding campaign. The founders received mentoring and funding from Y Combinator and further funding from Andreessen Horowitz and 8VC.

Jessica Richman was also found to have lied about her age to get on tech lists such as Forbes 30 under 30. She was in her forties at the time.

=== Insurance fraud investigation and liquidation ===
In April 2019, FBI agents raided the uBiome office in an investigation over possible insurance fraud involving the US health insurance program Medicare. According to company insiders, the company often repeatedly billed patients without their consent and pressured doctors to approve tests.

Cofounders Apte and Richman were put on administrative leave pending an investigation by the company's board.

The company filed for Chapter 11 bankruptcy (reorganization of debt) in September 2019, amidst the investigation, and less than a month later it filed for a Chapter 7 bankruptcy (liquidation) and shut down.

In 2021, the Securities and Exchange Commission charged two of the cofounders (Richman and Apte) with defrauding investors. The couple were also charged with federal crimes including conspiracy to commit fraud and money laundering. Richman and Apte married in 2019 and relocated to Germany in June 2020. Since 2021, the FBI has considered them to be fugitives.

=== Products and services ===
Customers purchased kits to sample one or more parts of their body, including the gut, genitals, mouth, nose, or skin. After swabbing, a participant took a survey which was used to make correlations with microbiome data. The participant sent the kit to the company in the mail and received data in a few weeks; they could compare their data with that of uBiome's data set. In 2015 uBiome received Clinical Laboratory Improvement Amendments (CLIA) certification from the State of California. In 2016, uBiome received accreditation from the College of American Pathologists.

=== Technology ===
As of 2015, the company first amplified a portion of the bacterial gene that encodes 16S ribosomal RNA using PCR, then sequenced the amplified 16S ribosomal RNA gene, in order to categorize the bacteria at the genus level. The company had proprietary machine learning algorithms that analyzed the sequence data and compared it with the company's proprietary database of microbiomes, built from the samples that partners and single customers sent to them, and web-based software that allowed individuals to view their microbiome and make certain comparisons. A 2014 report in Xconomy said the company outsourced the sequencing. The sequencing was done on the Illumina NextSeq500 sequencer.

In October 2015, the company introduced an app on iOS using ResearchKit that allowed customers to view their results on mobile devices.

uBiome has been compared with Theranos and 23andMe, each of which also failed as a controversial biotechnology company influenced by Silicon Valley.

=== Citizen science ===
Amy Dockser Marcus noted in a 2014 essay in The Wall Street Journal that when uBiome raised its initial round of crowdfunding in early 2013, many questions were raised by bioethicists about the company's citizen science business model – namely whether it had actually obtained informed consent from its customers, and whether direct to consumer genetic testing initiatives could be ethically conducted at all, and its lack of institutional review board (IRB) approval. The Wall Street Journal essay also noted that questions were raised about the quality of data obtained in citizen-science initiatives, with regard to self-selection and other issues.

The company obtained an institutional review board approval in July 2013.

In 2014, people experienced in biotechnology entrepreneurship also raised questions about the ethics of crowdfunding a biotech company, as the risks of such ventures are high even for people with scientific and business sophistication.

As of 2015, uBiome offered a $1 million grant program to researchers and citizen scientists for microbiome sampling and related analysis. One winner of the first round of such grants was the Centers for Disease Control and Prevention.

== Awards and recognition ==
In March 2018, uBiome made Fast Company's list for The World's Most Innovative Companies in Data Science, acknowledging uBiome's work collecting data to develop tests for HPV and STIs.

== See also ==
- Personal genomics
- Genealogical DNA test
- Citizen science
