= Brecher =

Brecher or Bröcher is a surname. Notable people with the surname include:

- Amaya Brecher, cast member of The Real World: Hawaii
- Aviva Brecher (born 1945), American applied physicist and transportation scientist
- Bob Brecher (born 1949), British philosopher
- Daniel Cil Brecher (born 1951), Israeli historian and author
- Edward M. Brecher (1912–1989), American author
- Egon Brecher (1880–1946), Austro-Hungarian actor and director
- Gary Brecher (born July 1955), American military writer
- Gideon Brecher (1797–1873), Jewish Bohemian-Austrian physician and writer
- Gustav Brecher (1879–1940), Jewish Bohemian-German conductor and composer
- Irving Brecher (1914–2008), American screenwriter
- Jeremy Brecher, historian, documentary filmmaker, activist, and author
- John Brecher, wine columnist of The Wall Street Journal
- Mark Elliott Brecher (born 1956), Retired Chief Medical Officer LabCorp, Emeritus Professor University of North Carolina
- Michael Brecher (1925–2022), Canadian academic in political science
- Steve Brecher (born 1945), American professional poker player

== See also ==
- 4242 Brecher, asteroid
- Brecker
