= William D. Young (engineer) =

American pharmaceutical industry executives

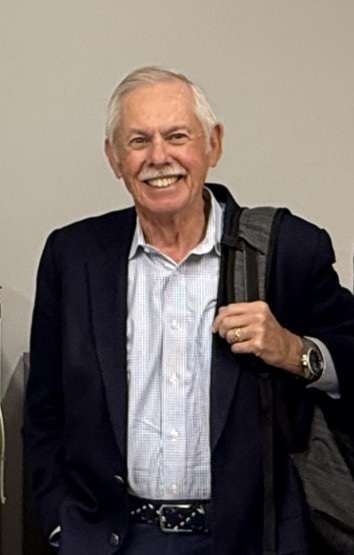
- Bill Young in 2025
- Education: Purdue University, Indiana University
- Scientific career
- Fields: Biotechnology
- Workplaces: Eli Lilly and Company, Genentech, Monogram Biosciences

William D. Young is an American chemical engineer and pharmaceutical industry executive known for his contributions to enable industrial-scale manufacturing of recombinant proteins starting with Humulin. He is a senior advisor at Blackstone Life Sciences, a division of the global investment firm Blackstone Inc. focused on advancing innovative medicines and technologies.

== Early life and education ==
Bill Young was born in Wilkes-Barre, PA to Bill Young Sr, a Scottish immigrant, and Ruth Ringmacher. His father died when Young was four years old after which his mother moved to relatives in Louisville, KY, where Young grew up. Young earned a bachelor’s degree in chemical engineering from Purdue University College of Engineering in 1966. He went on to get an MBA from Indiana University in 1971. Young met his wife Sherry, a Canadian living in Puerto Rico, when working for Eli Lilly and Company in San Juan.

== Career ==
After graduating from Purdue in 1966, Young joined Eli Lilly and Company in Indianapolis as an entry-level engineer in the group working on injectable drugs. His mentor at Eli Lilly was Sam McCormick, the first chemical engineer hired by the company who led its department of biochemical engineering since 1957. At Lilly, Young helped planning and startup of its new antibiotics manufacturing facility and from 1975 moved to Puerto Rico to lead biochemical manufacturing development for the company's first plant in Puerto Rico. In 1978, Young moved back to Indianapolis to join the company's collaboration with a biotechnology startup Genentech working on human insulin production based on recombinant DNA technology.

In 1980, Young was recruited by Robert A. Swanson to join Genentech as its first director of manufacturing. Young became the Chief Operating Officer and oversaw the company’s development, operations, and commercial functions during a formative period in the biotechnology industry.

Young has held several prominent roles throughout his career. He was Chairman of the Board of Biogen Inc. (NASDAQ: BIIB), a major biotechnology company specializing in neurological and autoimmune disorders. Prior to that, he was Chief Executive Officer of Monogram Biosciences, a company recognized for its contributions to personalized medicine. He led Monogram from 1999 until its acquisition by LabCorp in 2009.

== Honors ==
In 1993, he was elected to the National Academy of Engineering in recognition of his "leadership in research, development and manufacturing of recombinant proteins using recombinant DNA technology". Young was awarded an Honorary Doctorate in Engineering from Purdue University in 2000. In 2022, Purdue University established William D. and Sherry L. Young Institute for Advanced Manufacturing of Pharmaceuticals with a goal of "reducing costs and expanding access to innovative drugs emerging from biotechnology research".

== Public engagement ==
In May 2025, Young participated in the “Making Medicines in America” summit on Capitol Hill, organized by the Information Technology and Innovation Foundation (ITIF), Purdue University, and the National Institute for Pharmaceutical Technology and Education (NIPTE). The event focused on onshoring pharmaceutical manufacturing, strengthening the U.S. pharmaceutical supply chain and promoting AI-driven innovation in drug manufacturing. Young was featured as a panelist alongside other participants such as US Senator Todd Young and Eli Lilly and Company CEO David A. Ricks.
