= Exact Sciences Corporation =

American company in Madison, Wisconsin

Exact Sciences Corp.

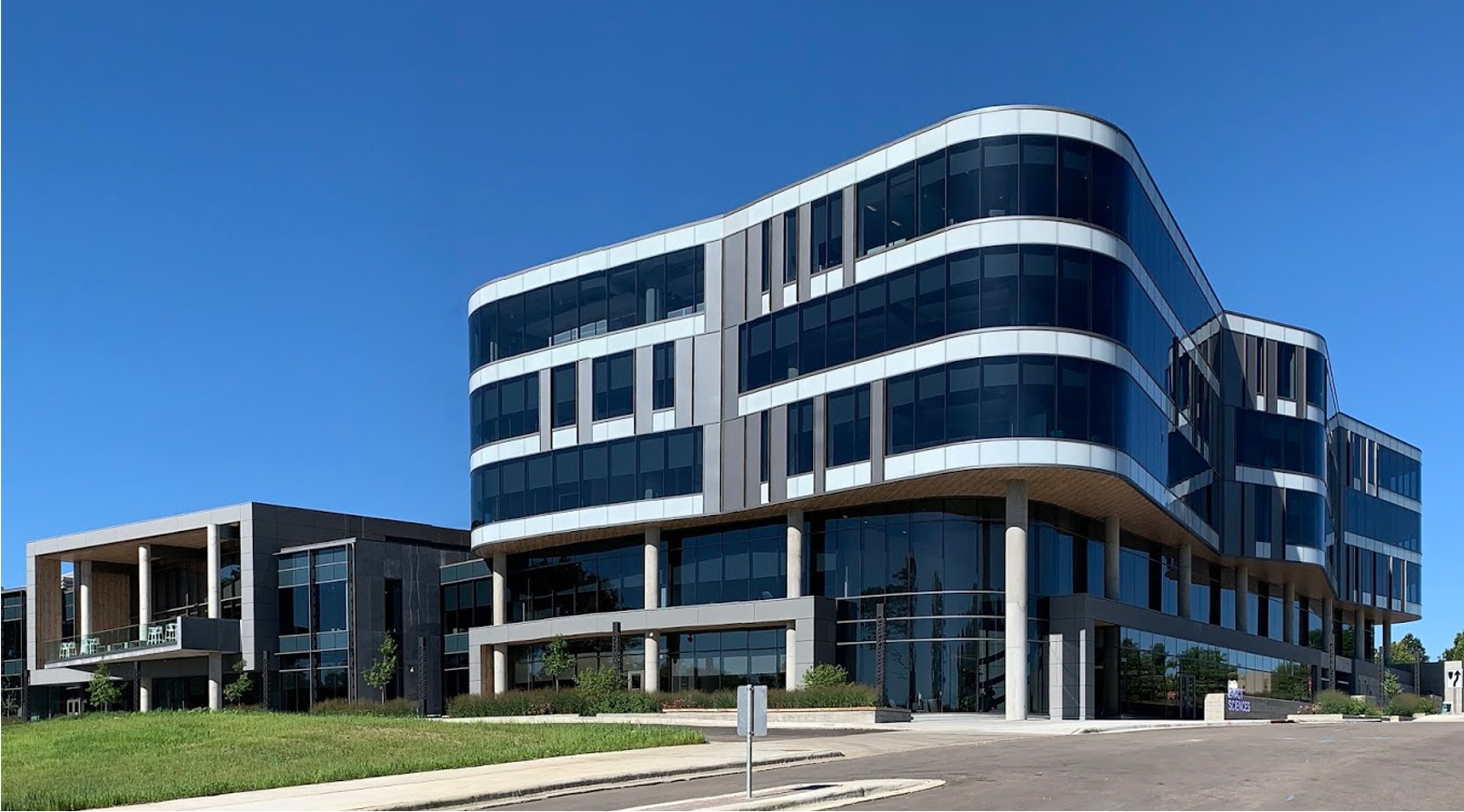
- Innovation One, the headquarters of Exact Sciences in Madison, Wisconsin (2020).
- Type: Subsidiary
- Traded as: Nasdaq: EXAS
- Industry: Molecular diagnostics
- Founded: 1995; 31 years ago in Marlborough, Massachusetts
- Founders: Stanley Lapidus; Anthony P. Shuber
- Headquarters: Madison, Wisconsin, U.S.
- Key people: Kevin Conroy (chairman, president & CEO); Jorge Garces (CSO)
- Products: Cologuard, Oncotype DX, Oncotype MAP
- Revenue: ▲US$2.50 billion (2023)
- Operating income: ▲US$−215 million (2023)
- Net income: ▲US$−204 million (2023)
- Total assets: ▲US$6.47 billion (2023)
- Total equity: ▲US$3.15 billion (2023)
- Number of employees: 6,500 (Dec 2023)
- Parent: Abbott Laboratories
- Subsidiaries: Subsidiary List: Biomatrica; Exact Sciences Development; Exact Sciences Innovation; Exact Sciences International; Exact Sciences Laboratories; Exact Sciences Thrive; Genomic Health; Paradigm Diagnostics; Prevention Genetics
- Website: exactsciences.com

Exact Sciences Corporation is an American molecular diagnostics company based in Madison, Wisconsin, specializing in the detection of early-stage cancers. It provides products for the detection and prevention of colorectal cancer, including Cologuard, the first stool DNA test for colorectal cancer, along with additional screening and precision oncological tests for other types of cancer.

In November 2025, Abbott Laboratories announced an agreement to acquire Exact Sciences in a deal worth roughly $21 billion. Following the completion of the acquisition in March 2026, the firm became a subsidiary of Abbott.

== History ==
Exact Sciences was founded in 1995 in Marlborough, Massachusetts, by Stanley Lapidus and Anthony Shuber as a company focused on the development of a non-invasive test for colorectal cancer. The company eventually went public with an initial offering on the NASDAQ in 2001. In the early years, there was much speculation that the company would be acquired by a competitor or exit the market; during this time the company's share price fell to less than one dollar.

A significant turnaround in the company's fortunes began with the announcement of a mutual collaboration and licensing agreement between Exact Sciences and the Mayo Clinic in June 2009. In the same year, the company appointed Kevin Conroy as CEO & president and moved its head office to Madison, Wisconsin.

In August 2014, Exact Sciences received premarket approval from the Food and Drug Administration for the use and marketing of its flagship product, Cologuard. This breakthrough heralded the beginning of a period of rapid growth for Exact Sciences and the start of its first foray into the acquisitions market.

In August 2017, the company made its first major acquisition when it purchased Sampleminded, a healthcare information technology company based in Salt Lake City, Utah, for $3.2 million. This was followed by the January 2018 announcement that Exact Sciences had completed a $690 million convertible bond offering and the revelation that the company was to acquire Armune Bioscience, a cancer diagnostic developer based in Kalamazoo and Ann Arbor, Michigan (announced during that year's J.P Morgan Healthcare Conference). Third-quarter financial reports revealed the price of the Armune Bioscience acquisition to be valued at $12 million, plus $17.5 million in incentives for certain milestones. Later, in October 2018, Exact Sciences announced its purchase of Biomatrica, a developer of sample preservation technology based in San Diego, California.

In summer 2019, Exact Sciences opened a new 169,000 square feet lab and warehouse facility to expand its testing capacity for Cologuard and, in its largest acquisition yet, announced its intention to buy Genomic Health, a genetic cancer detection company based in Redwood City, California, for $2.8 billion. The reason given for this latest acquisition was to both expand Exact Sciences' product portfolio through the addition of Genomic Health's OncotypeIQ suite of precision tests, and expand into other markets outside the US on the back of Genomic Health's existing network.

In March 2020, Exact Sciences purchased Paradigm Diagnostics and Viomics, two companies based in Phoenix, Arizona that would expand their lab testing and research and development capabilities. Later, in October 2020, the company again announced a round of acquisitions - this time of Thrive Earlier Detection Corp. (based in Cambridge, Massachusetts) and Base Genomics (based in Oxford, England), two companies specializing in one of Exact Sciences' pipeline areas - blood-based cancer screening.

Exact Sciences responded to the 2020 COVID-19 pandemic by temporarily refocusing a portion of its diagnostic capacity to testing for the disease. The company received FDA regulatory approval to provide home testing kits in April 2020, becoming one of the first companies in the U.S. to do so.

In early 2021, Exact Sciences announced its acquisition of Ashion Analytics and plans to collaborate in research with TGen, the City Of Hope's Genomics Institute. This news came shortly after the company's decision to purchase an exclusive-use license of TGen's proprietary liquid biopsy-based test technology, Tardis.

In November 2025, Abbott Laboratories announced and agreement to acquire Exact Sciences in a deal worth roughly $21 billion. Exact Science shareholders are expected to receive $105 per share and the deal was expected to close in Q2 2026.

=== Acquisition history ===
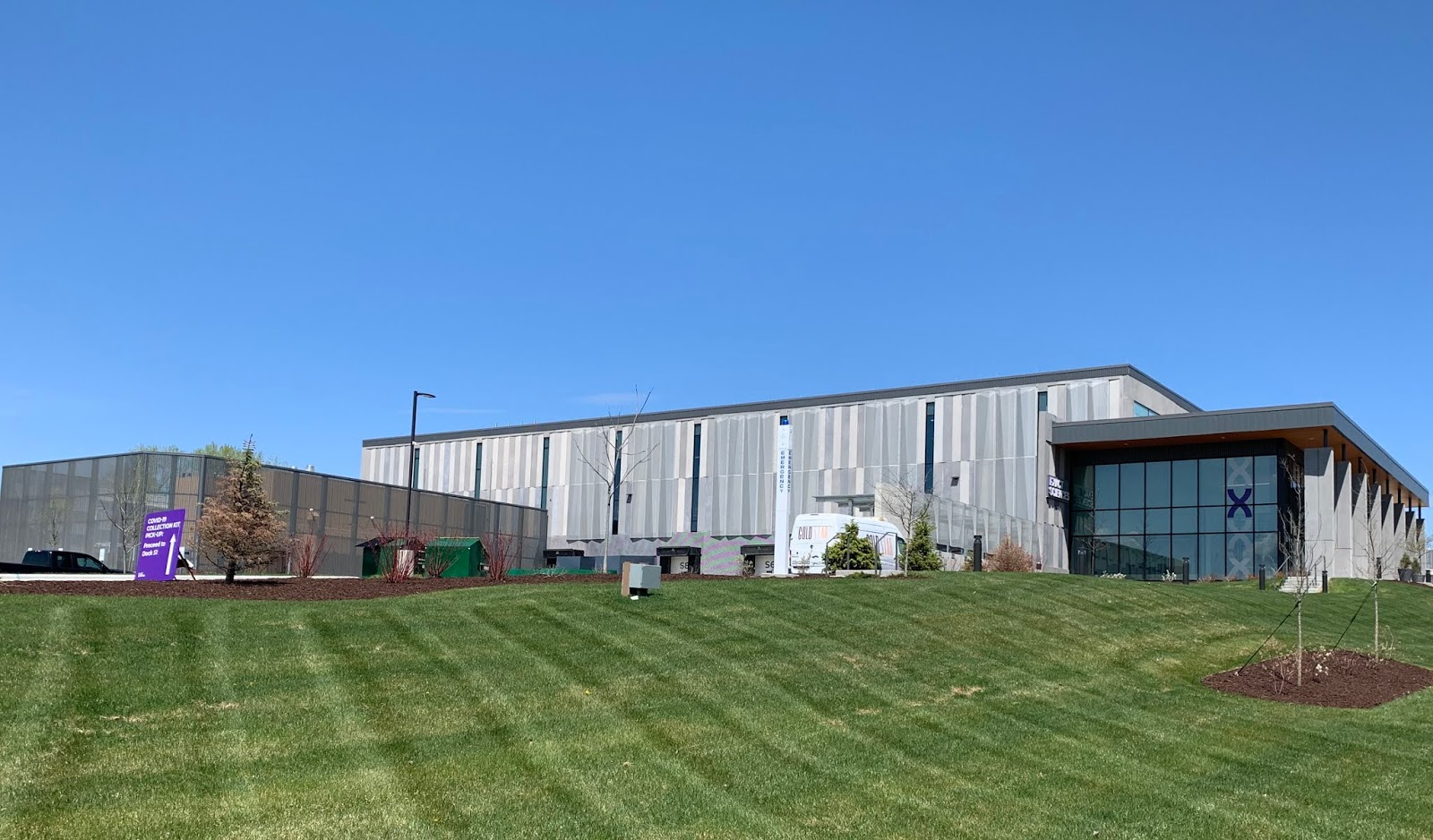
Exact Sciences' Cologuard screening laboratory and warehouse in Madison, Wisconsin.

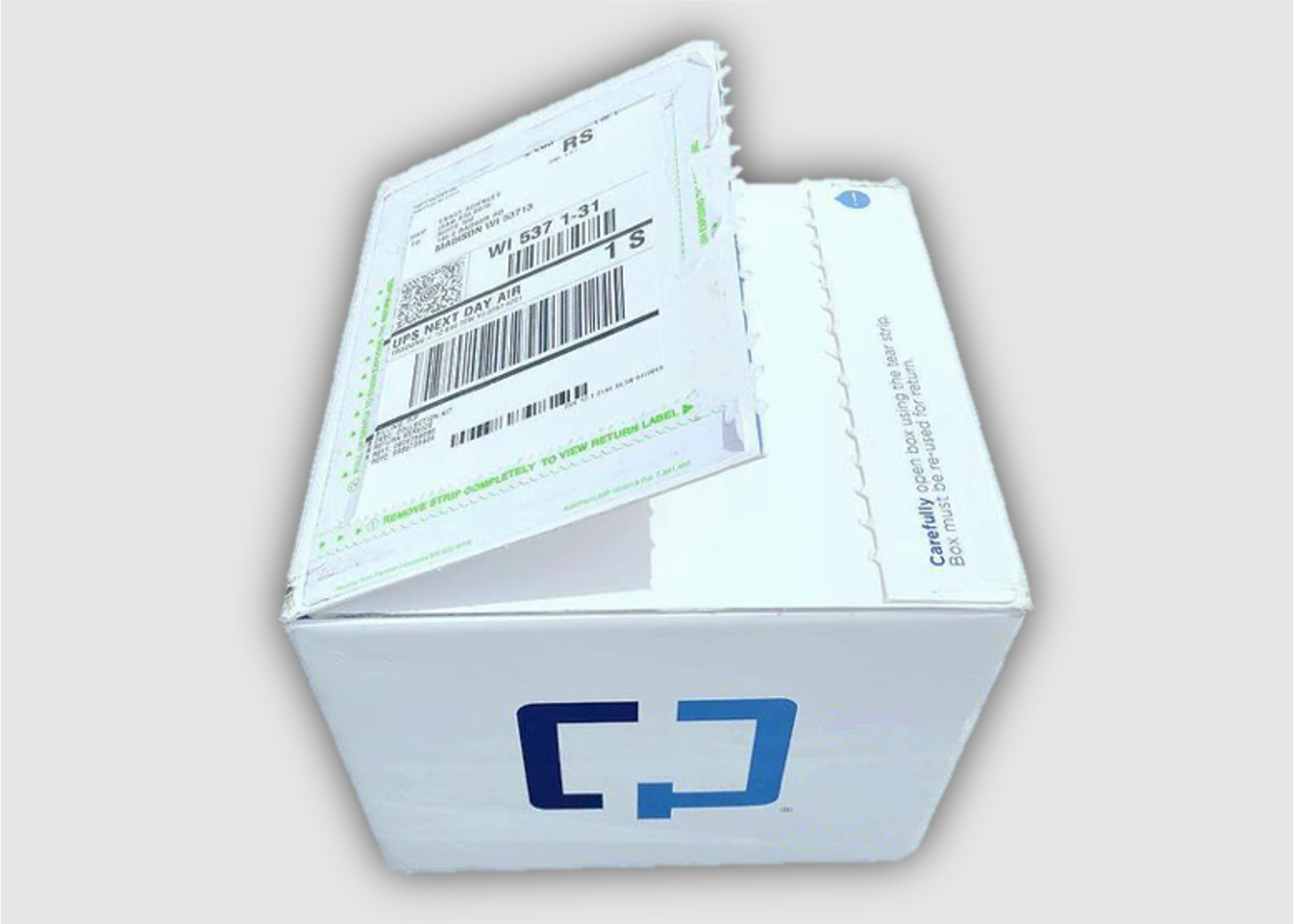
A Cologuard test package, ready for return to the lab using the pre-paid UPS shipping label.

The following is an illustration of the company's major mergers and acquisitions and historical predecessors (this is not a comprehensive list):

- Exact Sciences
  - - - - - - - - - Exact Sciences Corp.
                    (Founded 1995)
                - - Sampleminded
                    (Acq 2017)
              - - Armune Bioscience
                  (Acq 2018)
            - - Biomatrica
                (Acq 2018)
          - - Genomic Health
              (Acq 2019)
        - - Paradigm Diagnostics
            (Acq 2020)
      - - Viomics
          (Acq 2020)
    - - Thrive Earlier Detection Corp.
        (Acq 2020)
  - - Base Genomics
      (Acq 2020)

== Partnerships ==
Since 2009, Exact Sciences has maintained a collaboration with Mayo Clinic for its current and future products. In 2009, Exact Sciences also completed a licensing agreement with Hologic for its molecular detection platform. In April 2017, Exact Sciences and MDxHealth agreed to share technology on a variety of epigenetics and molecular diagnostics applications for five years. In August 2018, Exact Sciences and Pfizer announced an agreement through 2021 to co-promote Cologuard. In November 2018, Exact Sciences announced a partnership with Epic Systems for order entries.

== Products ==
Product type	Product	Cancer targeted	Purpose	Launch year	Availability	Additional information
Screening	Cologuard	Colorectal	Detection of colorectal neoplasia associated DNA markers and for the presence of occult hemoglobin in human stool	2014	US only	In August 2014, the U.S. Food and Drug Administration (FDA) approved the company's at-home multitarget stool DNA screening test called Cologuard, for the detection of colorectal cancers and pre-cancers. This test has a false positive rate of 13%.
Screening	Riskguard	Multiple	Detection of genetic mutations to assess hereditary cancer risk by means of a blood or saliva sample	2024	US only	Developed by and offered through Exact Sciences' subsidiary PreventionGenetics.
Screening	Oncoguard Liver	Liver	Blood-based Screening for common liver cancer in individuals suffering from cirrhosis or hepatitis B	2022	US only	
Precision Oncology	Oncotype DX Breast DCIS Score	Breast	Genomic testing of a patient’s risk for a local recurrence of ductal carcinoma in situ or progression to invasive carcinoma	2011	Over 90 countries	
Precision Oncology	Oncotype DX Breast Recurrence Score	Breast	Genome-based, comprehensive, individualized risk assessment for early-stage invasive breast cancer in adjuvant and neoadjuvant settings	2004	Over 90 countries	Since 2015 access to Oncotype DX Breast Recurrence Score testing has been available to all eligible NHS patients in England
Precision Oncology	Oncotype DX Colon Recurrence Score	Colorectal	Genome-based test to quantify the risk of recurrence of patients with anatomic stage II, MMR-P and stage III A/B colon cancers	2010	Over 90 countries	
Precision Oncology	OncoExTra	Multiple	Solid tumor profiling to aid therapy selection for patients with advanced, metastatic, refractory, relapsed, or recurrent cancer	2020	US only	

=== Pipeline ===
Product	Cancer targeted	Purpose	Launch year	Availability	Additional information
Cancerguard	Multiple	Early detection of cancerous cells through identification of tumor DNA circulating in the blood by means of a blood draw	Under development	Unknown	Initial development by Thrive Early Detection Corp.
Oncotype DX Breast Radiation Score	Breast	Genomic testing to establish the possible benefit a patient may expect from undergoing post-operative radiation therapy	Under development	Unknown	
Oncodetect	Multiple	Periodic monitoring of solid tumor DNA circulating in the blood to establish any ongoing presence of cancer post-treatment	Under development	Unknown	
Oncoliquid	Multiple	Blood test to provide therapy selection guidance in cases of advanced cancer	Under development	Unknown	

Pipeline products include esophageal, breast, lung, liver, and pancreatic cancer testing. The company is also working with the Mayo Clinic to identify biomarkers associated with the 15 deadliest cancers. Other initiatives focus on:

- Using experience gained from the development of Cologuard to create a wider cancer detection platform
- Expanding the range Oncotype IQ products to include liquid and tissue-based tests
- Adapting biomarker-based technologies create a liquid biopsy capable of detecting cancers and precancers from a blood sample
- Improving analytical sensitivity using the company's existing multi-marker approach to better identify cancerous samples

=== Former products ===
Product	Cancer targeted	Purpose	Launch year	Availability	Additional information
Oncotype DX AR-V7 Nucleus Detect	Prostate	Detection of acquired resistance to AR-targeted therapy via liquid biopsy assay that analyzes circulating tumor cells in a patient's blood	2018	US only	Developed by Epic Sciences and commercialized through a partnership with Exact Sciences in the United States.
Oncotype DX Genomic Prostate Score	Prostate	Genomic assay testing for men with clinically low- or intermediate-risk cancer to help make treatment decisions at the time of diagnosis	2013	Over 90 countries	
