= VLGC =

VLGC may refer to:

- Very Large Gas Carrier, a type of gas tanker used in shipping, see Gas carrier
- VLGC, the Nasdaq code for Virologic, a bioscience company
