= SCMM =

SCMM may refer to:

- Sequenom Center for Molecular Medicine, a division of Sequenom, a manufacturer of DNA massarrays.
- Southern California Medical Museum, in Pomona, California, United States.
