= Oncotype DX Colon Cancer Assay =

Genomic test for cancer recurrence

The Oncotype DX Colon Cancer Assay is a genomic test for patients with newly diagnosed stage II colon cancer, launched in January 2010 by Genomic Health. The test is a validated diagnostic assay based on an individual patient's colon tumor expression of 12 genes, which quantifies the likelihood of recurrence in stage II colon cancer following surgery. The result from the assay is a continuous recurrence score value from 0 to 100 that corresponds to a specific likelihood of colon cancer recurrence 3 years after surgery. A lower score corresponds to a lower risk of recurrence, and a higher score corresponds to a higher risk of recurrence. The Recurrence Score result provides additional information on recurrence risk beyond traditional clinical and pathological characteristics such as tumor stage (T-stage), mismatch repair (MMR) status, number of lymph nodes examined, tumor grade and lymphovascular invasion. The Oncotype DX Colon Cancer Assay has the greatest utility for the stage II colon cancer patients with T3 and MMR proficient tumors.

The Oncotype DX assay is a non-invasive test that is performed on a small amount of the tissue removed during surgery, which means no additional invasive procedure is required. After the surgical procedure, the tissue sample is fixed (usually in formalin) and embedded in paraffin so it can be preserved for diagnostic testing. To perform an Oncotype DX test, a pathologist will send the tumor block or several thin sections of the tissue sample to Genomic Health. Genomic Health uses a laboratory process known as RT-PCR to measure the expression of the 12-gene panel.

== Technical feasibility ==
Prior to selecting genes for the Oncotype DX Colon Cancer Assay, feasibility studies were conducted to optimize the Genomic Health platform for quantitative assessment of gene expression from fixed paraffin-embedded (FPE) colon tumor tissue. These studies in FPE colon tumor tissue identified (1) the optimal method for reliably extracting RNA and measuring gene expression by quantitative RT-PCR technology, (2) the requirement for review of each case by a pathologist for manual microdissection to remove normal colon tissue adjacent to the tumor, and (3) reference genes for normalization of gene expression. The use of carefully selected reference genes to normalize gene expression in the context of sources of pre-analytical variability such as time of fixation and block age is a critical feature of this technology. The findings from these feasibility studies provided the technical foundation for subsequent studies.

== Genes ==
To identify the genes for the Oncotype DX Colon Cancer Assay, four large, independent development studies were conducted which included patients treated with surgery alone and patients treated with surgery followed by adjuvant 5-FU/LV chemotherapy. Colon tumor samples from a total of 1,851 stage II and stage III colon cancer patients from the NSABP studies C-01/C-02, C-04, and C-06 and a cohort of patients treated at the Cleveland Clinic were utilized for identifying genes that were consistently associated with risk of recurrence. 761 candidate genes were studied in the NSABP C01/C02 (surgery alone) and NSABP C04 (surgery+5FU/LV) development studies. Based on the results of these studies, the gene list was refined to 375 genes, which were then studied in the Cleveland Clinic study (surgery alone) and NSABP C06 (surgery+5FU/LV). Of the initial large pool of candidate genes, 48 genes were found to have a consistent and statically significant association with recurrence-free interval in three of the four development studies. Importantly, the multiple large independent studies enabled identification of clinically relevant genes with confidence, with fewer than two of the 48 recurrence-associated genes expected to be false discoveries. The 7 cancer related genes are Ki-67, C-MYC, MYBL2, FAP, BGN, INHBA, and GADD45B.

== Development and validation ==
Analyses across these four development studies enabled the definition of a multi-gene assay for prediction of tumor recurrence in stage II colon cancer patients following surgery. Based on modeling and assessment of laboratory analytical performance, a 12-gene assay, including seven cancer-related genes and five reference genes, was defined, yielding a colon cancer Recurrence Score result, scaled from 0 to 100, based upon reference-normalized expression of the seven cancer-related genes.

The seven cancer-related genes include two key biologic pathways (cell cycle genes and stromal genes) associated with recurrence in the development studies, as well as an individual gene GADD45B (associated with cellular response to stress). Higher expression of the cell cycle group, including Ki67, is associated with better outcome in stage II colon cancer following surgery, and this result is consistent with reports in the literature, including studies by the NSABP. Cell cycle genes are well-known to produce various effects in different biological contexts, ranging from promotion of proliferation to induction of cell senescence or apoptosis. Higher expression of the stromal gene group is associated with poor outcome in colon cancer, which is consistent with observations in the literature that stromal genes are associated with induction of tumor cell proliferation, tumor invasion, and metastasis. The cell cycle gene group and the stromal gene group are included in the calculation of the Recurrence Score result as an average of the three genes in each group. GADD45B is an individual gene used for calculation of the Recurrence Score result and is known to be a marker of genotoxic stress which may be indicative of tumor-stroma interactions and thus more aggressive tumor behavior.

Following gene identification and algorithm development, a process for conducting the assay, including all steps from receipt of the tumor specimen to generation of the assay result, was finalized and analytically validated prior to conducting clinical validation studies. Analytical validation of Oncotype DX test ensures that the assay will give accurate, precise and reproducible results across different reagent lots, operators, and patient samples. Standardization of the assay is critical to ensuring that the Oncotype DX assay yields reliable results which clinicians can use to informing patient management treatment decisions.

== Clinical validation ==
=== QUASAR ===
Following development and analytical validation of the assay, a clinical validation study was conducted in a sample of 1,436 confirmed stage II colon cancer patients from the landmark QUASAR trial. The QUASAR trial is the largest reported randomized study of observation versus adjuvant chemotherapy in patients with resected stage II colon cancer, and demonstrated that adjuvant 5-FU/LV treatment benefits a small but significant population of stage II patients. This study demonstrated an approximate 3-4% absolute benefit of adjuvant 5-FU/LV treatment within the stage II population, which is consistent with meta-analyses of adjuvant 5FU/LV trials involving stage II patients.

In the pre-specified primary analysis for the QUASAR validation study, a Cox proportional hazards regression model was fitted to the clinical endpoint of recurrence-free interval for the 711 patients who were randomized to surgery alone. The Recurrence Score result was significantly associated with risk of recurrence (p=0.004), disease-free survival (p=0.01) and overall survival (p=0.04). In a protocol-specified multivariate analysis, the Recurrence Score result remained significantly associated with recurrence after simultaneously controlling for the prognostic effects of MMR status, T stage, tumor grade, number of nodes examined, and lymphovascular invasion. The Recurrence Score result retaining a similar hazard ratio and a similar significance level to those observed in the univariate analyses (HR per Interquartile range=1.43, p=0.006). Taken together, these findings demonstrate that the Recurrence Score result provides quantitative information regarding recurrence risk in stage II colon cancer beyond other existing tumor markers.

=== CALGB 9581 ===
Supporting the original QUASAR study, additional results from a second clinical validation study of stage II colon cancer patients enrolled in CALGB 9581 further confirmed that the Recurrence Score result improves the ability to differentiate higher from lower recurrence risk beyond conventional factors, such as tumor grade, number of nodes examined, and lymphovascular invasion. Among stage II patients with no observable high risk features, the Recurrence Score result identified 22% of patients with an average risk of recurrence at 5 years above 20%. A high Recurrence Score result reveals an underlying biology indicative of more aggressive disease for which adjuvant therapy may be considered.

=== Absolute benefit ===
In a pre-specified analysis from the QUASAR validation study, the Recurrence Score result did not demonstrate a significant interaction with treatment (p=0.69). The proportional benefit of adjuvant 5FU/LV was not significantly different across the range of Recurrence Score results. In the setting where proportional benefit with treatment is similar across a population, absolute benefit with treatment is expected to be smaller at low levels of baseline risk and rise as baseline risk increases. Stage II colon cancer patients with a lower recurrence risk, as predicted by Recurrence Score result, would be expected to derive relatively small absolute benefit with adjuvant therapy, which may prompt stronger consideration of observation following surgery. On the other hand, patients with a higher risk of recurrence would be expected to derive larger absolute benefit with adjuvant therapy, which may warrant stronger consideration of post-operative chemotherapy.

=== Health economic studies ===
An economic study assessing Oncotype DX assay in stage II colon cancer management demonstrated that clinical use of the Oncotype DX Recurrence Score result to assess risk of recurrence in T3 stage II colon cancers with MMR proficient status may improve quality-adjusted life expectancy and be cost-saving from a societal perspective. In this model, patient age and disutility associated with chemotherapy were important considerations in adjuvant treatment decisions.
