= Aclara =

Aclara may refer to:

- Aclara Biosciences, a medical technology company in existence from 1995 to 2004
- Aclara Resources, a mining company established in 2021
