= Invitae =

American biotechnology company

Invitae Corporation
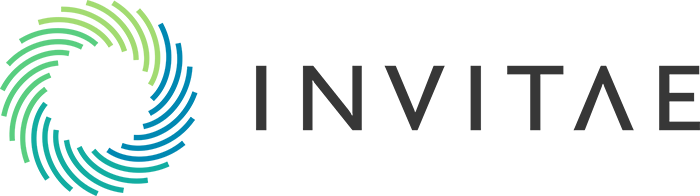
- Type: Public
- Traded as: Expert Market: NVTAQ
- Industry: Genetic testing
- Founded: 2010; 16 years ago
- Headquarters: San Francisco, California, U.S.
- Key people: Kenneth D. Knight (CEO)
- Revenue: US$279.6 million (2020)
- Net income: US$–608.9 million (2020)
- Website: www.invitae.com/en

Invitae Corp. is a biotechnology company that was created as a subsidiary of Genomic Health in 2010 and then spun-off in 2012.

In 2017, Invitae acquired Good Start Genetics and CombiMatrix. In 2020, Invitae announced the acquisition of ArcherDX for $1.4 billion. In 2021, Invitae announced the acquisition of health care AI startup Ciitizen for $325 million.

In early 2024, Invitae filed for Chapter 11 bankruptcy protection, and later announced an agreement for an acquisition by Labcorp.

== CombiMatrix Corp. ==
CombiMatrix Corp. (Nasdaq: CBMX) was a clinical diagnostic laboratory specializing in pre-implantation genetic screening, miscarriage analysis, prenatal and pediatric diagnostics, offering DNA-based testing for the detection of genetic abnormalities beyond what can be identified through traditional methodologies. As a full-scale cytogenetic and cytogenomic laboratory, CombiMatrix performs genetic testing utilizing a variety of advanced cytogenomic techniques, including chromosomal microarray analysis, standardized and customized fluorescence in situ hybridization (FISH) and high-resolution karyotyping. CombiMatrix is dedicated to providing high-level clinical support for healthcare professionals in order to help them incorporate the results of complex genetic testing into patient-centered medical decision making.

In 2012 CombiMatrix shifted its focus from providing oncology genetic testing to developmental testing. Their focus is cytogenomic miscarriage analysis, prenatal analysis and postnatal/pediatric analysis.

=== History ===
In the mid-1990s, a PhD from Caltech invented a method of analyzing and immobilizing genetic material on the surface of a modified semiconductor wafer. The CombiMatrix microarray ("CombiMatrix" refers to combinatorial chemistry on a matrix array) was born and received US patents in the late '90s. Located in Mukilteo, Washington, the company received several rounds of private financings and filed to go public in November 2000. Unfortunately, CombiMatrix missed its "IPO window" by a few months due to the turmoil that was happening in the financial markets in late 2000 and early 2001, and then the events of Sept. 11 2001 put the final "nail in the coffin" to the company's fundraising plans at the time. So, CombiMatrix shifted gears and began pursuing several funded R&D projects to further develop its proprietary microarray technology with outside entities such as Roche Applied Sciences in Europe, biotech researchers in Japan as well as the U.S. Department of Defense. In late 2002, CombiMatrix merged with and became a wholly owned subsidiary of Acacia Research Corporation of Newport Beach, California.

From 2002 to 2007, CombiMatrix continued its commercial development of "CustomArray" as it was called and began selling its DNA synthesis instruments and arrays to various R&D facilities throughout the United States, Europe and Asia. In an effort to diversify the company from the "tools" R&D sector, the company created CombiMatrix Molecular Diagnostics, Inc. and opened a diagnostics lab in Irvine, California, which was originally led by former US Labs employees with the intent of entering the much larger clinical diagnostics market using its proprietary microarray platform for oncology-related diagnostic services. CMD then branched into pediatric diagnostic testing by introducing other array technologies beyond the CustomArray platform. In 2007, CombiMatrix spun out from Acacia Research Corp. and became an independent public company in August of that year.

By 2010, the clinical lab business was showing promise, while the legacy CustomArray tools business was not achieving the commercial success that was needed to grow the company. As a result, the CombiMatrix Board made the difficult decision to scuttle the CustomArray tools business in Washington state and instead focus all commercial and operational resources on the diagnostic services business in California. By the end of 2010, the Irvine CLIA lab was the sole remaining commercial operations of CombiMatrix. The company has launched genetic diagnostic tests in oncology, pediatric disorders, and reproductive health, with reproductive health becoming the primary revenue stream of the company.

On February 5, 2024, The Wall Street Journal reported that the company was preparing to file for bankruptcy. The following day, the New York Stock Exchange announced it was delisting the company's stock and trading halted. On February 13, 2024, Invitae declared Chapter 11 bankruptcy in New Jersey.

=== CombiSNP Array ===
CombiMatrix uses the CombiSNP Array as their technology platform. SNP stands for Single nucleotide polymorphism probes. These probes allow for increased precision and greater diagnostic yield. This array contains more than 845,000 SNP markers covering both coding and non-coding human genome sequences. The median spatial resolution between probes is 1 Kb within gene rich regions and 5 Kb outside of gene-rich regions.
