= Centre for Applied Philosophy, Politics and Ethics =

- Established: 2005
- Mission: research on the links between philosophy, critical theory, global ethics, other disciplines and the wider public
- President: Bob Brecher
- Website: arts.brighton.ac.uk/re/cappe

The Centre for Applied Philosophy, Politics and Ethics (CAPPE) is a research center at the University of Brighton. The Centre is under the directorship of Bob Brecher and Mark Devenney. It "researches the links between philosophy, critical theory, global ethics, other disciplines and the wider public."

== See also ==
- Centre for Applied Philosophy and Public Ethics
