= Wellness Corporate Solutions =

Defunct American workplace wellness company

- Type: Private
- Industry: Workplace wellness
- Founded: 2004
- Founder: Fiona Gathright and Juliet Rodman
- Defunct: 2019
- Fate: Acquired
- Successor: Labcorp
- Headquarters: Bethesda, Maryland, United States
- Services: Biometric screening, Wellness Coaching
- Number of employees: 88 (2015)
- Website: wellnesscorporatesolutions.com

Wellness Corporate Solutions was an American company that worked to promote healthy workplace cultures through biometric screenings, health coaching, and comprehensive wellness programming.

== History ==
Founded in 2004 by Fiona Gathright and Juliet Rodman, Wellness Corporate Solutions recorded 644% revenue growth between 2010 and 2013.

WCS's clients include a variety of large public and private-sector organizations, including a few Fortune 100 corporations.

WCS gave all its employees standing desks, mid-day fitness breaks, and workout groups.

== Acquisition ==
The company was acquired by Labcorp in 2019.

== See also ==
- Migration and Health Research Center
- American Industrial Hygiene Association
