= Biomatrica =

Biotechnology company based in the USA

Biomatrica, Inc.
- Type: Subsidiary
- Industry: Biotechnology
- Founded: 2004; 22 years ago
- Headquarters: San Diego, California, United States
- Area served: Worldwide
- Parent: Exact Sciences
- Website: biomatrica.com

Biomatrica, Inc. is a United States-based biotechnology company, and subsidiary of Exact Sciences Corporation, that develops chemicals for ambient temperature preservation of biological materials for the purpose of expanding the availability and accuracy of medical diagnostics and research. Specifically, the company focuses on improving the stability of biological materials, such as DNA, RNA, proteins, cells from patient samples used in research, and diagnostic testing reagents. Company scientists have developed alternatives to existing preservation technologies, such as cold storage and lyophilization (freeze-drying), to prevent degradation of perishable biological materials. Biomatrica's technologies are used in applications such as pre-analytic sample collection, diagnostic assays, biobanking, forensics, and basic research.

== History ==
Biomatrica was founded by scientists, Judy Müller-Cohn, PhD, and Rolf Müller, PhD, in 2004. Prior to founding Biomatrica, both had worked in San Diego's biotechnology industry. Müller-Cohn had previously worked at Digital Gene Technologies and Mycogen/ Dow Agrosciences, whilst Müller had worked on the HIV Core Program Project Grant at San Diego's Scripps Research Institute.

Biomatrica initially developed ambient temperature storage reagents for DNA and RNA. The company's core technology was inspired by the phenomenon of anhydrobiosis, the ability of some organisms to hibernate in a desiccated state during dry periods, and then reanimate upon contact with water. Focusing on microscopic, desert-dwelling creatures called Tardigrades, which undergo anhydrobiosis for up to 120 years, Biomatrica identified how to chemically mimic the mechanism of anhydrobiosis. Following stabilization at room temperature with Biomatrica's chemical reagents, biological specimens could be rehydrated for subsequent studies with the addition of a few drops of water.

Since 2012, the company has become increasingly focused on its pre-analytic collection and assay stabilization service businesses described below.

In October 2018 Biomatrica was acquired by the Madison, Wisconsin-based molecular diagnostics and cancer screening company Exact Sciences Corporation for $20 million.

== Products and Services ==
The company's first product was a dry, synthetic polymer, "DNAstable" (originally “SampleMatrix”), a chemical formulation that stabilized purified DNA at ambient temperature. The company later released RNAstable and CloneStable, dry chemical reagents optimized for stabilizing purified RNA and bacterial plasmid DNA, respectively.

In 2007, the German biotechnology company, Qiagen, licensed DNAstable for sale under the trade name QIAsafe. Biomatrica and Qiagen subsequently co-developed QIAsafe Blood, an ambient temperature stabilization reagent for unpurified DNA in whole blood. Later in 2007, Biomatrica released molecular assay enhancement products, PCRboost and STRboost, for enhancement of PCR performed on degraded and trace DNA samples. Liquid versions of DNAstable and RNAstable were launched as DNAstable LD and RNAstable LD in 2011 and 2012, respectively. These liquid products provide more flexibility for diverse experimental formats, including those utilizing automated instrumentation.

Biomatrica began commercialization of preanalytical products in 2009 with the launch of its “gard” product line. These products include RNAgard Blood, DNAgard Blood, and DNAgard Tissue and Cells, products designed to stabilize biological samples from collection to analytical testing. In 2013, the company launched a device, DNAgard Saliva, for the collection of salivary DNA samples to be used in a variety of research studies. In 2015, a completely redesigned and improved version of this device was launched under the name DNAgard Saliva HT. This new version is designed and optimized for use by high-throughput laboratory automation instruments. In 2017, the company launched LBgard Blood Tubes, which allow collection and preservation of cfDNA for 14 days, and CTCs and WBCs for 4 days, for liquid biopsy and NIPT applications.

In 2012, the company began offering custom stabilization services to diagnostic assay manufacturers under the trade name, AssayStable. This service allowed improved manufacturing and stability of diagnostic test kits. After completing several successful contracts with large diagnostic manufacturers, the company launched a related service, PCRstable, that focused specifically on improving stability of PCR-based, molecular diagnostic assays, including those using microfluidic chips and specialized cartridges and cassettes. To facilitate testing and adoption of the company's stabilizers, Biomatrica launched the ReadyDry PCR Stabilizer Screening Kit in 2016.

== Partnerships and Agreements ==
Licensing agreements for Biomatrica technologies were signed with Qiagen in 2007 and 2009.

Following the launch of DNAstable, the company gained the interest of law enforcement organizations, such as the California Department of Justice, which sought to stabilize DNA samples from crime scenes for forensics purposes. Other law enforcement organizations, including sheriffs’ departments in Orange County, CA Los Angeles, CA, and Palm Beach, FL, have adopted ambient temperature forensic sample management systems based on Biomatrica's technologies.

Also in 2010, Biomatrica signed a collaborative research and development agreement (CRADA) with United States Army Medical Research Institute for Infectious Diseases (USAMRIID) to develop and test new technologies for ambient temperature stabilization of clinical and biological samples.

The same year, Biomatrica began a partnership agreement with the U.S. National Cancer Institute (NCI) for biomarker stabilization and SAIC-Frederick to improve molecular analysis of tumors.

In 2011, the company announced a partnership agreement with In-Q-Tel, an investment firm that identifies technologies to support the mission of the U.S. intelligence community.

In 2014, Biomatrica and American Type Tissue Culture (ATCC) signed a licensing agreement for Biomatrica to supply its DNA & RNA stabilization reagents to the ATCC for use in the latter company's DNA and RNA standards. In the same year, Biomatrica and Sigma-Aldrich signed an agreement for the worldwide distribution of Biomatrica's stabilization reagents.

== Corporate governance ==
- Nick Ecos, MBA, Chief Executive Officer.
- Pankaj Singhal, Ph.D., Senior Vice-President, Strategy Development & Operations.
- Anthony Broad, M.B.A., Chief Financial Officer
- Steven Schaefers, M.B.A., Senior Director, Operations
