= Torture and the Ticking Bomb =

2007 novel by Bob Brecher

- Author: Bob Brecher
- Subject: Ethical arguments regarding torture
- Published: 2007
- Publisher: Wiley-Blackwell
- Pages: 116 pp.
- ISBN: 9781405162029

Torture and the Ticking Bomb is a 2007 book by Bob Brecher in which the author examines ticking time bomb scenario, provides arguments against justifying torture based on consequentialist grounds and attacks interrogational torture and its legalisation.
