= Brecker =

Brecker is a surname. Notable people with the surname include:

- Randy Brecker (b. 1945), American musician, brother of Michael
- Michael Brecker (1949–2007), American musician, brother of Randy
- Allison Shearmur (née Brecker; 1963–2018), American film executive and producer

== See also ==
- Brecher
