= Aclara Biosciences =

- Industry: Medical technology
- Predecessor: Soane Technologies
- Founded: May 5, 1995
- Defunct: December 10, 2004
- Fate: Defunct
- Successor: Virologic
- Headquarters: Mountain View, California, United States
- Key people: Thomas Klopack (CEO)
- Number of employees: >170 (2003)

Aclara Biosciences, Inc. (also stylized as ACLARA Biosciences) was a medical technology company, focused on developing applications of microfluidics for use in laboratory testing. It was publicly traded on NASDAQ under the symbol ACLA.

== History ==
Aclara Biosciences was founded in 1995 as Soane BioSciences, Inc. in Delaware, and was renamed Aclara Biosciences, Inc. in 1998. The company subsequently relocated its headquarters to Mountain View, California, and its initial public offering of 9 million shares took place on the NASDAQ stock exchange in March 2000. Also in 2000, Aclara was sued by Caliper Technologies for allegedly misappropriating Caliper's trade secrets in regard to the latter company's microfluidics technology. This suit represented one of several legal battles between the two companies, each of which accused the other of infringing on their patents. On October 26, 2000, a jury in California found Aclara guilty of misappropriating trade secrets and awarded Caliper $52,568,000. In 2004, it was reported that Aclara would be purchased by Virologic for $180 million in stock, the equivalent of $4.78 per share. In December 2004, Virologic completed its acquisition of Aclara for $160 million in stock; each of Aclara's shareholders received 1.7 shares of Virologic stock for each share of Aclara stock they had owned.

== Products ==
Aclara received 96 patents during its history. Its best-known product was its proprietary eTag (short for "electrophoretic tag") assay technology designed for use on proteins and nucleic acids. In October 2004, Aclara entered into an arrangement with GlaxoSmithKline to test these assays for potential use in cancer drug development.
