= Dynacare =

Canadian healthcare company

Gamma-Dynacare Medical Laboratories
- Company type: Partnership
- Traded as: Dynacare
- Industry: Health Care
- Headquarters: Brampton, Ontario, Canada
- Services: Clinical Laboratory
- Number of employees: 2500
- Website: dynacare.ca

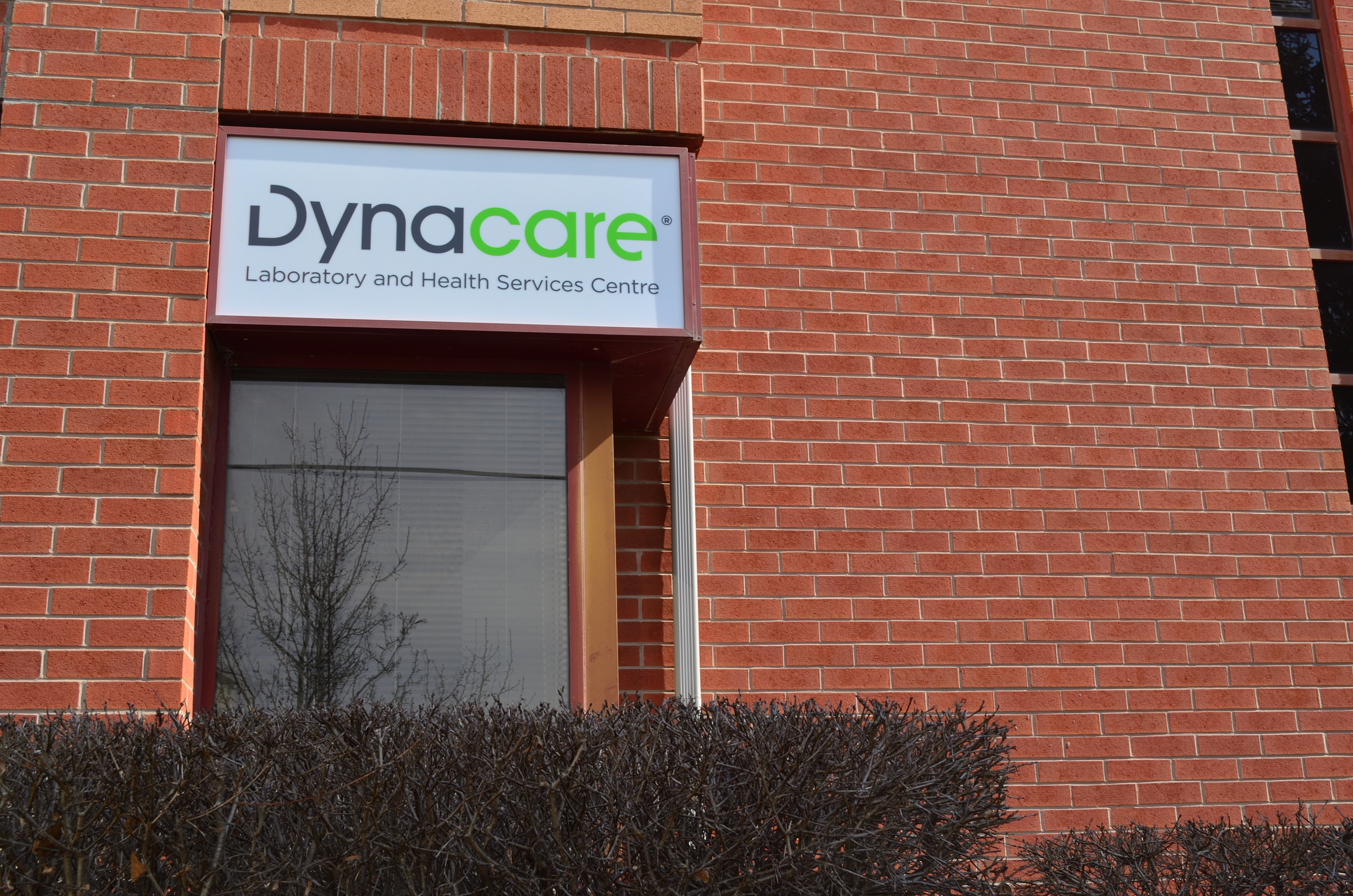
Dynacare in Markham, Ontario

Gamma-Dynacare Medical Laboratories is a Canadian medical laboratory services company based in Brampton, Ontario, Canada. Dynacare operates laboratories in Brampton, Bowmanville, London, Ottawa, Thunder Bay, Pointe-Claire, Laval, and Winnipeg. In addition to the main laboratories Dynacare operates patient services centers throughout Ontario, Quebec, Manitoba, Saskatchewan, Alberta and British Columbia.

Dynacare is an operational partnership founded in 1997 as Gamma-Dynacare between: Dynacare Laboratories; Gamma North Peel Partnership Inc.; and Bio-Science Laboratory (Ontario) Limited. In 2002 Dynacare Laboratories (one of the Dynacare partners) was acquired by LabCorp for $480-million (U.S.) while also assuming Dynacare debt worth $205-million. In 2015, it rebranded itself back to Dynacare.

In 2011 Dynacare acquired the medical laboratory division of Warnex Inc. (TSX:WNX) for $7.5 Million.

In 2023 Dynacare acquired the medical laboratories in British Columbia known as Valley Medical Laboratories. This increased the Dynacare presence in British Columbia by adding about 12 locations in Kelowna and throughout the Okanagan Valley.
