= Sequenom =

American life sciences company

Sequenom, Inc.
- Company type: Subsidiary
- Traded as: NYSE: SQNM (2000–2016)
- Industry: Biotechnology
- Founded: 1 January 1994
- Headquarters: San Diego, California, US
- Key people: Dirk van den Boom (CEO)
- Products: MaterniT21 PLUS, MaterniT GENOME, VisibiliT, HerediT CF, HerediT UNIVERSAL, NextView, SensiGene RHD
- Services: Non-Invasive Prenatal Testing (NIPT), Carrier Screening
- Parent: LabCorp (2016–present)
- Website: www.sequenom.com

Sequenom, Inc. is an American company based in San Diego, California. It develops enabling molecular technologies, and highly sensitive laboratory genetic tests for NIPT. Sequenom's wholly owned subsidiary, Sequenom Center for Molecular Medicine (SCMM), offers multiple clinical molecular genetics tests to patients, including MaterniT21, plus a noninvasive prenatal test for trisomy 21, trisomy 18, and trisomy 13, and the SensiGene RHD Fetal RHD genotyping test.

The company went public via an initial public offering in 2000. In June 2014 the company sold its biosciences unit to Agena Bioscience for up to $35.8 million. In July 2016, it was announced that diagnostic and testing giant LabCorp will acquire Sequenom, paying $2.40 for every outstanding share of Sequenom stock. The acquisition was completed in September 2016.

== Competition ==
Companies also offering non-invasive prenatal genetic testing include Ariosa, Ravgen, Illumina (Verinata Health), PerkinElmer and Natera (The Panorama Prenatal Test). Other companies and universities that are working towards developing non-invasive prenatal testing include Stanford University.

== Patent litigation ==
In January 2012, Sequenom entered a patent battle with competing companies, Ariosa and Natera, accusing them of infringing the "540 patent" (US 6258540). The cases are Sequenom Inc. v. Natera Inc. 12-cv-0184, Sequenom v. Ariosa Diagnostics Inc., 12-cv-0189, U.S. District Court, Southern District of California (San Diego), and Ariosa v. Sequenom.

Verinatal Health and Stanford University later filed suit against Sequenom in a dispute over the 'Quake patent'. Verinata claims that Sequenom's lawyers sent it a letter in 2010 alleging that "'the practice of non-invasive prenatal diagnostics, including diagnosis of the Down Syndrome and other genetic disorders, using cell-free nucleic acids in a sample of maternal blood infringes' the '540 patent, as well as the claims of a pending United States Patent Application." The '540 patent was invented by Isis Ltd. and expires in 2017.

Stanford University owns the Quake patents and licensing rights; Verinata is its exclusive licensee.

In April 2012, Sequenom acquired two pending patents from Helicos Biosciences. In consideration for the sale and transfer of the purchased assets, Sequenom paid Helicos $1.3 million. The Helicos patent applications (US Patent application 12/709,057 and 12/727,824) cover methods for detecting fetal nucleic acids and diagnosing fetal abnormalities.

In July 2012, The United States District Court denied Sequenom's motion for a preliminary injunction motion against Ariosa Diagnostics.

In August 2013, The Court of Appeals for the Federal Circuit vacated the District Court decision and remanded that case to the District Court.

In the Ariosa litigation, the District Court (N.D.Cal.) held that the '540 patent was invalid because it claimed a natural phenomenon, the presence of cell-free fetal DNA fragments in maternal blood. On June 13, 2015, the CAFC affirmed the District Court's judgment. Finally, on December 2, 2015, the Federal Circuit declined to rehear en banc.

== SEQureDx scandal ==
In 2009, Sequenom Center for Molecular Medicine (SCMM) was expected to launch the SEQureDx prenatal screening tests for Down syndrome and Rhesus D. Subsequent investigation revealed significant flaws in the studies of the test's effectiveness. As a result, the board of directors of Sequenom fired CEO Harry Stylli, senior vice president of research and development Elizabeth Dragon and three other employees after a probe discovered that the company had failed to adequately supervise its Down syndrome test. CFO Paul Hawran also resigned. Board chairman Harry F. Hixson Jr. was named interim CEO and director Ronald M. Lindsay was appointed to replace Dragon. Dragon has since been charged by the Securities and Exchange Commission (SEC) because she "lied to the public about the accuracy of Sequenom's prenatal screening test for Down syndrome". She died on February 26, 2011.

In 2010, Sequenom paid $14 million to settle a shareholder class-action lawsuit that arose from the errors in the development of the Down syndrome test. Sequenom executives are under investigation by the SEC for insider trading before announcement of problems with the test.

On September 1, 2011, Sequenom entered into a cease-and-desist order with SEC.

== MaterniT21 PLUS ==
MaterniT21 PLUS is Sequenom Center for Molecular Medicine's prenatal test for trisomy 21 (Down syndrome), trisomy 18 (Edwards syndrome) and trisomy 13 (Patau syndrome). The test operates by sampling cell-free DNA in the mother's blood, which contains some DNA from the fetus. The proportions of DNA from sequences from chromosome 21, 18, or 13 can indicate whether the fetus has trisomy in that chromosome. In a randomized controlled trial of 1,696 pregnancies at high risk for Down syndrome, the test correctly identified 98.6% of the actual cases of Down syndrome (209 out of 212), with a false positive rate of 0.2% (3 of 1471 pregnancies without Down); the test gave no result in 0.8% of the cases tested (13 of 1696).

The primary advantage of MaterniT21 PLUS over the other major high accuracy tests for Down syndrome, Amniocentesis and Chorionic villus sampling, is that MaterniT21 PLUS is noninvasive. Because amniocentesis and chorionic villus sampling are invasive, they have a chance of causing miscarriage.

=== History ===
On August 4, 2011, Sequenom said it would call its new blood test for Down syndrome in pregnancy MaterniT21 when the product went on sale in the United States.

On August 11, 2011, Sequenom announced a European licensing agreement with LifeCodexx. The companies agreed to collaborate in the development and launch of a trisomy 21 laboratory-developed test and other aneuploidies testing in Germany, Austria, Switzerland, and Liechtenstein, with the potential for additional launches in other countries. Under the initial five year licensing agreement, Sequenom granted LifeCodexx licenses to key patent rights, including European Patent EP0994963B1 and pending application EP2183693A1 that enable the development and commercialization of a non-invasive aneuploidy test utilizing circulating cell-free fetal DNA in maternal plasma.

On October 24, 2011 International Society of Prenatal Diagnostics (ISPD) issued a rapid response statement in response to the launch of Sequenom non-invasive Trisomy 21 (MaterniT21) test.

On October 17, 2011 Sequenom announced that a clinical validation study leading to the introduction of the MaterniT21 LDT had been published in the journal Genetics in Medicine. On October 17, 2011 Sequenom Center for Molecular Medicine announced the launch of MaterniT21 Noninvasive Prenatal Test for Down Syndrome.

== MassARRAY Analyzer 4 ==
Sequenom Oncomap Version 3 – "core" set interrogates ~450 mutations in 35 genes. An "extended" set interrogates ~700 mutations in 113 genes.

Sequenom OncoCarta(OncoMap) identifies 396 unique "druggable" or "actionable" mutations in 33 cancer genes. In total, 417 mutations are identified.

MassARRAY spectrometry is more sensitive than PreTect HPV-Proofer and Consensus PCR for type-specific detection of high-risk oncogenic human papillomavirus genotypes in cervical cancer.

== iPLEX ADME PGx Panel on MassARRAY System ==
On October 4, 2011 Sequenom introduced iPLEX ADME PGx Panel on MassARRAY System, developed to genotype polymorphisms in genes associated with drug absorption, distribution, metabolism, and excretion (ADME). This Research Use Only (RUO) panel contains a set of pre-designed single nucleotide polymorphisms (SNP), insertions and deletions (INDELS) and copy number variation (CNV) assays for use in the investigation of variants with demonstrated relevance to drug metabolism. After detection on the MassARRAY (RUO) system, a proprietary software solution is then used to score and qualify polymorphisms to create a unique haplotype report.
