= National Institute for Pharmaceutical Technology & Education =

American pharmacy academia non-profit

The National Institute for Pharmaceutical Technology and Education (NIPTE) is a non-profit scientific and research and development organization that was established in 2005 and incorporated in June 2007 in the State of Indiana. Its offices are currently located in Minneapolis, Minnesota.

NIPTE's current membership includes 18 leading schools and colleges of pharmacy and chemical engineering from the following universities: University of Mississippi, Duquesne University, University of Rochester, Illinois Institute of Technology, Purdue University, Rutgers University, University of Puerto Rico, Long Island University, University of Connecticut, University of Texas at Austin, University of Iowa, University of Kentucky, University of Maryland, Texas A&M University, University of Michigan, University of Minnesota, University of Kansas and University of Wisconsin.

== Pharmaceutical manufacturing challenge ==
The pharmaceutical industry is currently facing increased pricing pressures globally and rising manufacturing costs. Cost of Goods (COGS) for Brand-Name pharmaceutical drugs can be higher than 30% of the total sales revenues of these companies. In comparison, the percentage of sales revenues spent on R&D by these pharmaceutical companies is only 10-15%. For generic drugs, COGS can be as high as 50% of their total sales revenues. Traditionally, pharmaceutical companies preferred to manufacture their own products internally. They were keen on "making" what they "sold" because it provided them with more control of the quality of their products. However, since the pressures to reduce cost these days are high, to save money, the pharmaceutical industry is increasingly outsourcing manufacturing to countries in Asia – where the regulatory standards are evolving and sometimes could lag several years behind the U.S.

The science required to transform a new discovery to a marketable new drug has not exactly kept up with advances in drug discovery. Once the new drug discovery is made, product development and manufacturing are left to traditional "tried and true" practices. Marked advances in chemistry, chemical engineering, computer modeling & simulation, instrumentation, analytical science, and product formulations that could be used to increase efficiency may also be more gainfully applied in pharmaceutical product development and manufacturing. The cost savings achievable by outsourcing can be exceeded by improving the science and technology for developing and manufacturing pharmaceutical products. Other industries, such as the semiconductor industry have examined their manufacturing technologies and have modernized them. This has allowed these industries to become more competitive and improve products quality.

Manufacturing is a critical step in the chain of events before a drug reaches pharmacy shelves. When that critical link is broken, it opens the door for something like the heparin crisis.

The public/private partnership model for drug discovery (known as the NIH Roadmap) shows success by spurring advances with strong basic science research investment. Between 1999 and 2006, research and development investments in the United States grew 5 times the initial investment while in Europe it grew 2.9 times. However, since 2006 Asia has markedly outpaced the U.S. in the opening of new research sites for pharmaceuticals.

== Research agenda ==
NIPTE's goal is to increase science and engineering-based understanding of this area such that new technologies can be developed and science-based regulations can be implemented. These technologies will also enable new drug discoveries to be brought to market faster with less variability, higher predictability of performance and at a significantly lower cost. NIPTE's research agenda is to conduct fundamental and basic research that will:

- Develop science‐based understanding of pharmaceutical materials, their processing characteristics and performance in manufacturing;
- Create innovative engineering tools needed to develop, design and scale up cost novel effective processes for the manufacturing of active pharmaceutical ingredients (API);
- Develop model‐predictive approaches for drug product formulation and manufacturing process design;
- Create novel manufacturing technologies that allow flexible and cost effective manufacturing of multiple products in the same production line or continuously, to replace current dedicated, largely batch‐wise operated lines;
- Invent and demonstrate new sensing and control technologies that allow critical product and process variables to be monitored continuously and controlled automatically in order to dramatically reduce current, wasteful reliance on quality control via end of production testing and off‐spec rejection;
- Create an educational model that synergistically integrates and intimately combines core concepts and methods from Pharmaceutical Sciences and Engineering, with input from Chemistry and Materials Science, to train professionals capable of facilitating systematic product design, process understanding, optimization, and control;
- Create and deliver educational and training programs that will prepare the technical cadre needed by the industry and the FDA to implement and regulate these new technologies.

NIPTE has developed Strategic Roadmap for Research and Technology which outlines current and future challenges and proposed solutions in pharmaceutical science.

NIPTE's membership includes leading schools and colleges of pharmacy and chemical and pharmaceutical engineering, and has overlapping scientific interests with pharmaceutical scientists (e.g. American Association of Pharmaceutical Sciences).
