= Bob Brecher =

British philosopher (born 1949)

- Born: 1949 (age 76–77)
- Awards: British Academy award

Education
- Education: University of Kent (BA & PhD)

Philosophical work
- Era: 21st-century philosophy
- Region: Western philosophy
- Institutions: University of Brighton
- Main interests: political philosophy, ethics

Bob Brecher (born 1949) is a British philosopher and Professor of Philosophy at the University of Brighton. He is known for his expertise on ethics and political philosophy. Brecher is co-director of Centre for Applied Philosophy, Politics and Ethics and a former president of Association for Social and Political Philosophy (2000-2003). He founded Res Publica in 1995.

== Books ==
- Anselm's Argument: the Logic of Divine Existence (Gower, 1985)
- Torture and the Ticking Bomb (Blackwell, 2007)
- Getting What You Want? A Critique of Liberal Morality (Routledge, 1997)

=== Edited ===
- Liberalism and the New Europe, with Otakar Fleischmann (Avebury, 1993)
- The University in a Liberal State, with Otakar Fleischmann (Avebury, 1996)
- Nationalism and Racism in the Liberal Order, with Jo Halliday and Klára Kolinská (Avebury, 1998)
- The New Order of War (Rodopi, 2010)
- Discourses and Practices of Terrorism: Interrogating Terror, with Mark Devenney and Aaron Winter (Routledge, 2010)
