= Epic Sciences =

- Type: Private company
- Industry: Liquid biopsy, oncology, clinical diagnostic, companion diagnostic
- Founded: 2008
- Headquarters: San Diego, California, U.S.
- Area served: Worldwide
- Key people: Lloyd Sanders, President and CEO
- Products: Service analyzing circulating tumor cells
- Website: epicsciences.com

Epic Sciences is a company founded in 2008, offering medical diagnostics characterizing circulating tumor cells. Its technology is licensed from Scripps Research Institute, based on inventions made by Peter Kuhn's lab at Scripps.

Initially, Epic offered analysis services to companies developing drugs.

== Methods ==
The company's approach involves getting a blood sample, removing red blood cells, putting the remaining cells on a microscope slide, staining the cells with antibodies for a few cancer markers, imaging the slide, then using proprietary image analysis software that counts the stained cells and analyzes the cells based on morphophology and other factors; as of 2014 it took the software around two and a half hours to analyze a single slide; around 12 slides are generated from a standard 7.5 mL blood sample.

As of 2014 it was offering its analysis services to drug companies as a way to measure outcomes in clinical trials.

== Organization ==
David Nelson was the first President and CEO. In 2012 Epic raised $13M in 2012 from Domain Associates, Roche Venture Fund and Pfizer Venture Investments.

By 2014 Murali Prahalad became the president and CEO, and in July of that year the company raised an additional $30M. In April 2017, Epic raised another $40 million and as of that date had raise a total of $85.5 million.
