= Mark Elliott Brecher =

American pathologist

Mark Elliot Brecher is a physician specializing in pathology, in particular blood transfusion.

== Biography ==
In 1982, Brecher earned a MD at the University of Chicago Pritzker School of Medicine; he also had his residency training in anatomic and clinical pathology there. He subsequently completed a blood banking and transfusion medicine fellowship at the Mayo Clinic.

== Professional career ==
He was a member of the faculty of the Mayo Clinic Department of Laboratory Medicine and Pathology from 1988 to 1992, and then moved to the University of North Carolina as a member of the faculty and vice-chair in the Department of Pathology and Laboratory Medicine from 1992 to 2009.

In 2009 he became the Chief Medical Officer for the Laboratory Corporation of America, while retaining a position as adjunct professor of pathology and laboratory medicine at the University of North Carolina. In 2018, he retired and became an Emeritus Professor at the University of North Carolina.

== Professional service ==
From 2001 to 2005 he chaired the United States Department of Health and Human Services (DHHS) Advisory Committee on Blood Safety and Availability. He served as the president of the American Society for Apheresis (2005 to 2006) and has received that society's ASFA Lecturer's award (2010), the Presidential award (2011) and the Morrison Memorial Lecture Award (2016). In 2020, he received the Tibby Greenwalt Memorial award from the Association for the Advancement of Blood and Biotherapies (AABB). His research and advocacy contributed to reducing the risk of bacterial contamination of blood products for transfusion.

== Publications ==
His most cited, peer-reviewed publications are:

- Goodnough LT, Brecher ME, Kanter MH, AuBuchon JP. Transfusion medicine—blood transfusion. New England Journal of Medicine. 1999 Feb 11;340(6):438-47. (Cited 1068 times, according to Google Scholar)
- Slichter SJ, Kaufman RM, Assmann SF, McCullough J, Triulzi DJ, Strauss RG, Gernsheimer TB, Ness PM, Brecher ME, Josephson CD, Konkle BA. Dose of prophylactic platelet transfusions and prevention of hemorrhage. New England Journal of Medicine. 2010 Feb 18;362(7):600-13. (Cited 548 times, according to Google Scholar.)
- Brecher ME, Hay SN. Bacterial contamination of blood components. Clinical microbiology reviews. 2005 Jan;18(1):195-204. (Cited 450 times, according to Google Scholar.)
- Goodnough LT, Shander A, Brecher ME. Transfusion medicine: looking to the future. The Lancet. 2003 Jan 11;361(9352):161-9.(Cited 409 times, according to Google Scholar.)
- Getchell JP, Wroblewski KE, DeMaria Jr A, Bean CL, Parker MM, Pandori M, Dufour DR, Busch MP, Brecher ME, Meyer WA, Pesano RL. Testing for HCV infection: an update of guidance for clinicians and laboratorians. MMWR. Morbidity and mortality weekly report. 2013 May 10;62(18):362. (Cited 292 times, according to Google Scholar.)
