= Genomic Health =

Genomic Health, Inc.
- Company type: Subsidiary
- Traded as: Nasdaq: GHDX
- Industry: Genomics
- Founded: August 2000; 25 years ago, in Redwood City, California, U.S.
- Founder: Randy Scott
- Successor: Exact Sciences
- Headquarters: Redwood City, California, U.S.
- Key people: Kimberly J. Popovits (chairman, president, & CEO); G. Bradley Cole (CFO)
- Products: Oncotype DX
- Number of employees: 863 (2017)
- Website: www.genomichealth.com

Genomic Health, Inc. is a company focusing on genetic research specifically in cancer detection, based out of Redwood City, California. The company was acquired by and merged with Exact Sciences Corporation in 2019.

== History ==
Genomic Health, Inc. was founded in 2000 by Randy Scott, who had previously founded and been CEO at Incyte. He formed the company after a close friend was diagnosed with cancer and had the idea for treatment based on the specific genome of their tumor.

By 2003 Genomic Health had developed Oncotype DX, a genomic assay that quantified the likelihood of breast cancer recurrence. This development took the company over three years and US$30,000,000 to complete and then had to convince skeptics at the time of the validity of genetic testing.

In July 2005 Genomic Health filed for an initial public offering to sell up to US$75,000,000 in common stock. Investors at the time already included Versant Ventures and Kleiner Perkins Caufield & Byers. On September 29, 2005 it was listed on the NASDAQ with the symbol GHDX with the initial share price of US$12 for 5016722 shares.

Genomic Health also started a subsidiary in 2010, Invitae, with the goal of aggregating multiple genetics tests. Invitae was spun off in 2012.

The company expanded with international headquarters in Geneva Switzerland and UK headquarters in London in 2011.

In July 2019, Exact Sciences announced that it was purchasing Genomic Health to increase the variety of medical tests they offer.

== See also ==
- Human genome
- Genetic testing
