= Personalized onco-genomics =

Personalized onco-genomics (POG) is the field of oncology and genomics that is focused on using whole genome analysis to make personalized clinical treatment decisions. The program was devised at British Columbia's BC Cancer Agency and is currently being led by Marco Marra and Janessa Laskin. Genome instability has been identified as one of the underlying hallmarks of cancer. The genetic diversity of cancer cells promotes multiple other cancer hallmark functions that help them survive in their microenvironment and eventually metastasise. The pronounced genomic heterogeneity of tumours has led researchers to develop an approach that assesses each individual's cancer to identify targeted therapies that can halt cancer growth. Identification of these "drivers" and corresponding medications used to possibly halt these pathways are important in cancer treatment.

With the oncogenomic databases that currently recognize mutation and abnormalities in the genomic structure of cancer cells, DNA, RNA, and protein analysis can be used to assess these changes and identify drivers of cancer growth. By decoding the genetic information inside cancer cells, researchers gather information which may help understand factors that promote tumour growth and develop strategies to stop it. Ideally, a catalogue of all somatic cancer mutations will be created in the future that can provide insight into the abnormal cellular pathways of cancer cells and the genetic patterns that drive specific cancer phenotypes. This information can help develop effective personalized treatment options for patients with resistant cancers and ideally prevent toxicities related to conventional chemotherapeutics.

== History ==
The novel approach of comparing a patient's tumour versus normal tissue was first identified in 2010 when assessing the genetic evolution of adenocarcinomas of tongue before and after treatment was received. This study presented evidence that the genetic information from these tumours have potential to influence the treatment options for cancers. After identifying the driver mutations of tumour was the RET oncogene, the patient was administered with a RET inhibitor (sunitinib), which stabilized the disease for 4 months. A second round of RET inhibitors (sorafenib and sulindac) administration provided an additional 3 months of disease stabilization before the cancer progressed again. The observed mutations and amplification in the recurring metastasis were identified to be consistent with resistance to the RET inhibitors. The evolution of the adenocarcinoma after treatment with RET inhibitors demonstrated with possibility for personalized cancer therapy. This approach was then successfully replicated in other cancer types and resulted in the formation of the Personalized Onco-Genomics Program at the BC Cancer Agency. This program has now analyzed over 570 adult cancer patients with incurable disease, which were published in a landmark study in 2020.

== Data availability ==
Genomic and transcriptomic sequence datasets from the 2020 Nature publication encompassing the first 570 "POG" patients have been deposited at the European Genome-phenome Archive (EGA, http://www.ebi.ac.uk/ega/) as part of the study EGAS00001001159. Data on mutations, copy changes and expression from tumour samples in the POG program organized by OncoTree classification (http://oncotree.mskcc.org) are also accessible from https://www.personalizedoncogenomics.org/cbioportal/. The complete small mutation catalog and gene expression TPMs are available for download from http://bcgsc.ca/downloads/POG570/.

== Rationale ==
OMICS technologies are high-throughput methods that help evaluate and unbiased investigate characteristics of the genome, epigenome, transcriptome, proteome, and metabolome.

A genome is the complete collection of an organism's DNA sequences, which contains instructions for cellular processes. In human diploid cells, 6 billion DNA base pairs of the genome can be found in the nucleus. The development of all cancers starts with a single cell accumulating enough harmful changes in DNA sequence that allow it to proliferate uncontrollably. Subsequently, the origin cell's fast-growing progeny invade surrounding tissues, migrate to other tissues.

In a typical tumour, several dozens of somatic mutations may be disrupting the normal function of proteins. The majority of somatic mutations are mere byproducts of the unstable cancer genome and do not enhance the tumour cell growth. Usually, between two and eight driver mutations, mutations that gives cancer cells growth advantages, are found amongst all the somatic mutations a tumour sample. Driver mutations may be actionable as they serve as diagnostic and prognostic biomarkers for cancer, and may have therapeutic implications. For instance, kinase inhibitors can be treating tumours associated with driver mutations in kinases. Axitinib, gefitinib, and dabrafenib to are used to treat adult acute lymphoblastic leukemia, non-small-cell lung cancer, and melanoma respectively.

As cancer can arise from countless different genetic mutations and a combination of mutations, it is challenging to develop a cure that is appropriate for all cancers, given the genetic diversity of the human population. To provide and develop the most appropriate genetic therapy for one's cancer, personalized oncogenomics has been developed. By sequencing a cancer patient's genome, a clinical scientist can better understand which genes/part of the genome have been mutated specifically in that patient and a personalized treatment plan can potentially be implemented.

== Methods ==
=== Whole Genome Analysis ===
With the advent of next-generation sequencing, the genome-wide sequencing analyses have been made more accessible to thoroughly understand the genetics of each patient's cancer. Genetic material from tumour biopsies can be analyzed by two genome-wide approaches: whole exome sequencing (WES) and whole genome sequencing (WGS). By developing tools to analyze these extensive sequence data, scientists have begun to comprehend how diseases, including cancer, can be attributed by genes and intergenic variants such as single nucleotide polymorphisms (SNPs) and copy number variants (CNVs).

Although more expensive than WES, whole genome sequencing allows clinical scientists to understand how cancer can be caused by alterations in a genome including single nucleotide variants (SNVs), SNPs and CNVs. Since WES samples only the exome (the collection of known coding regions of the genome) alterations in the non-coding region of the genome will not be detected by WES. Non-coding regions, including untranslated regions, introns, promoters, regulatory elements, non-coding functional RNA, repetitive regions, and mitochondrial genomes, make up 98% of the human genome, the function of most regions remains unexplored. Although these methods are useful in finding shorter variants, they are limited by read lengths of sequencing technology and are unable to detect large indels and structural variants.

Though variants in a non-coding region are not uncovered by WES, both approaches identify all mutations that are known to cause cancer in a given patient and have been helpful in identifying low frequency and rare pathogenic (disease-causing) variants. However, the challenge remains in analyzing all the genetic variations in a genome for the clinical significance (whether a mutation is disease-causing as not all mutations are harmful) as much of the genome is not thoroughly understood, and new variants are still being discovered.

To better understand the pathogenicity of all possible genomic variants to interpret WES/WGS data, researchers are systematically studying genome-wide sequencing data across many tumour genomes. Whole exome sequencing has been the conventional data used by international cancer genome research programs such as The Cancer Genome Atlas (TCGA) and The International Cancer Genome Consortium (ICGC). These studies have accumulated WES data for all types of human tumours and have been an open resource for clinical scientists. Systematically analyzing more than 50,000 tumour genomes has elucidated new cancer genes and pathways, opening up new pursuits for pharmaceutical companies. Researchers have also discovered general trends on different types of cancer that may inform public education on proactive preventative measures. For example, more somatic mutations in coding regions are found in carcinogen-exposed cancers than in pediatric tumours and leukemia. Although these systematic studies provide extensive mutational data on coding regions, information is limited on somatic mutations in non-coding regions. Researchers have only recently started to be illuminated on how cancer may be caused by variants in the non-coding regions of the genome. In 2018, Zhang and colleagues analyzed 930 tumour whole genomes with associated transcriptomes (collection of mRNA transcripts) to show mutations in 193 non-coding sequences disrupt normal gene expression. Notably, they repetitively found noncoding mutations affected DAAM1, MTG2, and HYI transcription wherein DAAM1 expression initiate invasive cell migration in the tumour. Since the core somatic gene expression network is defective in 88% tumours, Zhang et al. suggested that noncoding mutation may have a widespread impact in cancer. As the cost of sequencing decreases and sequence analytic pipeline optimizes, researchers are looking to expand cancer genomic knowledge with WGS. Nonetheless, WES may remain effective for clinical diagnosis in the next few years as WES results are obtained faster.

== Application ==
Treatment options for aggressive metastatic cancer typically have a poor response rate to conventional treatments. Through this novel approach, analysis of oncogenic factors is undertaken to identify the unique molecular signatures of the individual's tumour. In most cancers, there are multiple pathways that are altered and lead to disease growth and progression. The pathways can vary from person to person, and even between different sites of disease in a single person. These pathways also have the ability to evolve depending on the various treatment options attempted to halt progression.

The POGs program takes biopsies from metastatic tumours from patients, sequences both the DNA and RNA, and then research what is driving the person's cancer in an attempt to pick the right drug for the right person at the right time. Recognition of specific genetic abnormalities that are promoting cancer progression can help select non-conventional treatment options to target these abnormalities. This approach allows multiple clinicians to work together in a collaborative manner to tackle an aggressive disease. The genetic information collected from the tumour helps health-care professionals make rational clinical decisions regarding treatment strategies. These strategies may be used to target the growth of the tumour, identify potential clinical trials that patients could enrol in, and find more effective and less toxic drug options.

This approach has been successful in treating small subgroups of cancers with medication commonly used to treat chronic myeloid leukemia (CML). Imatinib targets a BCR-ABL translocation that appears in more than 95% of CML cases. The success of this drug in treating CML has highlighted the importance of personalized treatment options and identification of molecular pathways to be targeted. Imatinib is now also used to treat some stomach cancers after identifying the genetic alterations in this cancer type. Repurposing current treatment options that are used for other treatments and can halt cancer progression due to similarities in characteristics.

The success of the POGs program is highlighted by the identification of a novel genetic mutation in a 35-year-old recurrent breast cancer patient. Zuri Scrivens was enrolled in the POGs program at the BC Cancer agency to help devise a personalized novel therapy based on her tumour mutations. From the results of her tumour genome sequencing analysis, a drug that is most commonly used in the treatment of type 2 diabetes was selected to treat her recurrence along with a standard chemotherapy medication. With the combination of these medications, Zuri's cancer quickly returned into remission.

In the future, the use of this personalized onco-genomics approach may be the first step for the treatment of each person's cancer. There is a great depth of genetic information that can be extracted from each individual's cancer. Genomic data can provide valuable information regarding each individuals' cancer and guide clinical decision-making from health-care professionals.

== Challenges ==
There are multiple challenges that are preventing the adoption of POGs. The largest challenge is the identification of genetic factors that are promoting cancer growth. These "drivers" need to be understood before any actions can be taken against them. Although the costs of genetic testing have decreased significantly, the results can provide an enormous amount of genetic information that scientists haven't truly understood yet. Through the understanding of these "drivers" of the cancer growth, appropriate drug choices can be made to target them. Only a fraction of these drivers have been identified until now and more research is required help uncover many of cancer's characteristics.

Cancer cells are known for the thousands of genetic changes that are occurring within a single cell. Targeting these genetic changes requires a significant amount of research to identify which changes are drivers and which are "passengers". These passengers do not directly to cancerous growth. Unfortunately, medication is not currently available for every genetic change that may occur within a cancer cell and drive growth. With further research, more medications will be made and identified to target these genetic changes.

Another challenge with POGs is identifying new methods to overcome resistance from drug treatment. Some medications that are used to target cancers containing genetic changes cannot provide sustained benefits. Patients may experience either short-lived or long-term benefits from the medication, but since cancer is constantly evolving, it often develops even more genetic changes that allow it to adapt and survive against the drug. This drug resistance allows the cancers to grow back despite previously effective treatment. This has become a major challenge in treating cancers.

The POGs and other new cancer treatments are generally tested on patients with advanced cancers who have failed previous drug therapy. With time, cancer progresses and evolves based on the previous treatments the individual has received. These cancers are incredibly difficult to treat due to their drug resistance mechanisms. There is a growing acceptance that these new medications need to be tested in individuals much earlier so cancer does not have time to develop with resistance. As mentioned above, the development of liquid biopsies help provide patients with the right drug at the right time. A non-invasive method to help clinicians influence clinical decision making could become the basis of new clinical trials in the future.

The feasibility of undertaking this approach in all cancer centers remains one of the greatest challenges of any personalized program. Until it is feasible for every hospital and cancer center to have the technology required to study the genomics of each individual, it is unlikely that this approach will be adopted. Before many of the tests described above become commonly used, researchers also need to demonstrate that these test can provide benefit when guiding treatment options, and if this approach ultimately increases the survival and prevents recurrence of cancers in patients.
