= Monogram Biosciences =

International biotechnology laboratory located in United States

Monogram Biosciences, Inc.
- Formerly: ViroLogic Inc.
- Type: Subsidiary
- Traded as: Nasdaq: MGRM
- Industry: Biotechnology
- Headquarters: South San Francisco, California
- Products: PhenoSense, PhenoSense GT, Trofile, GeneSeq, VeraTag, HERmark
- Number of employees: 379 (2008)
- Parent: LabCorp
- Website: www.monogrambio.com

Monogram Biosciences, Inc. (formerly ViroLogic Inc.) is an international biotechnology laboratory located in South San Francisco, California, USA and is a subsidiary of LabCorp. Monogram develops and markets assays to help guide and improve the treatment of infectious diseases (including HIV and Hepatitis) and cancer.

Virologic was founded in 1996 by Daniel Capon, Ph.D., Martin Goldstein and Robert S. Capon. The company went public (NASDAQ: VLGC) in 2000.

Monogram was acquired by Laboratory Corporation of America in June 2009.

== History ==
=== Foundation and early years ===
The company was founded in 1995 as ViroLogic, Inc., and was incorporated in Delaware in November of that year, commencing commercial operations in 1999.

Its first product was PhenoSense HIV, a phenotypic test measuring the resistance of a patient's virus to antiviral drugs so as to assist in the choice of treatment. The method was described in Antimicrobial Agents and Chemotherapy in 2000. Active marketing began in November 1999, with sales representatives calling on physicians across the United States from 15 November.

A preliminary prospectus for a flotation of up to $75 million was filed with the Securities and Exchange Commission on 22 February 2000, the proceeds being intended for sales and marketing and for expansion of the firm's clinical laboratory. CIBC World Markets acted as lead manager, with ING Barings and Prudential Vector Healthcare Group as co-managers. The company went public later that year.

A comparison published in 2004 by researchers unconnected with either manufacturer found only weak agreement between PhenoSense and Virco's rival Antivirogram assay in predicting reduced susceptibility to antiretroviral drugs.

=== Merger with ACLARA and change of name ===
In 2004 ViroLogic agreed to merge with ACLARA BioSciences, Inc., a company based in Mountain View, California, each ACLARA share being exchangeable for 1.7 ViroLogic shares together with 1.7 contingent value rights (CVRs), under which a further cash payment would fall due should the ViroLogic share price fail to reach a specified level. Existing ViroLogic holders were expected to retain approximately 52 per cent of the enlarged company and ACLARA holders approximately 48 per cent, and ACLARA's operations were to be moved to South San Francisco after completion. The terms were amended on 18 October 2004, leaving the exchange ratio unchanged but providing for a payment of up to $0.88 per CVR eighteen months after the merger took effect. The merger was completed on 10 December 2004, in a transaction worth about $180 million, and brought with it the eTag system, a protein-based technology able to test biopsy-sized samples of patient tumours.

The company took the name Monogram Biosciences, Inc. on 6 September 2005, stating that the change was meant to reflect a commitment to extend its work in individual medicine beyond viral disease into oncology and other serious illnesses. Chief financial officer Alfred Merriweather said that the former name had somewhat restricted the company's focus to viral disease.

The CVR liability arising from the merger fell due in June 2006. As at 31 March 2006, the maximum amount payable was $57 million, of which $32.4 million was payable in cash and the remainder in cash or shares, the sum being determined by the volume-weighted average share price over the fifteen trading days from 19 May to 9 June.

=== Collaboration with Pfizer ===
Pfizer and ViroLogic first worked together in 2002, when the latter became Pfizer's preferred supplier of HIV resistance testing technology and services in support of its HIV development programmes. In May 2006 the two entered into a non-exclusive collaboration agreement under which Pfizer took a global licence to the co-receptor tropism assay for the clinical development of its CCR5 antagonist maraviroc, and invested $25 million through a 3 per cent senior secured convertible note repayable in May 2010, the conversion price being set at a 20 per cent premium to the average closing share price over a defined period.

Pfizer had used the assay to select patients for enrolment in its trials of the drug, marketed as Selzentry, and the agreement allowed the test to be made available to patients worldwide. Revenue from the assay in connection with Selzentry exceeded $16 million in 2008.

=== Recapitalisation and acquisition by LabCorp ===
In January 2007, the company issued $30 million in principal amount of zero-coupon convertible senior unsecured notes due in 2026, for an aggregate purchase price of approximately $22.5 million. Merriweather said the investment gave the company greater flexibility in meeting the CVR liability falling due the following month. The shares rose by 36 per cent, or 61 cents, to close at $2.30 on the day of the announcement. On 27 October 2008 the board approved a six-to-one reverse share split, which took effect on 4 November and reduced the number of shares issuable on conversion of the notes and on exercise of options and warrants.

On 23 June 2009 Laboratory Corporation of America announced an agreement to acquire the company by means of an all-cash tender offer of $4.55 per share, implying an equity value of about $106.7 million and an enterprise value of about $155 million including net indebtedness, with completion expected in the third quarter of that year. The enterprise value was calculated on approximately 23.5 million fully diluted shares outstanding, and the offer was approved unanimously by the board. The transaction was to be carried out through an acquisition subsidiary, Mastiff Acquisition Corp.

The offer represented a substantial premium over the closing price of $1.68 on 22 June, the day before the announcement; the shares rose by 168 per cent in early trading the following day and closed at $4.52. Merriweather said in correspondence with Pharmacogenomics Reporter that the transaction had not arisen from any search for offers on the company's part, and that LabCorp had made the approach.

== Products ==
=== HIV and infectious disease testing ===
The company's range of drug-resistance tests included PhenoSense HIV, GeneSeq and PhenoSense GT. PhenoSense and PhenoSense GT measured the resistance of an individual patient's virus so that treatment could be tailored accordingly, while the Trofile assay identified patients eligible for the CCR5 class of HIV drugs and was widely adopted as the companion diagnostic for Selzentry. A further test, PhenoSense HIV Integrase, designed to detect susceptibility to the then new class of integrase inhibitors, was introduced in August 2008.

Tropism testing established the route by which a patient's virus entered CD4 cells, a distinction that mattered because CCR5 antagonists such as maraviroc and vicriviroc are effective only against R5-tropic strains, and are of less benefit to patients carrying X4-tropic or dual-tropic virus or a mixture of strains. Trofile was later described in the literature as the prospectively validated tropism assay of the period, its use nonetheless being limited by cost, by the time taken to return a result, and by an inability to test patients with very low or undetectable viraemia.

In 2008, the original assay was withdrawn and replaced in clinical practice by a version of enhanced sensitivity, with a nominal detection limit of 0.3 per cent for CXCR4-using virus; both versions required a viral load of at least 1,000 copies per millilitre for reliable amplification. The company stated that the modifications had increased sensitivity thirtyfold.

Two retrospective reanalyses of stored samples were presented at the Interscience Conference on Antimicrobial Agents and Chemotherapy in October 2008. In the ACTG 5211 study of vicriviroc, the enhanced assay identified a further 25 of 114 participants, or 22 per cent, as carrying dual- or mixed-tropic virus at screening, while in the MERIT study of maraviroc an additional 106 of 721 participants, or 15 per cent, would have been excluded, the more stringent screening narrowing the pool of eligible patients by between 15 and 22 per cent overall. In the original MERIT analysis at 48 weeks, 65 per cent of those receiving maraviroc had a viral load below 50 copies per millilitre against 69 per cent of those receiving efavirenz, a result that fell just short of the trial's threshold for non-inferiority, whereas among patients selected by the enhanced assay the figure was 68 per cent in both arms. The company reported that Pfizer had met the endpoint on retesting and that this raised the possibility of an expanded label following submission to and approval by the Food and Drug Administration.

Reporting of the two presentations noted that no prospective evaluation of the enhanced assay had been carried out, that the resulting gains in virological response were modest and in the vicriviroc reanalysis not statistically significant, and that a more sensitive and therefore more restrictive test can only screen further candidates away from treatment rather than improve the outcome of any individual patient. Delegates raised the possibility that patients excluded on the basis of very small dual- or mixed-tropic populations might have fared nearly as well as those who completed the trials, and the conclusion drawn was that tropism results should be interpreted with expert judgement, as was already the practice with resistance testing.

=== Oncology testing ===
The oncology business rested on VeraTag, a proximity-based platform for quantitatively measuring proteins and functional protein complexes, designed to run on standard formalin-fixed paraffin-embedded samples. The first product on the platform was HERmark, a test quantifying HER2 expression and dimerisation in breast cancer; it was the first assay on the platform validated under the Clinical Laboratory Improvement Amendments, several other cancer tests then under development remaining restricted to research use.

Preliminary findings were presented by the company at the thirtieth San Antonio Breast Cancer Symposium in December 2007. Tissue was analysed from patients with metastatic breast cancer who had been selected for treatment with trastuzumab by centralised immunohistochemical testing; according to the company, patients with higher measured HER2 expression showed an objective response rate of 59 per cent against 18 per cent among those with lower expression, and a median time to progression of 12.8 months against four months. In multivariate Cox proportional hazards models, HER2 expression and HER2:HER2 dimer levels as measured by the assay were statistically significant predictors of time to progression. The company also reported confirmation from the College of American Pathologists that the assays were approved for routine patient testing in its CLIA-certified reference laboratory. C. Kent Osborne of the Baylor College of Medicine described the concept underlying the technology as important, observing that HER2 must partner another member of the HER family in order to activate its pathways.

Further clinical data from a study led by Allan Lipton of the Hershey Medical Center at Penn State University were presented at the annual meeting of the American Society of Clinical Oncology in May 2008 and again at San Antonio that December. The list price of HERmark stood at $3,350 in early 2009, when the company intended to follow a cohort of 500 patients with the Dana-Farber Cancer Institute in order to confirm the earlier results, and to validate additional markers measurable on the platform, among them total HER1 and HER3 protein, several receptor dimers, the HER3:PI3K signalling complex and p95, a proteolytically truncated form of the HER2 protein. An assay measuring activated c-Met had also been developed.
