= Classmates.com =

Social networking service

classmates.com
- Website type: Social networking service
- Available in: English language
- Founded: Randy Conrads
- Country of origin: United States
- Owners: PeopleConnect, Inc.
- Creator: Tabitha Britt
- Website: www.classmates.com
- Commercial: Mixed
- Registration: Optional but required for certain visit Classmates.com, provide your basic personal details (such as your name and graduation year), and link your account to your specific high school
- Launched: November 17, 1995; 30 years ago (as Classmates Online, Inc.)
- Current status: Active
- Content license: CC Attribution / Share-Alike 3.0; Royalty-free, worldwide, transferable, and non-exclusive license.
- Written in: Java platform

classmates.com is an American social networking service. It was founded on November 17, 1995 by Randy Conrads as Classmates Online, Inc. and headquartered in Bellevue, Washington. It bills itself as the leading online social network service in the United States for bringing high school alumni together, with over 90 million members.

Classmates.com has an archive of over 470,000 old high school yearbooks that have been digitized. Members can also purchase yearbook reprints. Other features of the site include private messaging, conversations, class lists and reunion planning.

== History ==
In 2004, United Online acquired Classmates.com and owned and operated the company as part of its Classmates Media Corporation subsidiary until 2015.

In 2006, United Online acquired Opobox, Inc. d.b.a. Names Database, a social networking website founded by Gabriel Weinberg. The acquisition price was approximately $10 million in cash. At the time of acquisition, the company had approximately 50,000 paying subscribers and was expected to generate less than $1 million in revenue for that year. United Online CEO Mark Goldston described the acquisition as "a great addition to Classmates.com" that would further the company’s "overall mission of connecting people."

In 2010, Classmates.com rebranded to Memory Lane, which included a website redesign, and included content like movie trailers, songs, and photos. In 2011, Classmates dropped the Memory Lane brand. Classmates Media operated online social networking and loyalty marketing services under the Classmates.com and MyPoints brands, respectively.

In August 2015, Classmates was acquired by PeopleConnect Holdings, Inc., a portfolio company established that same year by H.I.G. Capital. This acquisition brought Classmates together with Intelius, another data broker PeopleConnect had acquired previously in July 2015.

In 2020, PeopleConnect completed a merger with The Control Group, a provider of B2C information services located in San Diego, California.

Classmates Media Corporation's business model is based on user-generated content and revenue from paid subscriptions and advertising sales.

As of 2023, under the PeopleConnect leadership team, including CEO Steven Gray & CFO Sach Barot, the B2C information services division of PeopleConnect operates from the San Diego location. The Classmates division, led by President Sarah Howe, is located in Bellevue, Washington.

== Users and ranking among other social networking sites ==
The only time Classmates appeared on Hitwise's top 10 list of social networking websites was in June 2009, when it appeared tenth with a 0.45% market share.

In early 2008, Nielsen Online had ranked Classmates as number three in unique monthly visitors (U.S. home, work) among social networking sites.

As of June 30, 2008, Classmates Media had approximately 3.8 million paying subscribers, reflecting a 41% increase from the previous year.

In 2006, television program The View mentioned Classmates.com as having more than 40 million members in the United States and Canada.

According to the Online Publishers Association Paid Content U.S. Market Spending Report, Classmates.com was Number 4 among the Top 25 Web Destinations Ranked by Consumer Content Revenue in both 2002 and 2003 (the last years that individual site rankings were broken out). As more users have moved to Facebook, the site has fallen in popularity.

In 2015 (the year the company turned 20), Classmates had over 70 million current members.

== Privacy ==
Classmates.com members use real names, not screen names, including maiden names. Member privacy is protected, so email addresses and contact information are never revealed unless self-disclosed by members one-on-one.

== Digital yearbook collection ==
Classmates.com has an archive of over 470,000 yearbooks from the US, with some dating back to the 1880s. This represents the world’s largest digital yearbook collection. Classmates.com acquires these yearbooks and then scans them, creating digital copies that can be viewed online. Many of these yearbooks are available to purchase in hardcover or softcover reprints.

The oldest yearbook on the site is from 1886, from Central High School, Manchester, NH.

== Reunions ==
Classmates.com members can plan and attend reunions on-site. In 2020, Classmates.com also rolled out the virtual reunion feature so that schoolmates can get together without having to travel, which was a new option during the height of the COVID-19 pandemic.

== Legal allegations ==
Five District Attorneys in CA (including LA) filed a consumer protection lawsuit – Classmates updated its subscription renewal disclosures and settled the claim.

=== Email settlement ===
Classmates.com was alleged to have sent emails that told recipients their old friends from school wished to reconnect (and the recipients would need to buy Classmates.com memberships to receive their old friends' contact information). A class action lawsuit was brought against Classmates.com in 2008. The lead plaintiffs in the case were David Catapano and Anthony Michaels. Classmates.com agreed to pay $2.5 million to its users to settle the lawsuit.

=== Piggybacking and post-transaction marketing ===
Classmates.com was accused of piggybacking and post-transaction marketing. Parent company United Online earned $70 million from marketing practices under investigation in 2009 by the Senate Commerce Committee. United Online denied the allegations and maintained that customers were provided clear disclosures before agreeing to transactions.

=== Settlement on hidden online shopping fees ===
On August 18, 2010, New York Attorney General Andrew Cuomo announced a settlement with six companies, including Classmates, as part of a probe into the discount club industry. Classmates was among the retailers that agreed to pay $2.1 million toward refunds and consumer education. Under the alleged practice investigated, consumers who completed online purchases were presented with discounts or cash-back offers, and accepting these offers triggered small, easy-to-overlook recurring charges billed to unfamiliar company names. Classmates' share of the settlement amounts to $960,000 and a commitment to end these practices.

== See also ==
- Names Database, owned by Classmates.com
