= Baby and Child Care =

Baby and Child Care may refer to:

- The Common Sense Book of Baby and Child Care by Dr. Benjamin Spock
- Pediatrics, the branch of medicine that deals with the medical care of infants, children, and adolescents
- Child care, the care and supervision of babies and young children
