= Spoke (disambiguation) =

A spoke is a rod connecting the hub of a wheel with the traction surface.

Spoke or Spokes may also refer to:

- Spokes, the Lothian Cycle Campaign, a UK cycling campaign organisation
- Spokes Canterbury, a New Zealand cycling advocacy organisation
- Spoke (album), a 1997 album by the band Calexico
- Spokes (album), a 2003 album by Plaid
- Radial features in the rings of Saturn

== See also ==
- Spock (disambiguation)
