= Naveen Jain =

Indian-American business executive

Naveen K. Jain
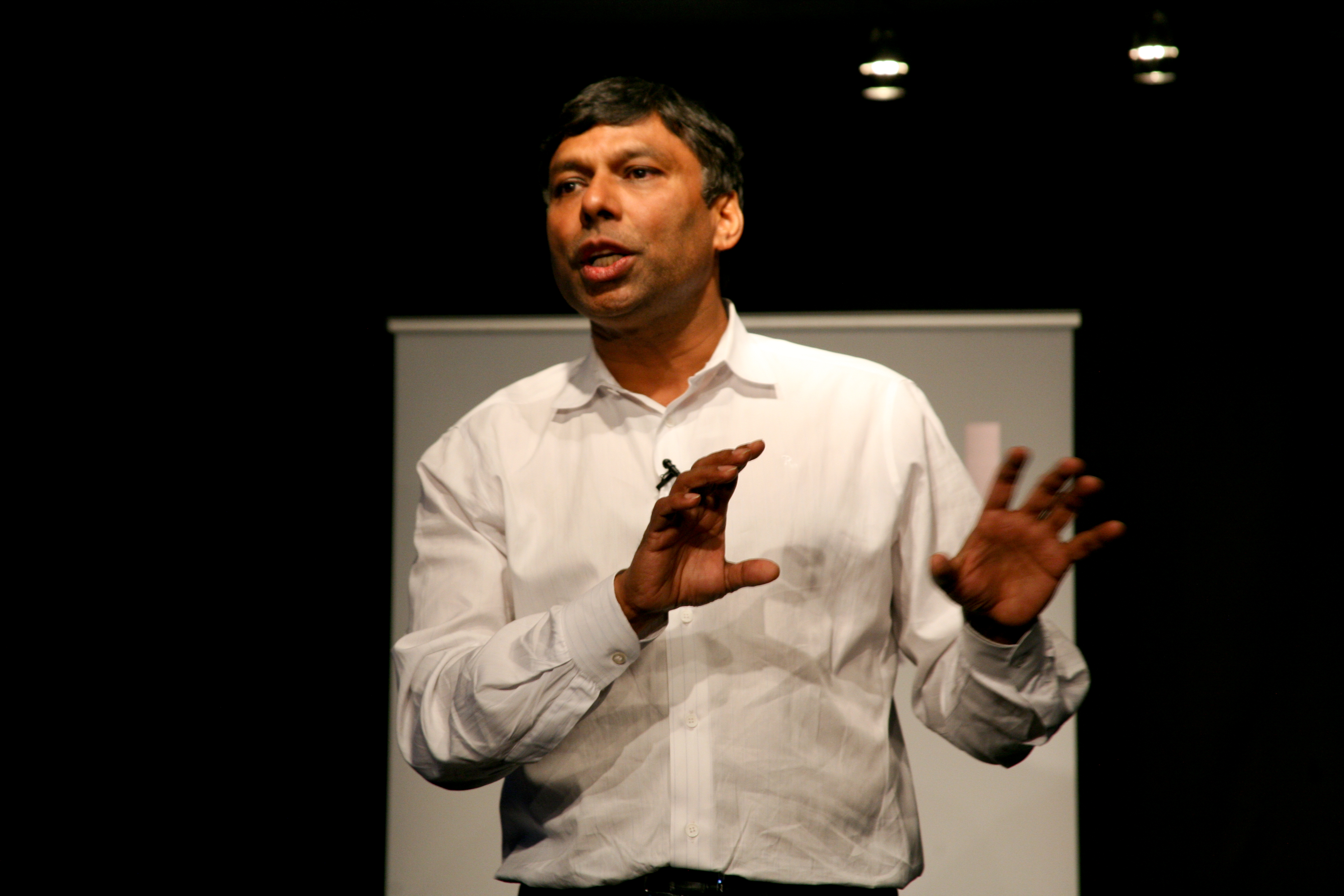
- Jain at Tech Cocktail Week
- Born: 6 September 1959 (age 67); Uttar Pradesh, India
- Education: IIT Roorkee (BE)
- Occupations: Co-founder and Chair of Moon Express; CEO of Viome
- Known for: Founder and former CEO of InfoSpace
- Children: 3, including Ankur Jain
- Website: naveenjain.com

Naveen K. Jain (/nɒˈviːn dʒeɪn/; born 6 September 1959) is an Indian-American business executive, entrepreneur, and the founder and former CEO of InfoSpace. InfoSpace briefly became one of the largest internet companies in the American Northwest, before the crash of the dot-com bubble and a series of lawsuits involving Jain. In 2010 Jain co-founded Moon Express, where he is the executive chairman, and in 2016 founded Viome, where he is the CEO.

== Early life ==
Naveen Jain was born in 1959 to a Jain family. He grew up in New Delhi and in villages in Uttar Pradesh, India.

Jain moved to Roorkee, where in 1979 he earned an engineering degree from IIT Roorkee. He moved to the United States that same year. He looked up to business people who made their own fortune, especially Bill Gates.

== Early career ==
Jain's first job out of college in 1983 was at Burroughs (now known as Unisys) in New Jersey as part of a business-exchange program. He moved to Silicon Valley for its warmer climate and worked for "a bunch of startups" before joining Microsoft in 1989. Jain worked on OS/2, then MS-DOS, Windows NT, and Windows 95. He was awarded three patents related to Windows 95 and became best known for his work as a program manager.

Jain joined the management team for The Microsoft Network (later MSN), prior to its launch. According to Red Herring, he became restless after eight years at the company and said he didn't feel a single person could make a difference at a large company like Microsoft. Naveen Jain was working on the launch of MSN, when Netscape Communications raised $2.2 billion in an initial public offering in 1995. NetScape's IPO was considered the start of the dot-com bubble, because it showed that Internet companies can have large IPOs without making a profit first. Naveen quit Microsoft to start InfoSpace that year, with the aim of having his own initial public offering as quickly as possible.

== InfoSpace ==
=== Growth ===
Jain founded InfoSpace in March 1996 with six employees, mostly from Microsoft, and began developing e-mail and telephone directories. InfoSpace provided content and services, such as phone directories, maps, games and information on the stock market, to websites and mobile device manufacturers. The company grew at low cost without funding using co-branding strategies. It went public on 15 December 1998. The company raised $75 million in the offering.

Jain's net worth grew to $8 billion. He began purchasing expensive homes and yachts. Jain owned 47 percent of InfoSpace's stock. Many lawsuits from partners and employees alleged he used promises of stock options to attract talent and business partners, but then fired employees or broke off relations without providing the promised shares. An investigation by the board found evidence that Jain may have failed to fulfill his contractual promises for stock options to seven former employees and eight business partners. Many of these cases involved employees or consultants that said they were offered deals where they could buy shares for 1 to 10 cents each, but shortly afterwards Jain tried to change the deal or fired them over a dispute without the promised stock-based compensation. Jain alleged the deals were set up such that their shares wouldn't vest until they've been an employee for a year.

=== Crash and fallout ===
As the dot-com bubble ended in March 2000, InfoSpace's stock fell from $138 to $1.56 by July 2001. In March 2000, even as the stock price declined, Jain said InfoSpace would one day have a greater market-share than Microsoft, Intel and Cisco combined. Early the following year he sold $80 million of his own shares at an even lower price. Jain led a merger with Go2Net that was purchased with the shares. Shortly afterwards the founder of Go2Net quit and the company was reduced in size. After the merger, Go2Net CEO Russell Horowitz became president of Infospace. Also, in 2000, InfoSpace used a controversial accounting method to report $46 million in profits when in fact it had lost $282 million. Company executives skirted SEC trading restrictions to sell large blocks of their personal stock.

Jain resumed the role of CEO in 2001. As revenues decreased, Jain indicated to investor analysts that revenues were expected to go up, even though all indicators showed a continued decline. In 2001, InfoSpace said its revenues would go up to $360 million, then laid off 250 staff shortly afterwards. Jain and many other executives sold their shares in the company, just as the stock increased in response to investor analysts repeating Jain's positive outlook on revenues. The company then used misleading accounting practices to make it appear as though it was still growing. For example, it invested money in a company run by Jain's brother, with an agreement that his brother would also spend money on InfoSpace, a practice that was referred to as "buying revenues".

A shareholder filed a lawsuit against InfoSpace and many of its executives, including Jain, in 2001. The shareholder alleged Jain misled shareholders about the company's financials, then profited by selling his own shares at their peak. This led to a series of additional lawsuits and the board dismissed Jain from his CEO position in 2002 in response. Jain was forced out by InfoSpace's board as chairman and CEO in December 2002.

In 2003 Jain was ordered to pay $247 million for violations in "short-swing trading rules", whereby he bought and sold stocks within six months as an employee with insider knowledge. In appeals court the Securities and Exchange Commission submitted a brief taking Jain's side, which led to a settlement for $105 million.

Jain said his stock purchasing was a mistake due to bad advice from his legal and financial advisors. Following the settlement, Jain sued his stock management company and lawyers for alleged negligence in their handling of the case, but lower courts and the Supreme Court dismissed his case.

In March 2003, InfoSpace sued Jain and others for allegedly misappropriating trade secrets from InfoSpace to start Intelius and for violating their non-compete agreement. A court found no evidence that Intelius and Infospace competed with one another and the case was dismissed. In December 2004, an $83 million settlement was reached between InfoSpace and Jain, which would result in dismissal of all the cases, including the one from the shareholder, with prejudice.

== Post-InfoSpace ==
=== Intelius ===
In 2003, Jain co-founded Intelius. The company collected and sold background information on individuals. It grew to $18.1 million in revenues by 2004 and $88.5 million in 2007 with $22.5 million in profits. It filed an initial public offering in 2008. The site was the subject of many consumer complaints concerning post-transaction marketing practices, where consumers were led to believe they were answering a short survey for $10 cash back, but were actually signed up for a $20-per-month subscription. He re-formed the company under the name Inome in 2012. In 2015 the company was sold, with Jain retaining a 25 percent interest, and a new CEO was appointed.

=== TalentWise ===
Jain founded Talentwise, a spin-off from Intelius, which was sold in 2016.

=== Moon Express ===
Jain co-founded Moon Express in August 2010 and is its chairman. The company is building machine-operated spacecraft to mine materials like gold, cobalt, platinum, and Helium-3 (nuclear energy fuel) from the Moon. It will also prospect for water on the Moon's south pole, which could be used to create rocket fuel for missions to Mars and beyond. Jain claimed his target for Moon Express was to found human colonies on the Moon by 2022.

=== Bluedot ===
Jain is founder and CEO of Bluedot. Started in 2015, Bluedot licenses research from United States Department of Energy national labs for commercialization. Jain is founder and CEO of Bluedot's spinoff Viome (founded in 2016). Viome provides nutritional genomics testing and analysis services, especially of the gut flora, and provides dietary advice.

=== Other activities ===
Jain is a member of the board of Kairos Society, a non-profit network of undergraduate entrepreneurs, founded by his son. He is also on the board of the Xprize Foundation and Singularity University. In collaboration with his wife, the Anu and Naveen Jain Women’s Safety Xprize was launched in October 2016 and was intended to run until June 2018, with a goal of awarding $1 million to a team who creates an affordable device that can quickly, automatically, and quietly send an emergency alert to responders.

Jain collects meteorites. His collection, which by 2012 had cost him $5 million, consists of 'witnessed falls'; meteorites that observers have seen moving through the atmosphere.

== Personal life ==
Jain married in 1988 and moved with his family to Seattle. He has three children including Ankur Jain.
