= Spock (surname) =

Spock is a surname, and may refer to:

- Benjamin Spock (1903–1998), American pediatrician and author
- Marjorie Spock (1904–2008), American environmentalist and writer, sister of Benjamin
- Scott Spock, American songwriter, composer and record producer
