= Kairos HQ =

U.S based private company

- Formerly: Kairos Society
- Company type: Private
- Industry: Finance, venture capital, startups
- Founded: 2008; 18 years ago (as Kairos Society)
- Founder: Ankur Jain; Jake Medwell
- Headquarters: New York, United States
- Key people: Ankur Jain and Alex Fiance (Co-CEOs)
- Website: kairoshq.com

Kairos HQ is a U.S based private company that builds products in the housing and healthcare sectors. Founded in 2008 as The Kairos Society by Ankur Jain, it is headquartered in New York City. As of 2023, the firm managed US$300 million to invest in affordable housing and personal health startups.

== History ==
The Kairos Society was launched in 2008 by Ankur Jain and Jake Medwell while Jain was a student at the Wharton Business School.

Some founders from Kairos later founded Periscope, Casper, FiscalNote, and Digital Genius.

In 2017, the Kairos Society re-launched as a venture studio called Kairos HQ, building and investing in companies aligned with its focus areas. Its portfolio includes Rhino, an alternative to security deposits; Little Spoon, a direct-to-consumer baby brand; Cera, a UK-based elderly homecare service; Bilt Rewards, a program that lets renters earn points through rent payments; and Alloy Health, a company focused on menopause support.

The firm spun out an early stage venture fund, K50, which focuses on financial services products at the pre-seed and seed stages.
