= Spock (disambiguation) =

Spock is a fictional character in the Star Trek franchise.

Spock may also refer to:

== People ==
- Spock (surname)
- A metonym for Leonard Nimoy, who played the character Spock
- Tim Duncan (born 1976), a basketball player nicknamed "Mr. Spock" for his stoic demeanor

== Music ==
- S.P.O.C.K, a Swedish synthpop band
- Spock, an accent drum used with tenor drums

== Computing ==
- Spock (website), a search engine for finding people
- Spock (testing framework), for software

== Other uses ==
- 2309 Mr. Spock, an asteroid
- Spock, a windsurfing move

== See also ==
- SPOCK1, a human gene encoding the protein Testican-1
- SPOCK2, a human gene encoding the protein Testican-2
- "Spocking", making Canadian five-dollar note portraits resemble the character Spock
- Spöck (disambiguation)
- Spok, a musician
- Spock's Beard, a progressive rock band
