= Little Spoon =

Direct-to-consumer, subscription-based business

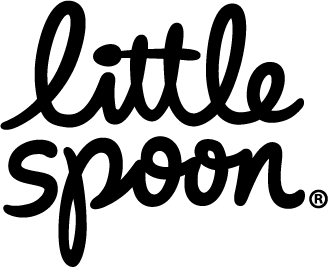
- Trade name: Little Spoon, Inc.
- Industry: Food and beverage
- Founded: 2017
- Founders: Ben Lewis (CEO); Angela Vranich (CPO); Lisa Barnett; Michelle Muller
- Headquarters: New York City
- Website: littlespoon.com

Little Spoon, Inc. is a company that produces and sells food products for infants, toddlers, and children. The New York-based company operates a direct-to-consumer business model and, as of October 2025, distributes products in retail locations nationwide through a partnership with Target. Many of its products are USDA Certified Organic and Clean Label Project certified. The company is led by co-founders Ben Lewis, who is Chief Executive Officer, and Angela Vranich, who is Chief Product Officer.

== History ==
=== Early history (2017–2022) ===
Little Spoon was launched in 2017 by Ben Lewis, Angela Vranich, Michelle Muller, and Lisa Barnett. Lewis and Vranich worked in the food industry and identified an opportunity in the baby food market. Barnett previously worked in venture capital, where she identified an opportunity to modernize the baby food category.

Vranich developed the company’s name and led initial product development, branding, and packaging, while Lewis focused on operations, supply chain, growth and fundraising initiatives. Barnett, who was Chief Marketing Officer and President, worked on marketing, branding, fundraising, and growth efforts, while Muller oversaw customer experience functions.

The company launched as a direct-to-consumer brand with its first product line, Babyblends, a line of fresh baby food. In 2020, it introduced its second product line, Plates, a line of ready-to-heat meals for toddlers and children.

=== 2023–present ===
The company expanded its product offerings to include Biteables, a line of ready-to-eat baby-led weaning meals for toddlers, along with more than 100 products across infant, baby, toddler, and children’s categories. Since its launch, Little Spoon has delivered more than 80 million meals to families in the United States.

In October 2025, Little Spoon launched 23 products across more than 1,800 Target locations in the United States. Inc. reported that Target described the rollout as the largest food and beverage launch in its history. As of late 2025, the company employed 109 people, approximately half of whom worked remotely.

== Safety and transparency ==
In September 2024, Little Spoon adopted safety standards aligned with those of the European Union and established publicly disclosed limits for toxins and contaminants, including heavy metals such as lead, arsenic, cadmium, and mercury. Forbes reported that the company was described as the first U.S. baby food brand to adopt this approach. The company publishes batch-level testing data for certain products on its website.

For its infant formula, the company conducts third-party testing for contaminants and safety indicators, including sulfate-reducing clostridia, a spore-forming bacteria associated with food safety risks.

== Infant formula ==
In March 2026, Little Spoon launched an organic infant formula available direct-to-consumer through its website. Alongside the launch, the company introduced Spoon Fed, an educational content platform with contributions from healthcare professionals.

The formula is certified USDA Organic, EU Organic, Clean Label Project Certified, and Certified Pesticide Free. It uses whole milk sourced from organic grass-fed cows in New Zealand and is manufactured in the United States at an FDA registered facility. The formula is produced using whole milk rather than skim milk. The company states that the formula does not use corn syrup, palm oil, maltodextrin, or genetically modified ingredients. It contains prebiotic FOS, nucleotides, DHA, and ARA.

== Funding ==
In February 2019, Little Spoon secured $7 million in funding led by Vaultier7. In December 2020, the company raised $22 million in a round led by Valor Equity Partners, with participation from Starbucks and other investors. In July 2021, Little Spoon announced a $44 million Series B funding round led by Valor Equity Partners, with participation from Kairos HQ. In February 2023, the company raised additional funding led by Valor Equity Partners at a valuation of approximately $300 million.

== Awards and recognition ==
Little Spoon was included in Time's Best Inventions of 2018. It was ranked No. 91 on Inc.'s Fastest Growing Companies list in 2022. It was also named one of Fast Company's Brands That Matter in 2022. The company was listed among Inc.'s Best Workplaces in 2023 and 2025, and was included in Inc.'s Best in Business list in 2025.
