= Hilda Mason =

American politician (1916–2007)

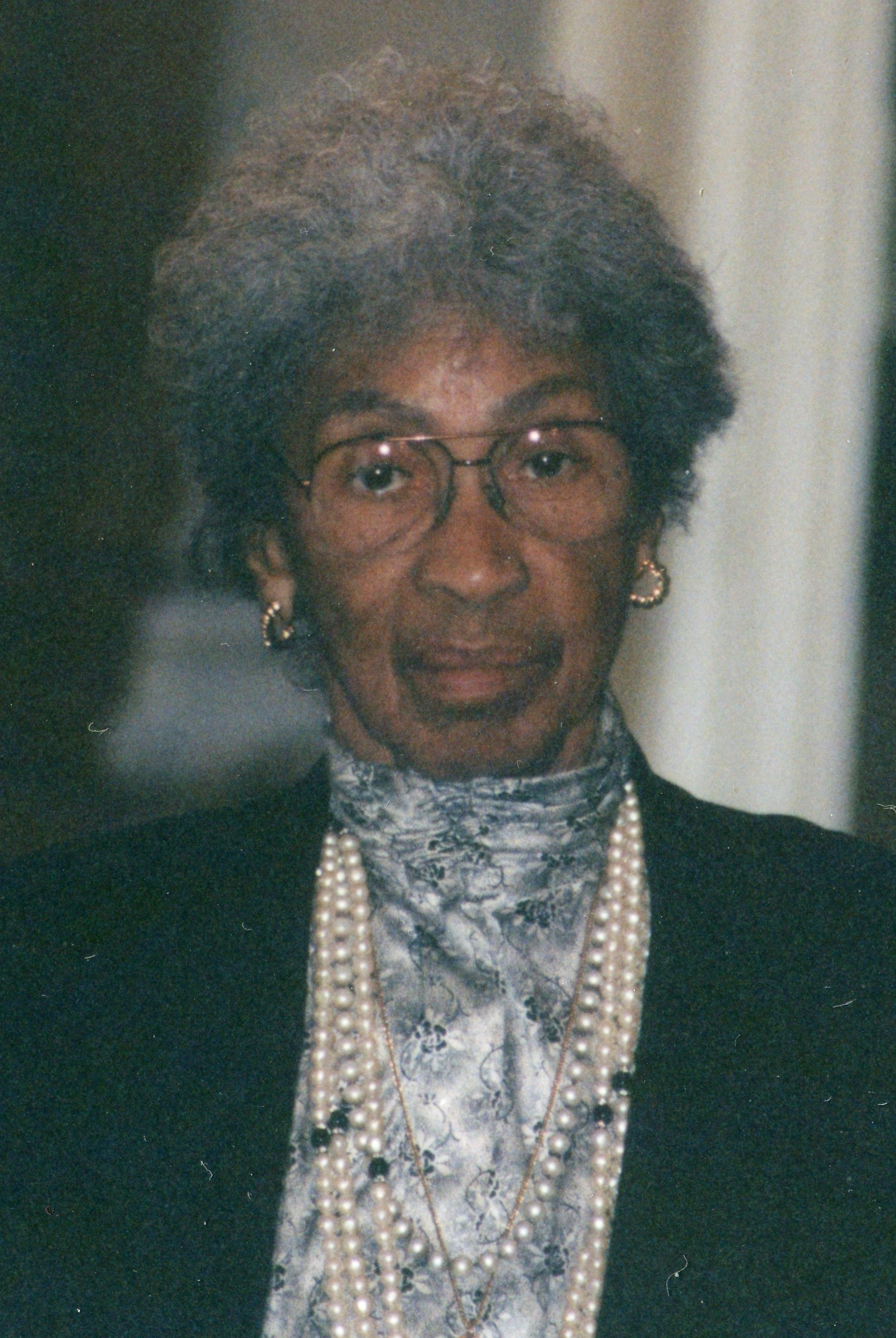
- Mason in 1997

Member of the Council of the District of Columbia from the at-large district
- In office April 2, 1977 – January 2, 1999
- Preceded by: Julius Hobson
- Succeeded by: Phil Mendelson

Personal details
- Born: June 14, 1916 Campbell County, Virginia, U.S.
- Died: December 16, 2007 (aged 91) Washington, D.C., U.S.
- Party: D.C. Statehood

Hilda Mason (June 14, 1916 – December 16, 2007) was an American politician and statehood advocate in Washington, D.C. Mason was a member of the D.C. Statehood Green Party and served as an at-large member of the Council of the District of Columbia from 1977 to 1999, becoming, at the time, the longest-serving elected official in the district's history since the beginning of home rule. Mason was one of a few members of the Democratic Socialists of America to be elected to public office before 2017.

== Life and career ==
A great-granddaughter of enslaved people, Mason was born in a split log cabin in rural Campbell County, Virginia. Mason first worked as a teacher of "colored" students in racially segregated Altavista, Virginia. After moving to Washington, D.C. in 1945, Mason continued to teach in the public schools there which were also still segregated. Mason was a staff member at the LaSalle Laboratory School and the progressive Adams Morgan Community School Project. In 1957, Mason met fellow activist Charlie Mason, a white man who had graduated from Harvard University and Howard University Law School. They married at All Souls Church in 1965; they had two daughters.

Mason was an elected member of the District of Columbia Board of Education from 1972 to 1977 and then was appointed to the D.C. Council to replace Julius Hobson, who died in 1977. Mason's focus while on the council was public education; Mason advocated for the creation of the David A. Clarke School of Law at the University of the District of Columbia. In the mid-1990s, Mason's mental condition came into question; her behavior was "sometimes-erratic and unpredictable". Later in life, Mason began calling herself the "Grandmother to the world". In 1998, she finished third in an at-large race that elected two council members.

== Political career ==
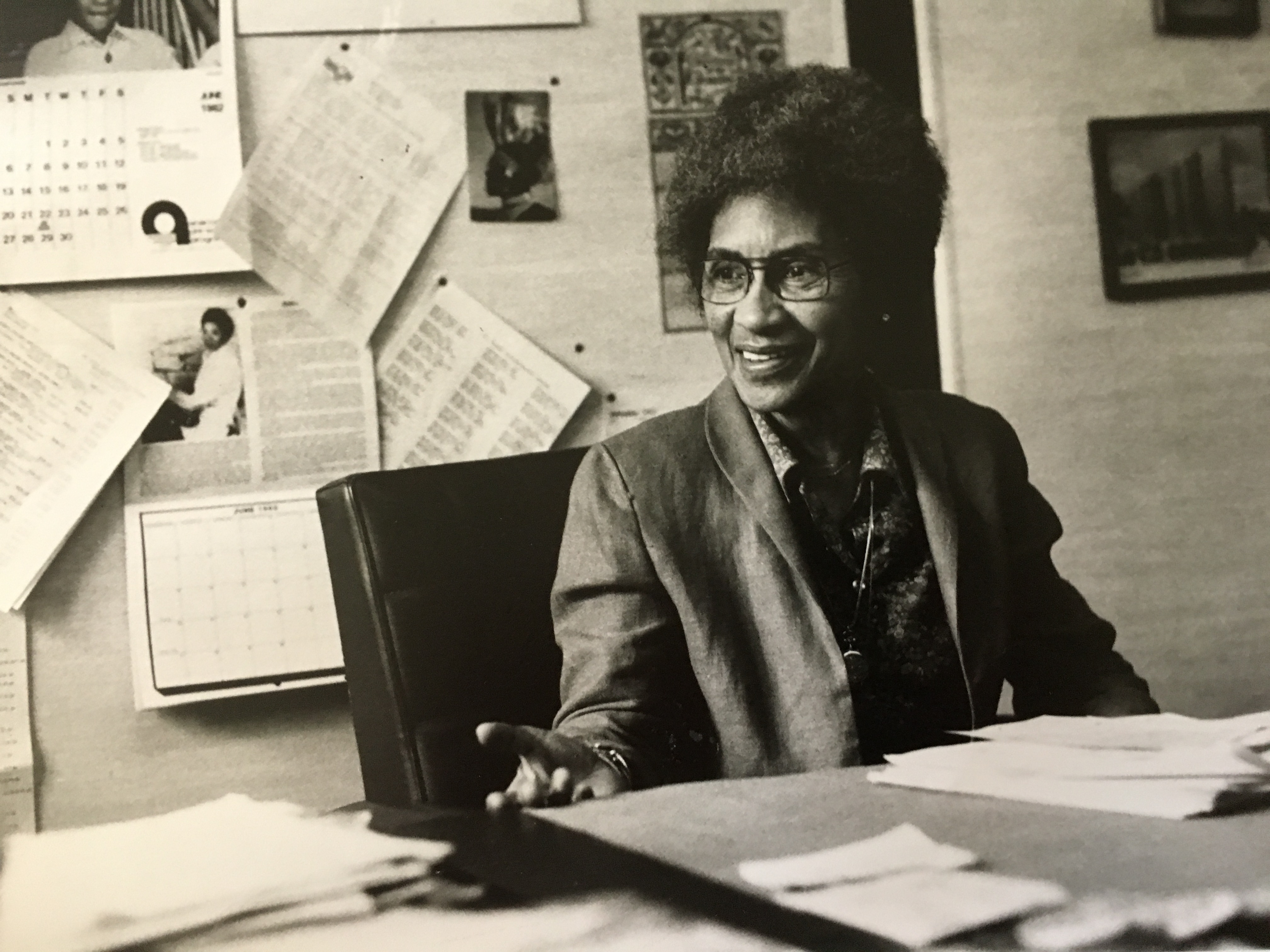
Mason at her Council desk, 1982

- April 2, 1977 — appointed by the D.C. Statehood Party to fill the at-large council seat left vacant by the death of Julius Hobson
- July 19, 1977 – elected at-large council member in special election (narrow win over Barbara Sizemore)
- November 7, 1978 — reelected at-large council member
- November 2, 1982 — reelected at-large council member
- November 4, 1986 — reelected at-large council member
- November 6, 1990 — reelected at-large council member
- November 8, 1994 — reelected at-large council member
- November 3, 1998 — ran for reelection but was defeated in general by Phil Mendelson and David Catania (the at-large race has two winners)

== Activism ==
Mason and her husband were Washington, D.C.'s most significant activist couple from the early 1960s to the 2000s. Before her political career, working as a teacher, she helped organize a school chapter of the Washington Teachers Union. Mason fought for equal treatment for black students and teachers. In the mid-1960s, Mason organized a rent subsidy project and summer enrichment program for children in the neighborhood around All Soul's Church. Mason also picketed the D.C. Transit Company to demand an end to its racist hiring practices and to protest the Whites-only membership policy of the YMCA. After losing her bid for a Council term in 1998, Mason and her husband continued to provide financial assistance to college students. The couple was instrumental in establishing the University of the District of Columbia School of Law and were great patrons of the institution. They contributed large sums to provide scholarships for students attending the school. In 2004, the school Board of Trustees honored them by naming its library the Charles N. and Hilda H. M. Mason Law Library.

== See also ==
- List of Democratic Socialists of America who have held office in the United States
