= Ankur Jain =

American entrepreneur and investor (born 1990)

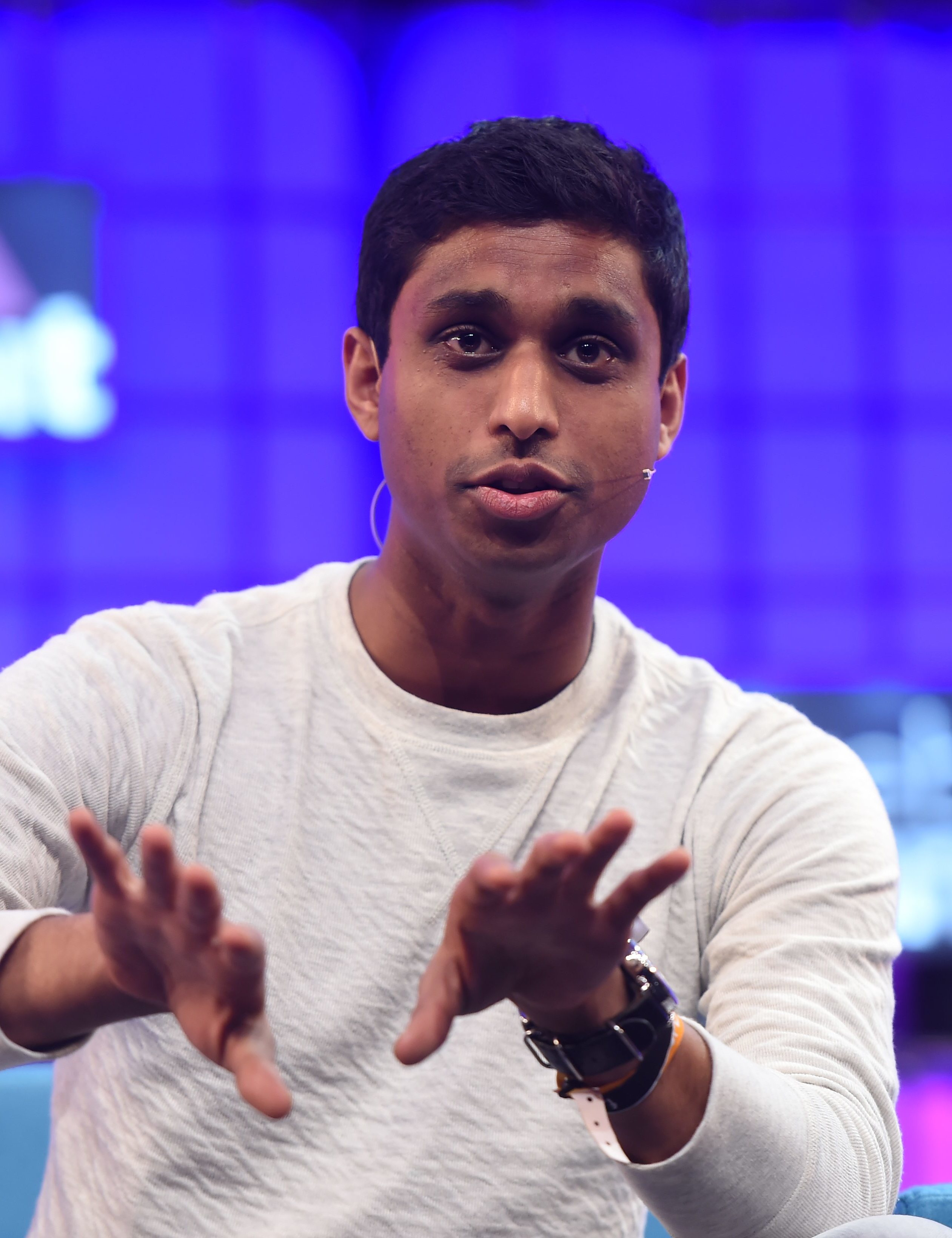
- Ankur Jain in 2024
- Born: 1990 (age 35–36); Bellevue, Washington, US
- Education: Wharton School of the University of Pennsylvania
- Occupations: Founder and CEO of Bilt Rewards
- Employers: Bilt Rewards (founder & CEO); Kairos (founder); Humin (founder & former CEO); Tinder (former VP of product)
- Spouse: Erika Hammond (m. 2024)
- Father: Naveen Jain
- Website: ankurjain.net

Ankur Jain (born c. 1990) is an American entrepreneur and investor who is the founder and CEO of Bilt Rewards, a company that rewards consumers on rent payments. As of August 2025, Forbes estimated his net worth at $3.4 billion.

Previously, he founded an investment firm, Kairos, and a technology company, Humin. After the acquisition of Humin, Jain also served as vice president of product at Tinder.

== Early life and education ==
Ankur Jain was born in Bellevue, Washington, part of the Seattle metropolitan area. He grew up in Redmond, Washington and his parents are Anu and Naveen Jain, both entrepreneurs in the technology industry. By age 11, he had created the website MyOnlineQuiz.com.

Jain attended Wharton School of the University of Pennsylvania.

== Career ==
In 2008, Jain founded the Kairos Society, an incubator for young entrepreneurs. Through Kairos, Jain identified entrepreneurs coming out of universities and worked with them to launch new ventures in areas like healthcare, clean water, global transportation, and education. As of May 2017, companies coming out of the Kairos program had gone on to raise a total of more than $600 million and had a combined value of more than $3 billion. Kairos Society was also named a partner in President Barack Obama's Startup America Partnership.

In 2012, Jain left to become the founder and CEO of Humin, a technology company. The San-Francisco-based startup developed a new address book that organized contacts by contextual cues like where people met, where contacts live, and what they do. Jain raised $15 million for Humin before the company was acquired by Tinder in 2016.

Following the acquisition, Jain stayed on as vice president of product at Tinder. He was rumored to be behind the development of Tinder Select, a version of Tinder for celebrities and public figures.

Jain left Tinder in May 2017 to rejoin Kairos and launch a new venture fund focused on issues such as student debt, affordable housing, child care, and worker retention. Since the fund's announcement, Jain has helped launch a company called Rhino to replace security deposits with a low monthly fee. He has also partnered with UK-based startup, Cera, to bring home care to the elderly.

Jain founded and runs Bilt Rewards out of Kairos in 2021. It is a home rental rewards startup, which raised $200 million from private investors at a $3.1 billion valuation in January 2024. As at July 2025, and following a 2025 primary funding round co-led by General Catalyst and GID which raised $250 million, Bilt is now valued at $10.75 billion.

As of September 2024, Forbes estimated Jain's net worth at $1.2 billion. In 2017, Jain was named a Young Global Leader by the World Economic Forum. He was called "The Best Connected 21-year-old-in the World" by Inc. and named to the 30 under 30 list by Forbes, as well as similar lists by Inc. and The Christian Science Monitor.

== Personal life ==
In April 2024, Jain married former WWE wrestler Erika Hammond in Egypt.
