= Intelius =

American public records business

- Type: Privately held company
- Industry: Information commerce
- Genre: Electronic commerce
- Founded: January 2003
- Founder: Naveen Jain and others
- Headquarters: Seattle, Washington, United States
- Area served: United States
- Key people: Abani Heller, CEO & President
- Services: People Search, Background checks
- Number of employees: Approximately 150
- Parent: PeopleConnect, Inc.
- Website: Intelius.com

Intelius, Inc. is an American public records business headquartered in Seattle, Washington. It provides information services, including people and property search, background checks and reverse phone lookup. Users also have the ability to perform reverse address lookups to find people using Intelius’ services and an address. Intelius, founded by former InfoSpace executives, was started in 2003. It is owned and operated by PeopleConnect, Inc.

== History ==
Intelius was founded in 2003 by six former Infospace executives: Naveen Jain, Kevin Marcus, Niraj Shah, Ed Petersen, Chandan Chauhan and John Arnold. Intelius submitted plans for an initial public offering on January 10, 2008, but withdrew in October 2010.

On December 5, 2006, Intelius acquired Bothell, Washington-based IntelliSense Corporation, a background check, fingerprinting and drug screening company. The acquisition of Intellisense eventually became TalentWise. TalentWise was then spun off to Intelius stockholders in May 2013. On April 30, 2009, Intelius acquired Spock, a people-oriented search engine.

In November 2011, Intelius purchased the Facebook genealogy app Family Builder. In 2012, Intelius was renamed "inome" to serve as the corporate umbrella, and the Intelius name was given to the division focusing on background checks. By 2015, inome was doing business once again as Intelius. On July 1, 2015, Intelius was acquired by private equity firm H.I.G. Capital. As part of the transaction, Abani Heller replaced Jain as the company's CEO. On August 12, 2015, PeopleConnect Holdings Inc., bought the social media business Classmates.com for $30 million. The early social media site Classmates.com was created in 1995 to connect school, work and military colleagues.

== Information services ==
Intelius has created an app available for both Android and iOS that allows users to perform people searches, reverse phone lookups and background check services directly from their mobile device.

PeopleConnect operates four people search websites including Intelius.

== Class action lawsuits ==
On September 30, 2009, before the U.S. District Court for the Central District of California, a class action lawsuit was filed alleging that Intelius automatically enrolled California consumers into programs of its partner, Adaptive Marketing, without permission. The complaint showed evidence as to how the defendants allegedly automatically charged California consumers' credit cards for "memberships" and intentionally frustrated the victims' abilities to dispute the charges.

On October 19, 2009, in the Federal Court in Seattle, Intelius was accused of violating Washington's Consumer Protection Act. In the class action lawsuit Lee v. Intelius Inc., filed by Ohio resident Donovon Lee and Washington resident Bruce Keithly, it was alleged that after purchasing background reports through Intelius, the plaintiffs were each charged recurring $19.95 monthly fees for multiple subscription services which were not requested from both Intelius and its partner, Adaptive Marketing. Plaintiffs sought damages for the Class alleging deceptive practices against Intelius. On March 7, 2013, the United States District Court ruled in favor of the Plaintiff Class. Intelius appealed to the US Court of Appeals (9th Cir.), which on December 16, 2013, also ruled in Lee's [et al.] favor for the Class as follows: "We hold that Lee did not enter into a contract with Adaptive to purchase the Family Safety Report, and did not enter into a contract with Adaptive to arbitrate. We therefore affirm the district court."

After losing this appeal, Intelius sought arbitration with the Plaintiffs and subsequently agreed to two settlements of this lawsuit in favor of the class (one for Mr. Lee and one for Mr. Keithly on different case merits) resulting in a combined $10.5 million settlement for Class Plaintiffs.

== Consumer complaints ==
In 2008 the company discontinued its phone directory services after legal threats and negative press attention focused on allegations that the opt-out process was unreasonably difficult. Among other things, it was also criticized for providing private cell phone numbers.

On September 30, 2009, before the U.S. District Court for the Central District of California, a class action lawsuit was filed alleging that Intelius automatically enrolled California consumers into programs of its partner, Adaptive Marketing, without permission. The complaint showed evidence as to how the defendants allegedly automatically charged California consumers' credit cards for "memberships" and intentionally frustrated the victims' abilities to dispute the charges. On October 19, 2009, in the Federal Court in Seattle, Intelius was accused of violating Washington's Consumer Protection Act.

Intelius received thousands of consumer complaints regarding post-transaction marketing practices and allegedly deceptive credit card charges. The Washington Attorney General sued Intelius, and a $1.3 million settlement was reached in August 2010. In November 2011 the company announced the inclusion of TrueRep to its services. This program allows consumers to provide explanations for any indiscretions on their records.
