= Marjorie Spock =

American writer (1904–2008)

Marjorie Spock (September 8, 1904, New Haven, Connecticut – January 23, 2008, Sullivan, Maine) was an American environmentalist, writer and poet, best known for her influence on Rachel Carson when the latter was writing Silent Spring. Spock was also a noted Waldorf teacher, eurythmist, biodynamic gardener and anthroposophist.

== Life ==
Marjorie Spock was born the second child and the first daughter of six children. Her father Benjamin Spock was the General Solicitor of the New York, New Haven, and Hartford Railroads, Her older brother was Benjamin Spock, the world-renowned pediatrician and author of The Common Sense Book of Baby and Child Care.

In 1922 at the age of 18, Spock decided to leave her formal education with plans of studying at Smith College, to study Eurythmy, and Anthroposophy in Dornach, Switzerland. Spock studied at the Goetheanum where she met and worked with Rudolf Steiner, the founder of anthroposophy. She was present when the Goetheanum burnt by arson and the pivotal "Christmas Conference" of December 25, 1923 – January 1, 1924 when the Anthroposophical Society was founded. Upon joining the Anthroposophical Society, Spock traveled with Steiner on his lecture cycles throughout Europe.

When she returned to the U.S. in 1930, Spock moved to New York to teach at the Rudolf Steiner School. At 38 Spock received her BA and MA degrees from Columbia University, writing her masters thesis on Waldorf education. Upon receiving her degree, she also taught at Dalton Middle School as well as The Fieldston Lower School and The Waldorf School in New York.

Throughout her career, Spock published multiple books, pamphlets and articles about eurythmy and anthroposophy, including "Teaching as a Lively Art", "Eurythmy", and "Fairy Worlds and Workers: A Natural History of Fairyland", as well as traveled and performed with multiple acting troops. She also worked closely with Ehrenfried Pfeiffer within the biodynamic agriculture movement in the U.S.

Following the lawsuit against the government for the aerial spraying of their farm, Spock and her friend Mary Richards, a eurythmist as well, moved to Maine where they continued to practice biodynamic farming. Spock became a mentor to many young farmers wanting to learn methods of growing biodynamic foods, as well as a leader in the development of community building techniques for the Community Techniques Study Group, intended to combat the divide within the Anthroposophical Society.

Spock died on January 23, 2008, Sullivan, Maine where she lived.

== Environmental activism ==
In the late 1950s, Marjorie Spock was a biodynamic gardener on Long Island, New York along with her friend Mary Richards, a digestive invalid with what is referred to as Multiple Chemical Sensitivity, who required a diet of organic and fresh produce.

In the summer of 1957 the state and federal government began a massive aerial spraying over three million hectares of the Northeast, including Spock and Richards's land, with DDT mixed with fuel oil at least fourteen times a day in an attempt to eradicate the Gypsy Moth Disease.

With their crops, soil and livestock destroyed, Spock and Richards joined a pending application for an injunction to stop the US government from aerial spraying with a group of eleven other Long Island plaintiffs, including Robert Cushman Murphy. The initial attempt to hire a lawyer was difficult, as they were often denied on the ground that it was impossible to "win [a case] against the government". However they eventually hired a local attorney who was interested in their devotion to biodynamic farming. Their initial injunction was denied, with the judge claiming the evidence provided did not demonstrate the dangers of DDT. The plaintiffs then brought a lawsuit to the US Federal Court in Brooklyn NY, after amassing more data and expert witnesses. Beginning on February 10, 1958, the suit was brought against the United States Government attempting to permanently halt the federal and state government form spraying their properties, and for damages. For Spock, the concern was for people’s health and the constitutional right for a property owner to manage her land free of government infringement.

The federal judge dismissed 72 uncontested admissions for the plaintiffs and denied their petition. After three years of exhausting all legal appeals the case reached the U.S. Supreme Court in 1960, however it was declined on a technicality. The plaintiffs lost the case but won the right to enjoin the government, prior to a potentially destructive environmental activity, to provide a full scientific review of the proposed action. With this right to environmental review, Spock helped give rise to the environmental movement. This case is often cited as the first modern environmental case brought by citizens.

Throughout the three-year process, Spock wrote daily reports on the trials, and sent them to interested and influential friends of the case's progress. Rachel Carson heard of Spock's case and soon got the daily reports. Carson used the testimony from the experts that Spock had found in her own research. Spock's case, along with a massive bird kill on Cape Cod, provided the impetus for Carson's book, Silent Spring., which is often noted for its role as a catalyst for the congressional hearings which banned the use of DDT in the United States.

== Publications ==
=== Books ===
- Teaching as a Lively Art
- In Celebration of the Human Heart
- Eurythmy
- To Look on Earth With More Than Mortal Eyes
- Fairy Worlds and Workers: A Natural History of Fairyland

=== Pamphlets ===
These two pamphlets have had a broad readership.

- Group Moral Artistry I: Reflections on Community Building
- Group Moral Artistry II: The Art of Goethean Conversation

=== Article ===
- A B C D E F G: The Secret Life of Letters
