= Solé Bicycles =

Bicycle company

- Industry: Bicycle manufacturer
- Founded: 2010; 16 years ago
- Founders: Jonathan Ross Shriftman and Jake Medwell
- Headquarters: Venice, CA, United States
- Website: www.solebicycles.com

Solé Bicycles was founded in 2010, by University of Southern California students, Jonathan Ross Shriftman, Jacob Medwell. In 2011 other founding partners from USC; Brian Ruben, & Chapman University Students; Jimmy Standley, and Ben Petraglia, joined the team to help launch the project. Solé is a manufacturer and dealer of fixed gear/single speed bicycles, City Bikes, Dutch Step Through Bikes, & Beach Cruisers . Within the first year, Solé and its founders received recognition as Entrepreneur Magazine's "Top Five College Entrepreneurs" and a grant from Alibaba Group as the "Third Ranked Newpreneur of the Year". The bikes are sold primarily online. Solé also has select retail locations, one in Venice Beach California, and the other is located on the University of Southern California Campus. The bikes are semi-customizable and offer brand name components from Oury, WellGo, and others.
