= 1972 People's National Convention =

- 1972 presidential election
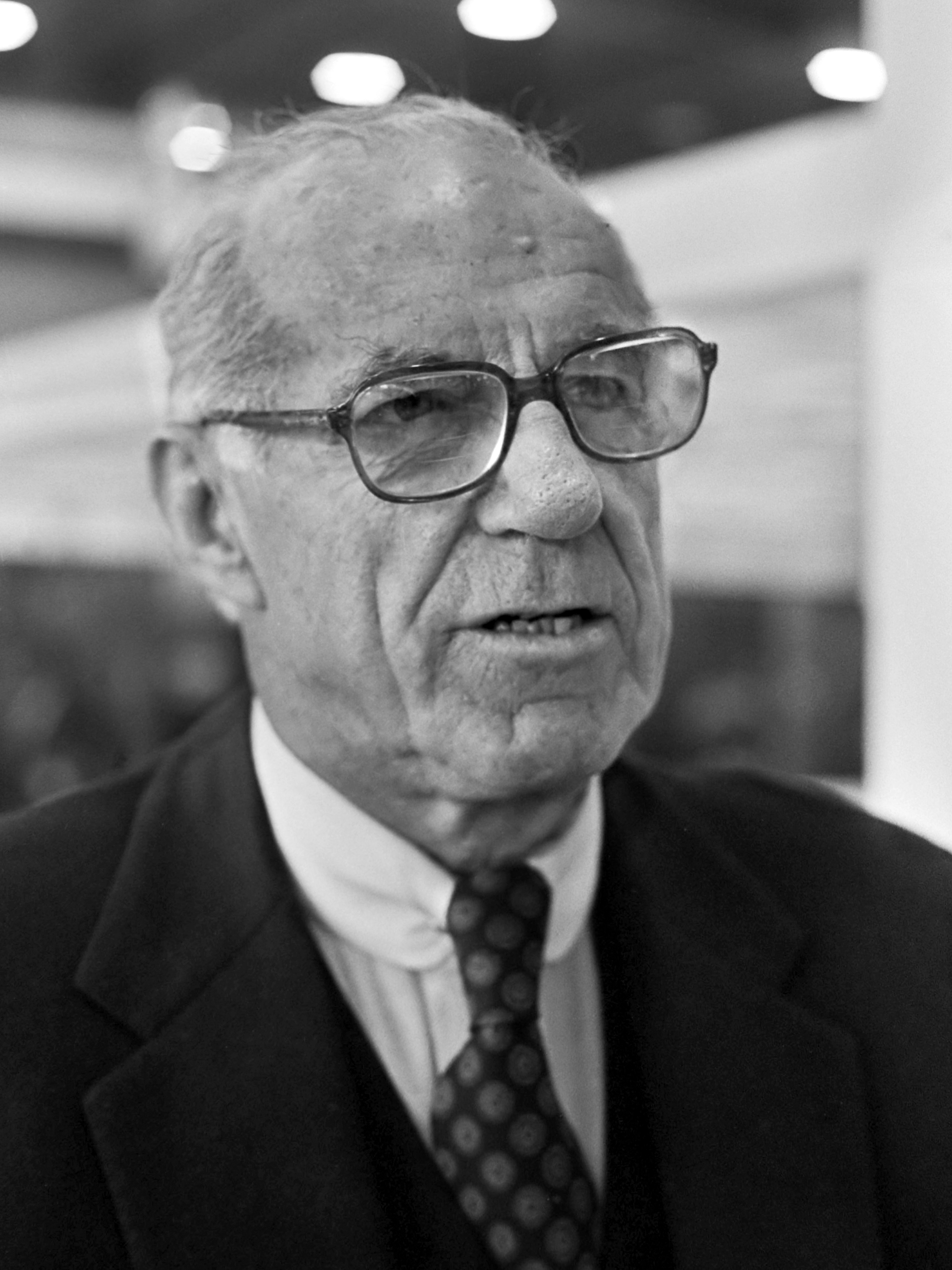
- Presidential nominee (Spock)

Convention
- Date(s): July 27–30, 1972
- City: St. Louis, Missouri
- Venue: St. Louis Gateway Hotel

Candidates
- Presidential nominee: Benjamin Spock of California
- Vice-presidential nominee: Julius Hobson of Washington, D.C.

The 1972 People's National Convention was held July 26–30, 1972 at the St. Louis Gateway Hotel in St. Louis, Missouri. The party nominated Benjamin Spock for president and Julius Hobson for vice president, affirming the provisional nominations they had been given at the party's founding convention in November 1971. In doing so, the party defeated efforts by some delegates to have the party co-nominate Democratic nominee George McGovern in an act of electoral fusion. Proponents of that unsuccessful effort argued that the left-wing should unite in casting a tactical vote to prevent the re-election of incumbent Republican president Richard Nixon.

== Background ==
The People's Party had been founded in 1971 as a coalition of several autonomous national, state and local parties. At its organizational meeting (held July 1971 in Albuquerque, New Mexico), it was described by its national campaign director, Jim McClellan, as, "a loose coalition of autonomous, radical, non-secretariat parties". The party's electoral goal was to provide a radical alternative to the United States' two major parties (the Democratic and Republican) parties). The People's Party was ideologically radical, socialist, and left-wing. The key member parties of the People's Party included the then-national Peace and Freedom Party, the local (Ann Arbor-based) Human Rights Party, and the Vermont state Liberty Union Party (today known as the "Green Mountain Peace and Justice Party").

The party was more formally established in November 1971, when it held a founding convention in Dallas. At that convention, the party named a provisional ticket for the 1972 United States presidential election, provisionally designating Benjamin Spock (author and activist) to be its presidential nominee, and Julius Hobson (activist and member of the District of Columbia Council) to be its vice presidential nominee.

== Logistics ==
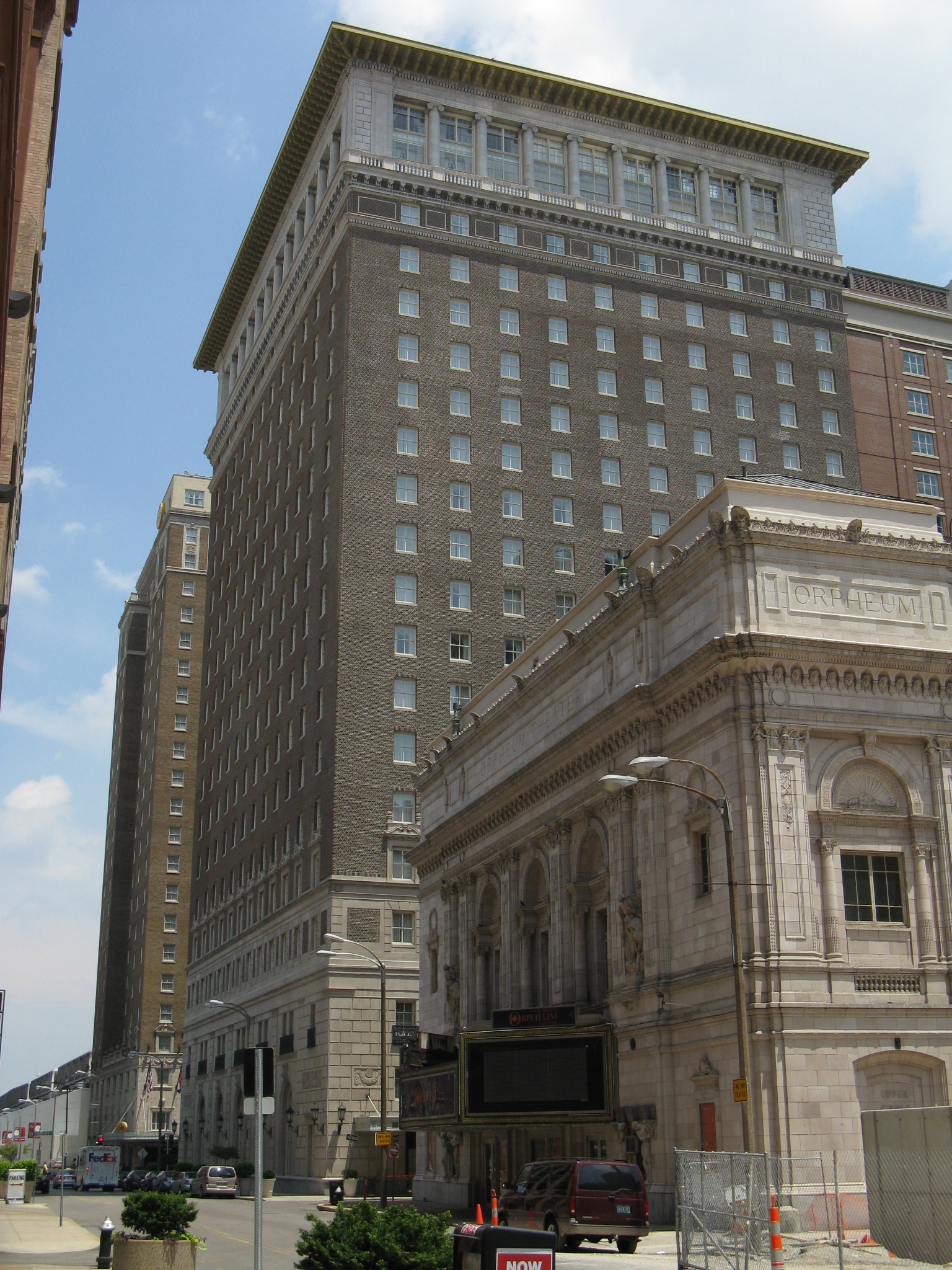
St. Louis Gateway Hotel, venue of the convention

The People Party's 1972 convention was organized by the St. Louis chapter of the Peace and Freedom Party, and was held July 26–30, 1972 at the St. Louis Gateway Hotel in St. Louis, Missouri. The convention featured approximately 200 delegates.

Convention proceedings included the formal nomination of its presidential ticket, the adoption of a party platform, committee meetings, as well as various other meetings and presentations. The most publicized aspect of the convention was the nomination of its ticket for the 1972 United States presidential election.

== Committee and caucus meetings ==
The convention featured dedicated committees on governance, foreign policy, healthcare, politics, labor, economics, ageism, sexism, and racism.

The convention admitted child delegates that were allowed to serve in meetings of its Children's Liberation Caucus, an embodiment of the party's view that anyone should be able to participate in its convention regardless of their age.

== Presidential and vice presidential nominations ==
While they had already been provisionally selected as the party's nominee's in November 1971, the convention saw Spock and Hobson officially nominated as the party's presidential and vice presidential nominees.

Whether the party should proceed with its own presidential nomination was a point of contention among delegates. There was no serious expectation by those at the convention that Spock could win the 1972 presidential election, and some delegates contended that the party's focus should not be running its own ticket and should instead be focusing foremost on bringing attention to the causes they support. Such delegates believed that instead of running its own ticket in the general election, the party should focus on lobbying Democratic Party presidential nominee George McGovern to abandon efforts to brand himself a centrist and to instead throw his support behind more left-wing positions.

Some delegates argued that the party's members should all vote for McGovern in the general election as a tactical vote to prevent the re-election of Republican incumbent president Richard Nixon. Other delegates contended that the party's membership should condition any potential support, and other delegates argued that the party's members should outright refuse to vote for McGovern regardless of any overtures he might offer to earn their vote.

An unsuccessful effort was made by some delegates to have the party abandon its provisional Spock–Hobson, and instead nominate McGovern as its presidential nominee (electoral fusion), in order to unite left-wing votes against Nixon's re-election. However, the prevailing position among delegates was that McGovern could not be expected to adopt the People's Party's platform and that it would therefore be counter-productive to make him its nominee. Disagreement over whether or not the party should support McGovern motivated delegates from the state of Kentucky to walk out of the convention early.

After receiving the party's nomination, Spock acknowledged that he would not stand a chance of winning the presidency in the election, remarking, "That's not our purpose. We're out to build a grassroots movement. Our national campaign is not to see how many votes we can get, but to call attention to our local movements and inspire some to join us there."

== Platform ==
Delegates adopted a policy platform which advocated for:

- Universal healthcare, with free medical care offered as a human right
- Medical equity
  - Reproductive rights (legalization of abortion)
  - Abolition of racial disparities in healthcare)
- Opposition to discrimination (including to ageism, racism, gender discrimination, and discrimination on the basis of sexuality)
- Legalization of cannabis
- Labor rights
  - The right to unionize
  - A shorter workweek
  - A guaranteed minimum wage
  - A government allowance in the amount of $6,500 for families of four
- Economic justice
  - Elimination of corporate loopholes
- Pacifist stance of foreign policy
  - Peace in Vietnam (ending the Vietnam War)
  - Immediate withdrawal of American troops from all foreign countries
  - Granting amnesty to Vietnam War resisters (draft evaders)

== Aftermath ==
The party saw marginal success as a third party in 1972. The party was only able to gain full ballot access for Spock in ten states, rendering a mere write-in candidate in most states. This lack of ballot access was a barrier to his performance in the election.

Vice presidential nominee Hobson was terminally ill with cancer, and thus was unable to actively campaign for the ticket.
