= Julius Hobson =

American activist and politician (1922–1977)

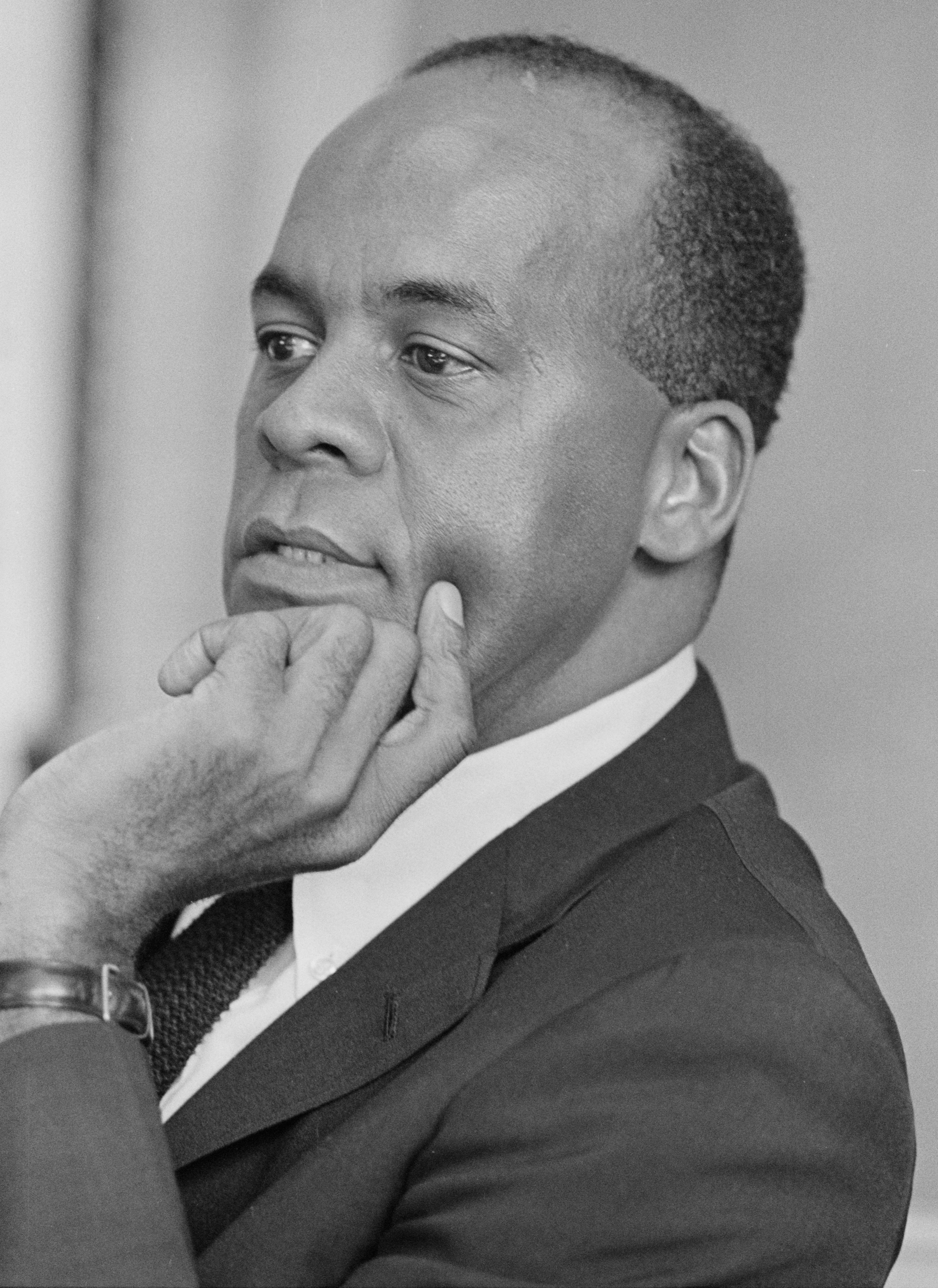
- Hobson in 1967

Member of the Council of the District of Columbia from the at-large district
- In office January 2, 1975 – March 23, 1977
- Preceded by: Position established
- Succeeded by: Hilda Mason

Personal details
- Born: Julius Wilson Hobson; May 29, 1922 Birmingham, Alabama, U.S.
- Died: March 24, 1977 (aged 54) Washington, D.C., U.S.
- Party: D.C. Statehood
- Spouses: Carol Smith (m. 1947; div. 1966); Tina Hobson (m. 1966)
- Children: 4, including 2 stepsons
- Education: Tuskegee University (BA); Columbia University (attended); Howard University (MA)

Military service
- Branch/service: United States Army
- Battles/wars: World War II
- Awards: Bronze Star Medal (3)

Julius Wilson Hobson (May 29, 1922 – March 23, 1977) was an American activist and politician. He served on the Council of the District of Columbia and the District of Columbia Board of Education.

== Early life ==
Julius Wilson Hobson was born on May 29, 1922, in Birmingham, Alabama. He was the son of Irma (Gordon) and Julius Hobson. His mother was a schoolteacher and later a principal. His father died when he was a very young child. His mother remarried a man who had a dry-cleaning plant and a drugstore.

As a child, Hobson worked at a public library, where he could clean the floors, but he was not allowed to borrow books. He read a lot of books about abolitionist John Brown, who he said was the greatest and most under-appreciated American in history. He graduated from Industrial High School, the only public high school in Birmingham that allowed black children to attend.

While attending Tuskegee Institute, he was called away from his studies due to World War II. During the war, he served in the United States Army in Europe. He was awarded three bronze stars for his many piloting missions.

After returning from the war, Hobson graduated from Tuskegee Institute. After graduation, he moved to Harlem and attended Columbia University. He did not learn well from the lecture-style classes, and he left after a few months. In 1946, he moved to Washington, D.C. to attend graduate school in economics at Howard University. He particularly loved the visiting professors and the small classroom sizes at Howard.

For his first job after graduation, he worked as a researcher for the Library of Congress. He wrote papers on economic theory for Congress. After about six years, he changed jobs and worked at the Social Security Administration.

== Activism ==
Walking his son to school, past the all-white school to Slowe Elementary School in Northeast, Washington, D.C., gave Hobson the drive to fight for school desegregation. He was elected president of the school's parent-teacher association, and he argued that overcrowding at black schools would be alleviated if white schools were to admit black students.

During the 1960s, Hobson served as the chair of the Washington chapter of the Congress of Racial Equality. While a part of the organization, he led several sit-ins. Hobson later joined a local civic association, where he marched the streets of Downtown, Washington, D.C., with signs encouraging shoppers to boycott stores that would not hire black employees. When Hobson threatened to encourage a boycott of the city's bus system because the system would not employ black drivers, the bus system backed down and hired 44 black employees. The group helped desegregate restaurants in Maryland and Delaware, ended discrimination in public housing in the District of Columbia and forced private businesses to open employment to black people. He practiced non-violence, although he would say he did not go around saying he was non-violent because violence was never his intention.

When the Congress of Racial Equality expelled him from the organization for being too authoritative, Hobson and his closest associates formed a new civil rights organization, Associated Community Teams.

When Hobson's ten-year-old daughter Jean was assigned the lowest educational track, Hobson sued the public school system. In the case of Hobson v. Hansen, he displayed many charts for the court as evidence that the District spent more on each white student than on each black student. The court ruled in his favor, banning discrimination in the District of Columbia Public Schools and stopping its system of grouping students by ability on June 19, 1967.

Hobson was elected to an at-large seat on the District of Columbia State Board of Education from 1968 to 1969, succeeded by Bardyl Tirana. He decided to run again for a seat representing Ward 2 the next year, but he lost the race to Evie Mae Washington.

In an effort to protest the employment discrimination practiced by Pepco, Hobson distributed stamps that were intended to be pasted on check payments sent to Pepco that would prevent Pepco's computers from processing the checks. He was later ordered by court to stop distributing the stamps.

In 1969, Hobson founded the Washington Institute for Quality Education, a nonprofit organization dedicated to ending discrimination in schools.

Hobson taught a class at American University on social problems and the legal system. His students researched whether the legal system could be a recourse to remedy problems in society.

The D.C. Statehood Party was founded to convince Hobson to run under the party for District's delegate to the United States House of Representatives. Hobson announced his candidacy under the Statehood Party on January 15, 1971. He lost to Democrat Walter E. Fauntroy. Hobson was elected in 1974 as one of the at-large members of the Council of the District of Columbia at its creation, and he served in that position until his death in 1977.

In a 1972 interview, Hobson said one contemporary he admired was Sterling Tucker, not because he agreed with him on everything, but because he was smart and cunning, worked with everyone, and had many political accomplishments.

Hobson was the People's Party nominee for vice president in 1972, being nominated at the party's convention on a ticket with Benjamin Spock. Himself being terminally ill with cancer, Hobson did not actively campaign on behalf of the ticket. Spock and Hobson polled 0.1014% of the National popular vote, receiving no electoral votes.

== FBI Informant ==
In 1981, The Washington Post revealed that documents in the Federal Bureau of Investigation file on Hobson revealed that he had once provided information to the FBI about the black freedom movement. It reported that "there are 29 specific reports over a five-year period of Hobson giving information to agents contained in the massive 1,575-page file obtained by The Post through the Freedom assembled the file on Hobson over a nearly 20-year period from the 1950s to the early 1970s. The file indicates, among other things, that Hobson gave the FBI information on advanced planning for the historic March on Washington led by Martin Luther King Jr. in 1963 and was paid $100 to $300 in expenses to monitor and report on civil rights demonstration plans at the 1964 Democratic National Convention in Atlantic City. On another occasion, he reported on a 1965 meeting in Detroit involving a revolutionary black group and, on still another, he warned agents of possible violence at a Philadelphia demonstration that same year, according to the file."

The article also reported that FBI Agent Elmer Lee Todd "said he met regularly with Hobson — sometimes as often as twice a month — from about 1961 to late 1964, mostly to discuss and assess potentially violent or disruptive demonstrations, organizations and individuals in the civil rights movement." The article does not indicate that Hobson, who the FBI also monitored for his activism, provided information to the FBI after 1965.

In 1995, Cartha DeLoach, the third most senior official in the FBI, described Hobson as "a paid FBI informant" in his book, Hoover's FBI: The Inside Story by Hoover's Trusted Lieutenant.

== Personal life ==
While attending Howard University, Hobson met Carol Smith. They married in 1947, and they had a son Julius Hobson Jr. and a daughter Jean Hobson. Carol filed for divorce in 1966, citing religious differences and that Hobson occasionally prioritized activism over the needs of his family.

Three months later, he was on his second date with Tina Lower when he asked her to marry him. Tina was originally from Anaheim, California, a graduate of Stanford University, and an employee at the National Institute for Public Affairs. He admired her sense of peace and justice. She was divorced with two teenage sons. Some local activists criticized Hobson for having a relationship with Tina, saying he "talked black but dated white."

Hobson advocated that blacks should build socialism as per Karl Marx.

== Death ==
After experiencing persistent back pain, Hobson was diagnosed with a form of cancer of the spine called multiple myeloma In 1971. He later learned he also had acute leukemia.

Hobson died of leukemia at George Washington University Hospital on March 23, 1977.

At the time of his death, his son, Julius Hobson Jr., was a member of the District of Columbia Board of Education.

== Memorials ==
In 1980, a group of co-operative apartment buildings at First and M streets and New York Avenue NW built in the 1930s were rehabilitated, renamed the Julius Hobson Plaza Condominiums, and sold as condos.

In 1979, the Edmonds School on Capitol Hill was closed, and the students and staff moved to Watkins Elementary School as the Region 4 Middle School. In 1981, the school was renamed the Julius W. Hobson Middle School. In 1986, schools in the Capitol Hill neighborhood of Washington were reorganized, and Stuart Middle School was combined with Hobson to create Stuart-Hobson Middle School.

== Quotes ==
On democracy: "In this country, you don't have any democracy really. You have the right to elect but not to select. For example, here's two people: you get to vote for one of them. But you didn't choose in the first place either of them. That's not democracy from what I understand."

On being a politician: "I am not a politician. A politician is someone who does things to get elected. He's a guy who says things to please the public, that he thinks the public wants to hear, and his story changes with every passing day. I want to be elected, but I am not going to say a damn thing for your benefit, or that person's benefit out there on the street, or anybody's."

On a local black minister: "I was asked to speak at his church one Sunday. I went over there and when I went there I looked over the congregation. I would say the average person in there had on a pair of Thom McAn shoes, that their suits cost an average $35 a piece, that their shirts were from Hechts basements and that they were very poor and very illiterate - almost illiterate - people who were emotionally shocked just came to the church to let out this scream. [The minister] took up a love offering, he took up a minister's travel offering and then he took up a regular - he took up five or six offerings. So when he got to me to speak, I got up and said, 'God damn it, if this is Christianity, I want no part of it.' And 'this son of a bitch is stealing from you and the thing is, he's not just stealing your money, he's stealing your minds. And I refuse to be a part of this.' And I walked off."

About his interracial marriage: "Tina thinks black is beautiful, and I think white is beautiful, and anybody that's got a psychological problem about that — don't come aboard the Statehood Party."

As long as the courts offer justice, there's no excuse for the bomb throwers.

After being the only candidate elected to the Board of Education before a runoff: "We've got a one-man School Board right now. All in favor of firing [Superintendent William R.] Manning say 'aye.'"
