= Spöck =

Spöck may refer to:

- Spöck (Eider), a river of Schleswig-Holstein, Germany
- Spöck, a village in Baden-Württemberg, Germany, now part of the town of Stutensee
- Spöck, a village in Bavaria, Germany, now part of the town of Kirchheim in Schwaben
- FC Spöck, a German football club in the Verbandsliga Baden

== See also ==
- Spock (disambiguation)
