= Bilt Rewards =

American financial services company

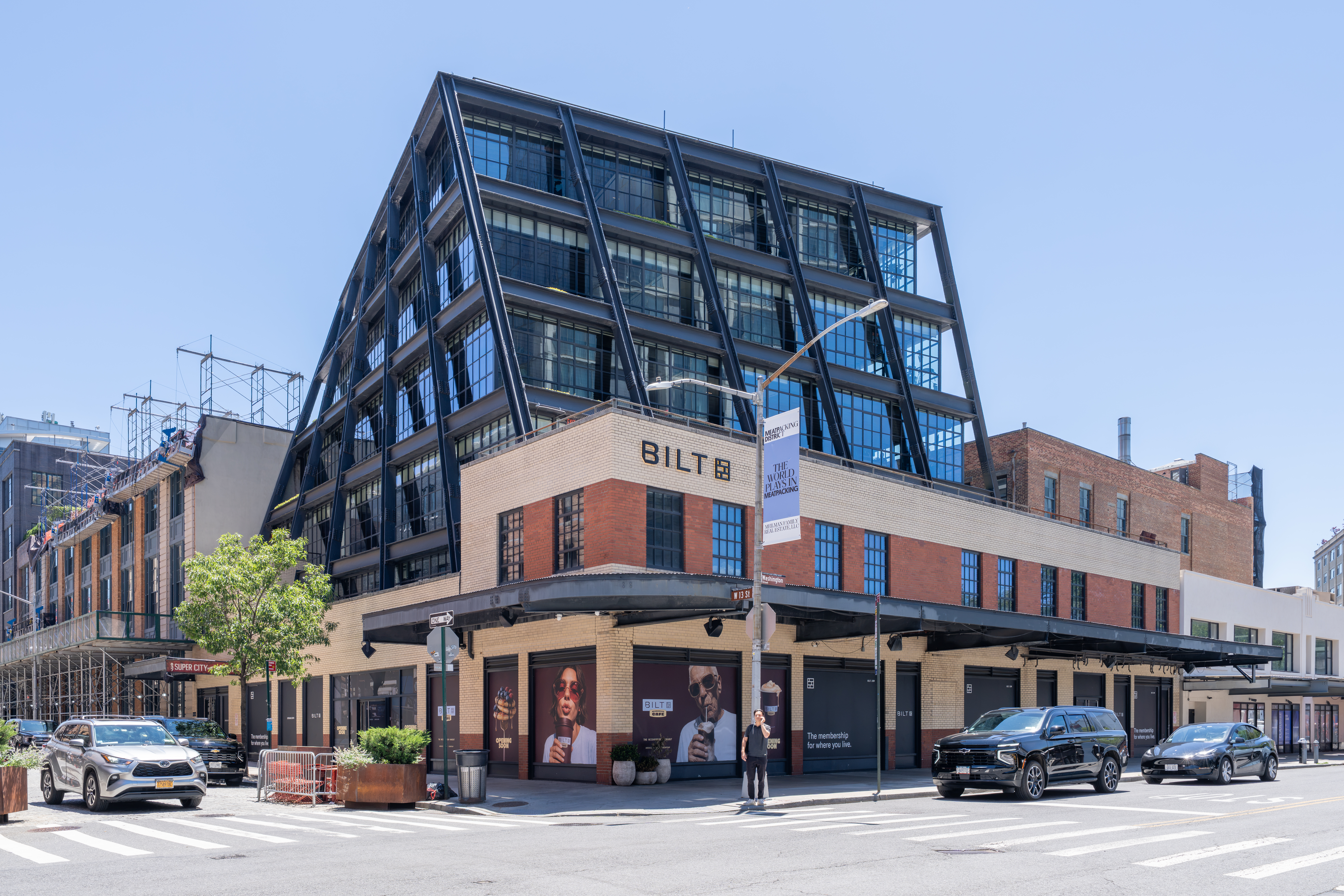
- Headquarters in Meatpacking District, Manhattan
- Type: Private
- Industry: Financial technology
- Founded: 2019
- Founder: Ankur Jain
- Headquarters: New York City, New York, U.S.
- Website: biltrewards.com or bilt.com

Bilt Rewards is an American financial technology company that operates a loyalty and payments platform focused on housing and neighborhood commerce. Founded by Ankur Jain in 2019 and officially launched in June 2021, the company is headquartered in New York City. The company allows users to earn points on rent and mortgage payments, and redeem them for travel, dining, fitness, future housing costs and transfers to airline and hotel loyalty partners. As of 2026, Bilt had about 5.5 million active members.

== History ==
Bilt Rewards was founded in 2019 by Ankur Jain, who serves as its chief executive officer (CEO). The company officially launched in 2021. In October 2022, Bilt introduced its first credit card in partnership with Wells Fargo to allows renters to earn points on rent payments made directly through participating property portals or the Bilt app. At the time of its launch, the company raised $150 million in a growth round led by Left Lane Capital, with participation from Smash Capital, Wells Fargo, Greystar, Camber Creek, Fifth Wall, Prosus Ventures, and Kairos, valuing the company at $1.5 billion.

In January 2024, the company raised $200 million in a round led by General Catalyst, doubling its valuation to $3.1 billion. Ken Chenault joined Bilt’s board as chairman, and NFL Commissioner Roger Goodell joined as an independent director. In August 2024, Teachers’ Venture Growth, the venture investment arm of Ontario Teachers Pension Plan, led a $150 million funding round that valued Bilt at $3.25 billion.

In March 2025, Bilt Rewards acquired Banyan, a fintech company providing item-level receipt data infrastructure. In April 2025, Bilt partnered with American Campus Communities, a student housing provider, to offer rewards on monthly campus housing payments. In July of that same year, Bilt Rewards raised $250 million in a funding round co-led by General Catalyst and GID, with participation from United Wholesale Mortgage (UWM), at a valuation of $10.75 billion (more than triple its valuation a year earlier).

In October 2025, Bilt and UWM partnered to provide rewards on mortgage payments, extending the rent-rewards model to homeowners. The following month, Bilt partnered with Rakuten to let users convert Rakuten cash back into Bilt Points. In January 2026, Bilt relaunched its credit card program as "Bilt 2.0," ending the Wells Fargo partnership and moving to new cards issued by Column N.A. and serviced by Cardless. In April 2026, Bilt announced a strategic partnership with Bed Bath & Beyond, Inc. to integrate its loyalty platform across the retailer's brands.

== Products and services ==
Bilt Rewards operates a loyalty and housing payments platform spanning co-branded credit cards, rent and mortgage payment processing, and a points-based rewards program. Under a 2025 agreement with PayPal, members can also make rent payments through Venmo. In February 2026, Bilt added support for mortgage payments through its partnership with United Wholesale Mortgage, extending the platform to homeowners.
