= Spock (website) =

Spock Networks, Inc.
- Screenshot of spock.com
- Company type: Private
- Website type: Search engine
- Available in: English
- Founded: 2006
- Dissolved: 2009
- Headquarters: Redwood City, California
- Key people: Jaideep Singh, Co-founder/CEO; Jay Bhatti, Co-founder/VP product Hongche Liu, Chief Information Architect
- Website: www.spock.com
- Commercial: Yes
- Registration: optional
- Launched: 2006
- Current status: Defunct

Spock was a U.S. search website specialized in finding people; also known as a vertical search engine or entity search engine. The name "Spock" is a backronym: "single point of contact (by) keyword." Founded in 2006 by Jay Bhatti and Jaideep Singh, it "indexed over 250 million people representing over 1.5 billion data records." These records were from publicly available sources, including Wikipedia, IMDb, ESPN, LinkedIn, Hi5, MySpace, Friendster, Facebook, YouTube, Flickr, Twitter, corporate biographies, university faculty and staff pages, real estate agents sites, school alumni and member directory pages, etc. The company maintained that "30% of all Internet searches are people-related".

As entity resolution was the main algorithmic hurdle of their indexing endeavour, Spock issued and awarded the Spock Challenge Prize. The winning entry combined various machine learning algorithms.

Spock opened its service to public beta on August 8, 2007.

On April 30, 2009, Spock was acquired by Intelius.
