= Jake Medwell =

American venture capitalist

- Born: 1988 (age 37–38); United States
- Education: USC Marshall School of Business
- Occupation: Venture capitalist
- Known for: Co-founded venture capital firm 8VC

Jake Medwell (born 1988) is an American businessperson and venture capitalist. He co-founded and is a partner at 8VC, a Silicon Valley-based venture capital firm.

== Early life and education ==
Jake Medwell was born in 1988. He received his early education from Bellevue High School. Later, he attended Marshall School of Business at the University of Southern California, where he graduated with a bachelor's degree in entrepreneurship.

== Career ==
In 2007, Medwell co-founded The Kairos Society, where he remains on the board. While attending the University of Southern California in 2009, he co-founded Solé Bicycles. In 2013, he co-founded Humin, a contact management company, which was acquired by Tinder. The following year, he established Eight Partners LLC. In 2015, he co-founded 8VC, a venture capital firm, where he specializes in logistics and supply chain.

In 2018, Medwell was involved in founding Baton, a logistics company that catered to Fortune 500 companies and was later acquired by Ryder. During the COVID-19 pandemic in 2020, he co-founded Operation Masks to help alleviate the shortage of personal protective equipment (PPE). In 2020, he was named as one of the leading investor in supply chain tech by PitchBook.

Medwell serves as a board member for several companies within the 8VC portfolio. He also serves as a technology advisor to Lineage Logistics. He was recognized in the Forbes 30 Under 30 list in 2017.
