= Post-transaction marketing =

Post-transaction marketing are Marketing practices after a purchase is completed, with the goal of continuing and developing the customer relationship into long-term value. This includes display advertising of subsidiary products or offers, encouraging repeat purchases, or advertising loyalty or subscription programmes connected to the retailer.

This is a tactic used to generate additional revenue from customers after they’ve completed a purchase, rather than focusing only on new sales.

Post-transactional marketing is typically positioned within customer lifecycle management, emphasizing the period after payment or commitment, when customers form post-purchase evaluations and decide whether to repurchase, recommend, complain, return items, or disengage. Research on the post-purchase phase highlights that experiences after purchase meaningfully shape attitudes and future behavior, including loyalty and repurchase intentions.

== Common practices ==
Common post-transactional marketing practices (when conducted transparently and with appropriate consent) include:

- Onboarding and product education (e.g., setup guidance, usage tips, customer success check-ins)
- Customer support and service recovery following service failure or dissatisfaction
- Feedback collection (post-purchase surveys, reviews)
- Loyalty and retention programs (points, perks, member communications)
- Post-sale services such as returns, exchanges, maintenance, and warranties, which some studies link to stronger relationships and repurchase intentions in online retail contexts
- Cross-selling and upselling that is clearly presented as an additional, optional purchase
- Service recovery and complaint handling are frequently discussed in the literature as influential in satisfaction and subsequent behavioral intentions, including repurchase.
- Online “post-transaction” third-party offers and consumer concerns

== Benefits and criticisms ==
Supporters of post-transactional marketing practices argue they can: improve customer outcomes through education and support, reduce churn and increase satisfaction through service recovery, provide relevant offers that match customer needs, create long-term value through relationship-building and post-sale service enhancements.

Critics argue that some implementations, particularly those that rely on confusing interfaces or unclear consent can undermine informed consent during checkout, increase unwanted subscriptions and billing disputes, erode trust in merchants and online commerce, or impose friction on cancellation and refunds.
