= Northeast Maglev =

Proposed high-speed rail-line in the United States

Overview
- Status: Proposed
- Owner: Northeast Maglev, LLC
- Locale: Northeastern United States
- Termini: Washington, D.C.; New York City
- Stations: 8
- Website: www.northeastmaglev.com

Service
- Type: High-speed rail
- Rolling stock: L0 Series

History
- Planned opening: 2030

Technical
- Operating speed: 314 mph (505 km/h)

Northeast Maglev is a proposed maglev train system in the Northeastern United States. A private U.S. company, The Northeast Maglev, LLC, was established to promote the idea, and ultimately build the line, using the SCMaglev superconducting maglev system developed by the Central Japan Railway Company (JR Central) to provide 70-minute service between New York City and Washington, D.C., with intermediate stops at Baltimore-Washington International (BWI) Airport and Baltimore, and ultimately connecting major metropolitan hubs and airports across the Northeast.

On August 1, 2025, the Trump administration halted its review of the project, placing it on indefinite hold and possibly killing it.

== History ==
In 2003, the Federal Railroad Administration (FRA) and the Maryland Transit Administration (MTA) prepared a Draft Environmental Impact Study (DEIS) on a proposal to build a maglev project linking downtown Baltimore to BWI Marshall Airport and Union Station in Washington, D.C. The project would have used Transrapid, a German maglev technology. An Environmental Impact Statement was prepared, but Maryland suspended the project and a final EIS was never issued.

The Northeast Maglev, LLC, was founded on March 25, 2010, to promote a revived effort to bring a maglev train to the Northeast Corridor. Baltimore-Washington Rapid Rail, LLC, was founded in October 2011 and is the developer of the Northeast Maglev's first leg from Washington, D.C., to Baltimore.

In March 2015, the FRA issued notice of available funding under the Maglev Deployment Program (MDP). In April 2015, acting on behalf of Baltimore–Washington Rapid Rail (BWRR), the Maryland Department of Transportation (MDOT) submitted an application to FRA for the funds to perform preliminary engineering (PE) and National Environmental Policy Act (NEPA) work related to BWRR's SCMAGLEV proposal.

In 2015, the Maryland Public Service Commission (PSC) approved BWRR's application to acquire a passenger railroad franchise abandoned in 1935 by the Washington, Baltimore and Annapolis Electric Railroad Company. The Maryland PSC found that "the construction and operation of the SCMAGLEV between Washington, DC and Baltimore will result in substantial economic and social benefits to the State (of Maryland) and Baltimore and be consistent with the State's environmental laws and policies enacted or adopted to reduce harmful emissions for cleaner air and address the causes of climate change," and that awarding a franchise to facilitate in development of the SCMAGLEV was "in the public convenience and necessity."

In 2016, the FRA awarded $27.8 million to MDOT to prepare preliminary engineering and NEPA analysis for an SCMAGLEV train between Baltimore, MD, and Washington, DC, with an intermediate stop at BWI Airport.

The FRA and the MDOT were preparing an Environmental Impact Statement (EIS) to evaluate the potential impacts of constructing and operating a high-speed superconducting magnetic levitation, utilizing JR Central's SCMaglev system, between Washington, DC and Baltimore, Maryland with an intermediate stop at BWI Airport. That EIS was "temporarily" ceased, waiting for an "updated engineering input from Baltimore Washington Rapid Rail, the subsidiary of Baltimore-based Northeast Maglev" and the FRA citing "so that work does not have to be redone once the engineering inputs are finalized", in December 2019. The EIS was being prepared in compliance with NEPA, as amended, and other applicable regulations and procedures. Baltimore-Washington Rapid Rail is providing preliminary engineering and technical assistance as well as additional funding support, in concert with the FRA grant, for the NEPA process.

In a Purpose and Need Statement, the NEPA Team for the SCMaglev Project, led by FRA and coordinated by MDOT, said the project's purpose was to increase capacity, reduce travel time, and improve both reliability and mobility options between Baltimore and Washington. "The population in the Baltimore-Washington area makes up one of the largest and densest population centers in the United States. Over the next 30 years the population in the area is projected to increase by approximately 30 percent. Similarly, the demand on the transportation infrastructure between Baltimore and Washington will continue to increase..."

The project has received endorsements of support from organizations including North America's Building Trades Unions, Greater Baltimore Urban League, Maryland State Conference NAACP and four of its local branches, and four Baltimore–Washington corridor chambers of commerce including Prince George's Chamber of Commerce, Northern Anne Arundel County Chamber of Commerce, Baltimore City Chamber of Commerce, and Baltimore County Chamber of Commerce.

On June 9, 2020, it was released that Northeast Maglev and B&O Railroad Museum created an alliance to bring educational support to the museum.

On August 1, 2025, the Trump administration halted its review of the project. The proposal would cause "significant, unresolvable impacts to federal agencies and federal property," according to a letter the FRA sent Thursday to Maryland Transportation Secretary Paul Wiedefeld and shared with The Baltimore Banner. The letter also cites "substantial delay and cost overruns" associated with the review process. "This project did not have the means to go the distance, and I can't in good conscience keep taxpayers on the hook for it," U.S. Transportation Secretary Sean Duffy said in an emailed news release.

== Route ==
=== Washington, D.C. to Baltimore ===
The first leg of the Northeast Maglev would connect Washington, D.C., and Baltimore, with a stop at BWI Airport.

The first leg would be approximately 75% underground, and require a guideway (track) and three stations, a rolling stock storage depot, maintenance facility, power substations, ventilation plants, and an operations facility.

In December 2018, the Federal Railroad Administration released an Alternatives Report that identified two alignments that run along Baltimore-Washington Parkway to be carried forward as part of the more detailed Draft Environmental Impact Statement (DEIS) assessment process. The DEIS is a detailed analysis of the remaining options as they compare to the baseline, which is a 'no-build' option. The Alternatives Report also identified multiple station locations to be considered as part of the DEIS. In Baltimore, potential station locations include Cherry Hill in south Baltimore and a separate location closer to Baltimore's Inner Harbor at Camden Yards. Proposed stations in Washington, D.C., include locations below New York Avenue, to the west and east of Mt. Vernon Square.

=== Northeast Corridor ===
While two specific routes are under consideration for the line's first leg from Washington, D.C., to Baltimore, routes from Baltimore to New York have yet to be designed. In all, the Northeast Maglev is planned to have eight stops, including:

- Washington, D.C.
- Baltimore-Washington International (BWI) Airport
- Baltimore, Maryland
- Wilmington, Delaware
- Philadelphia International Airport
- Philadelphia, Pennsylvania
- Newark Liberty International Airport
- New York City

== Technology and rolling stock ==
The Northeast Maglev would use the SCMaglev superconducting maglev system developed by Central Japan Railway Company (JR Central), with a variation of the high-speed L0 Series maglev train to be used as the rolling stock.

JR Central has been developing SCMaglev technology since 1962. The Japanese government fully approved the technology for passenger service in 2014, and JR Central began offering public rides on its Yamanashi test track that year. The train holds the world record for fastest maglev train. JR Central is now constructing its first SCMaglev line, called the Chūō Shinkansen, to connect Tokyo and Nagoya, and later Osaka.

== See also ==
- Baltimore–Washington Superconducting Maglev Project
- American Maglev Technology
- North Atlantic Rail
