= L0 Series =

Japanese maglev train type

- L0 series 5-car maglev train undergoing tests, September 2013
- Manufacturers: Mitsubishi Heavy Industries, Nippon Sharyo, Hitachi Rail
- Constructed: 2011–
- Entered service: 2011; 2020 (improved)
- Number built: 14 vehicles
- Number in service: 12 vehicles (1 set)
- Formation: Test: 5–12 cars Operation: 16 cars
- Capacity: End cars: 24; Intermediate cars: 68
- Operator: JR Central
- Line served: Chūō Shinkansen

Specifications
- Train length: 299 m (981 ft 0 in) (12-car formation)
- Car length: 28 m (91 ft 10 in) (end cars); 24.3 m (79 ft 9 in) (intermediate cars)
- Width: 2.9 m (9 ft 6 in)
- Height: 3.1 m (10 ft 2 in)
- Doors: 2 × 1 per car
- Maximum speed: Design: 550 km/h (342 mph); Record: 603 km/h (375 mph); Operational: 500 km/h (311 mph)
- Power supply: L0 series: gas turbine-electric Improved L0 series: unknown
- Electric system: 33 kV AC
- Current collection: L0 series: none Improved L0 series: induction (wireless power transfer)
- Track gauge: SCMaglev guideway

The L0 Series (Japanese: L(エル)0(ゼロ)系(けい), Hepburn: Eru-zero-kei; "L zero series") is a high-speed maglev train which the Central Japan Railway Company (JR Central) has been developing and testing. JR Central plans to use the L0 series on the Chūō Shinkansen railway line between Tokyo and Osaka, which is under construction.

The L0 series uses the Japanese-designed SCMaglev system. Mitsubishi Heavy Industries and Nippon Sharyo, a subsidiary of JR Central, are building fourteen pre-production vehicles.

A seven-car train set a land speed record for rail vehicles of 603 km/h (375 mph) on 21 April 2015. The trains will run at a maximum speed of 500 km/h (311 mph) in commercial service, offering journey times of 40 minutes between Tokyo (Shinagawa Station) and Nagoya, and 1 hour 7 minutes between Tokyo and Osaka.

== Specifications ==
The end cars of L0 series trainsets are 28 meters (92 ft) long and carry 24 passengers. The nose extends 15 meters (49 ft) for better aerodynamics and reduced noise in tunnels. Intermediate cars are 24.3 meters (80 ft) long and carry 68 passengers each; the train is 299 m (981 ft) long and holds as many as 728 passengers. Each row is four seats wide, one fewer per row than on JR Central Shinkansen trains. The cars are more box-shaped than earlier models, creating more interior space. Cars are painted white and blue. During normal operation, the train operates at a maximum speed of 500 km/h (310 mph).

The train does not require a driver, but has a camera at the front of both end cars in order to allow for remote operation, in case the automated systems fail. The camera is more apparent on the revised end cars; it was introduced in 2020. It moved to a higher position on the car and increased in size.

The superconducting magnets in the bogies are built by Toshiba and Mitsubishi Electric. The cars are built by Nippon Sharyo with Mitsubishi Heavy Industries having built some in the past. Mitsubishi Heavy Industries stopped producing cars in 2017 after car manufacturing cost disagreements with JR Central and the Mitsubishi SpaceJet's spiralling development costs. The bogies are arranged in a Jacobs bogie configuration.

== Planned operations ==
=== Chuo Shinkansen ===
Construction on the Chuo Shinkansen line on which the train would run began in December 2014. The first section to Nagoya was originally expected to be completed in 2027. However, in 2024, Central Japan Railway Co President Shunsuke Niwa said that due to construction delays a 2027 opening was now impossible and it is not expected to open until at least 2034. That section will be approximately 85% tunnels with an estimated cost of ¥5.5 trillion (US$46.5 billion). The relatively high cost is in large part due to the many tunnels being constructed.

The complete line to Osaka is estimated to cost ¥9 trillion ($74.7 billion), and was expected to be completed by 2045, after an eight-year pause in construction to recuperate costs. However, after receiving a ¥3 trillion ($28 billion) loan from the Japanese government, JR Central moved the project forward. It now expects to be able to open the full line as early as 2037, with construction beginning immediately after completion of the Tokyo–Nagoya section.

=== United States ===
A route from Washington, D.C. to Baltimore, eventually extending to New York City has received support in the United States. JR Central chairman Yoshiyuki Kasai spoke with U.S. President Barack Obama about the L0 series during Prime Minister Shinzo Abe's 28 April 2015 visit.

In August 2017, development partner Mitsubishi announced that talks had "stalled" because of "a lack of clarity on the Trump administration's stance on high-speed rail". In March 2019, Northeast Maglev project director David Henley said in an interview that they planned to have a Record of Decision for the D.C.–Baltimore section by August 2020. Construction was to begin later that year or in early 2021. According to Henley, operations will begin in 2027–28, allowing for a construction period of 7 years.

In late 2025, the entire project was cancelled by the Federal Railroad Administration.

== History ==
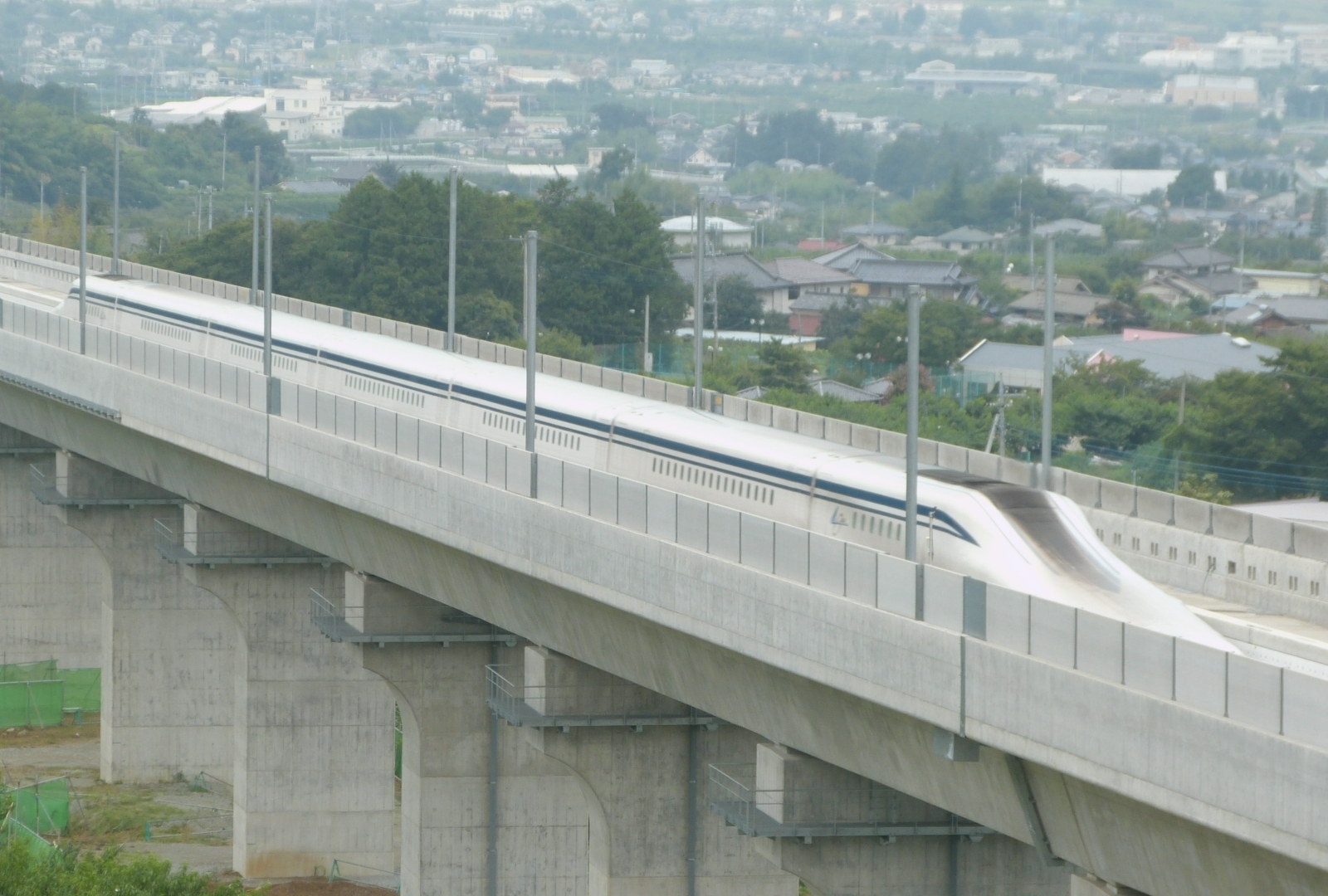
The first L0 series undergoing test-running in August 2014

=== L0 series ===
The first L0 series vehicle was delivered to the Yamanashi Maglev Test Line and unveiled in November 2012. The first five vehicles were linked up and placed on the guideway in June 2013.

The first five-car train began test-running at the 42.8 km (26.6 mi) Yamanashi Maglev Test Line in June 2013, following completion of extension and upgrade work at the facility, earlier than the originally scheduled September date. The maximum speed of test runs was gradually increased, reaching 500 km/h (311 mph) by the end of July 2013. The five-car train was lengthened to seven cars in September 2013, and test-running as a 12-car formation commenced on 25 June 2014. The train was reverted to a 7-car formation later in 2014, and used for public preview rides starting in November.

A series of endurance and speed tests was carried out on the 42.8 km (26.6 mi) test rail in April 2015 to examine the reliability and durability of the L0 after repeated high speed usage. Several speed and distance records were set in the process. After April 2015, the train returned to being used for public preview rides.

=== Improved L0 Series ===
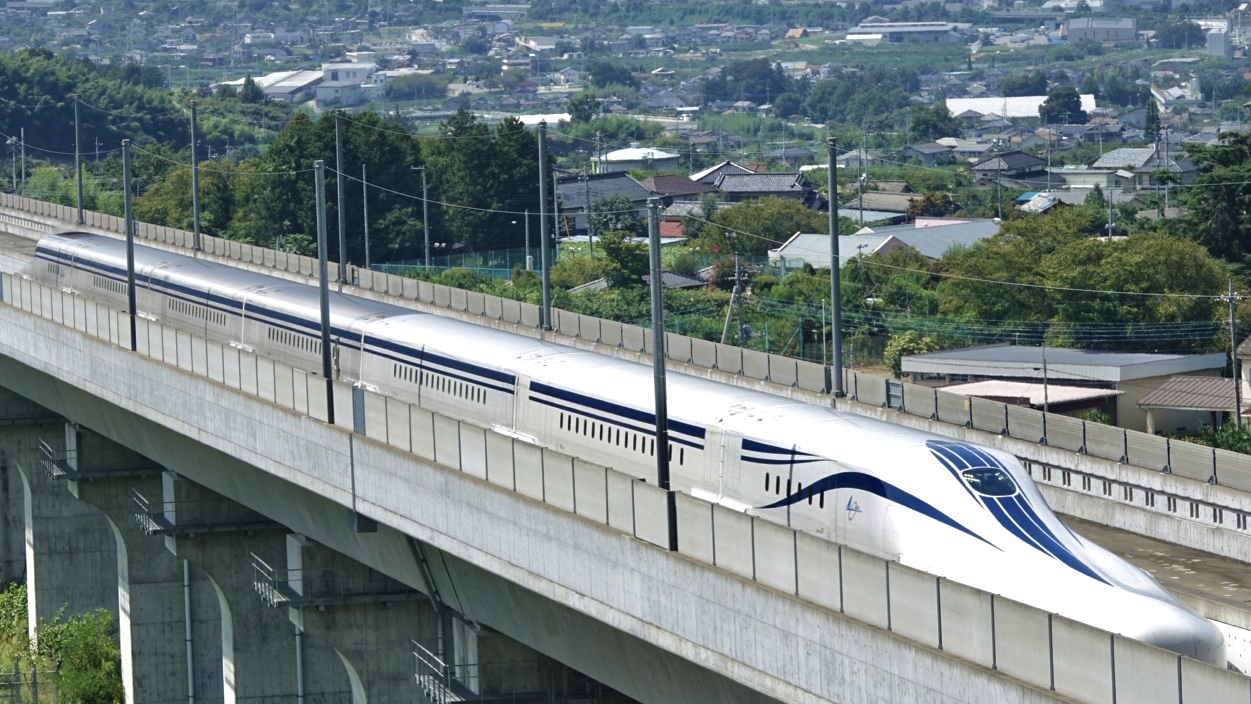
An Improved L0-series train in Fuefuki, Japan, 29 August 2020

Plans were for a revised model (the Improved L0 series) to replace the L0 series starting in May 2020 (named the "Improved L0 series"). It is the first L0 series to receive power from the guideway through induction. Before the new series train was introduced, on-board power was provided by a small gas turbine generator in each end car. The new end cars feature a relocated and enlarged camera; they are more aerodynamic thanks to the removal of the exhaust vent necessary for the generator. Plans were to replace one end car by 2020 and one intermediate car. That means that the train consists of a combination of revised and original cars for a period of time, it will be able to generate electricity with its onboard generator while testing the induction system.

The new cars were completed in March 2020. While presenting the new end car to the press, lead designer Motoaki Terai stated that this model represents the completion of around 80–90% of the design goals for the final train.

=== M10 ===
An updated design, named the M10, was announced in February 2025, featuring technological improvements and a new interior. In July 2025 a single M10 intermediate car began testing.

Compared to previous designs, the M10 features a riblet film and high-temperature superconductors. The riblet film, which is inspired by shark skin, is applied to the outside of the vehicle to reduce drag, while the "high-temperature" superconductors require less cooling which simplifies the refrigeration equipment, reducing weight and energy consumption.

== Records ==
=== Speed records ===
- 16 April 2015: Fastest manned train in the world (590 km/h (370 mph))
- 21 April 2015: Fastest manned train in the world (603 km/h (375 mph))

On 16 April 2015, a manned seven-car L0 series trainset reached 590 km/h (370 mph), breaking the previous world record of 581 km/h (361 mph) set by a Japanese MLX01 maglev train set in December 2003. The speed of 590 km/h was sustained for a period of 19 seconds. That speed record was broken again on 21 April 2015, when a manned seven-car set recorded a top speed of 603 km/h (375 mph) and hit its top speed at 10:48 am, about 4 minutes into the run. With 49 JR Central employees on board, the train sustained the speed for 10.8 seconds, travelling 1.8 kilometers (1.1 mi) during that time.

=== Distance records ===
- 10 April 2015: Longest distance travelled in one day (3,904 km (2,426 mi)), breaking the previous record (2,876 km (1,787 mi)) set in 2003.
- 14 April 2015: Longest distance travelled in one day (4,064 km (2,525 mi)).

== See also ==
- High-speed rail
- Land speed record for rail vehicles
- Shinkansen
- Transrapid
- CRRC Maglev
- Super Bullet Maglev
