= Ground effect =

Ground effect may refer to:

- Ground effect (aerodynamics), the increased lift and decreased aerodynamic drag of a wing close to a fixed surface
- Ground effect (cars), an effect that creates downforce, primarily in racing cars
- Ground-effect vehicle, a vehicle which attains level flight near the surface of the Earth due to ground effect
- Ground-effect train, an alternative to a magnetic levitation train, using ground effect in aircraft to prevent the vehicle from making contact with the ground
