= Baltimore–Washington Superconducting Maglev Project =

Proposed high-speed railway

Baltimore–Washington Superconducting Maglev

Overview
- Status: Not feasible
- Locale: Baltimore, Anne Arundel Co. and Prince George's Co, MD; and Washington, D.C.
- Termini: Camden Station or Cherry Hill (North); Mount Vernon Square (Washington, D.C.) (South)
- Stations: 3
- Website: https://www.bwmaglev.info/

Service
- Type: Inter-city, Maglev
- System: Maryland Transit Administration
- Rolling stock: SCMaglev

Technical
- Line length: 40 mi (64 km)
- Character: At-grade, elevated, and underground
- Operating speed: 314 mph (505 km/h)

The Baltimore–Washington Superconducting Maglev Project (SCMAGLEV) was a proposal to connect the United States cities of Baltimore, Maryland, and Washington, D.C., with a 40 miles (64 km) maglev train system between their respective central business districts. It was the first segment of the planned Washington-New York Northeast Maglev project. The maglev proposal is not related to the Baltimore–Washington hyperloop proposed by the Boring Company.

== Background ==
The idea of using a high-speed maglev transportation system to link Washington DC and Baltimore dates back to the 1990s. Section 1218 of the "Transportation Equity Act for the 21st Century" created a National Magnetic Levitation Transportation Technology Deployment Program. The program is administered by the Federal Railroad Administration (FRA), a unit of the U.S. Department of Transportation. The objective of the program is to demonstrate high-speed maglev technology in commercial service through a project of about 40 miles (64 km) in length, so that it can be considered later in the century for implementation in a longer distance intercity corridor application. Section 1218 envisioned $1 billion in federal funding for a single demonstration system which must be matched by other sources 2 to 1. FRA selected seven projects for further study in May 1999, and they received $55 million in further funding to develop their proposals. Of these seven, Baltimore–Washington and Pittsburgh advanced to next stage as semi-finalists in April 2001.

In 2001, the Federal Railroad Administration (FRA) published a Record of Decision (ROD) following completion of a Programmatic Environmental Impact Statement (PEIS) for the Maglev Deployment Program. The purpose of this action was to demonstrate Maglev technology by identifying a viable maglev project in the US, and assisting a public/private partnership with the planning, financing, construction, and operation of a project. As published in the ROD, FRA concluded that Maglev was an appropriate technology for use in new transportation options in Maryland and Pennsylvania and should be further studied at the project level.

In coordination with MDOT's Maryland Transit Administration (MTA), FRA then prepared and circulated a Draft Environmental Impact Statement (DEIS) in 2003, for a maglev project linking downtown Baltimore, BWI Marshall Airport, and Union Station in Washington, DC. The DEIS documented project needs, including transportation demand, regional economic growth, and reducing corridor congestion. The DEIS also documented feasible mitigation measures for the environmental impacts as well as the benefits of the project alternatives.

In 2007, FRA prepared a Final Environmental Impact Statement (FEIS); however, the FEIS was not finalized.

Federal funding of the project development continued through fiscal year 2004. However, due to legislation passed by the state of Maryland in 2004, the Baltimore–Washington project dropped out and did not receive federal funding for fiscal year 2005. Instead, the program funded Pittsburgh and a line between Las Vegas and Anaheim in fiscal year 2005, with all federal funding removed from the program after that year.

In 2009, the Maryland Department of Transportation released "Maryland's FY 2009-2014 Consolidated Transportation Program (CTP)" document which is divided into different PDF documents. In the "Maryland Transportation Administration" document on page 42, marked "Page MTA-38" in the lower-right hand corner is a listing for the Maglev System Study which lists under description: "Feasibility study and preparation of environmental documentation involved with operating magnetic levitation trains between Baltimore and Washington, with a stop at BWI Thurgood Marshall Airport." the justification section is very interesting in that the Maryland Transit Administration has received "special federal funding as part of a national demonstration of Maglev technology" it continued that "if feasibility is demonstrated, Maglev could provide rapid and efficient transportation between Baltimore, Washington, and BWI Thurgood Marshall Airport."

The American Recovery and Reinvestment Act of 2009 revived federal funding of intercity high-speed rail, particularly in the context of the Las Vegas to Anaheim route.

Northeast Maglev, a private U.S. company, revived the project in 2010.

In November 2013, the prime minister of Japan, Shinzo Abe, proposed fully financing a high-speed maglev link between Baltimore and Washington, D.C., to president Obama.

Interest increased for the Baltimore to Washington, D.C., project in 2015 when Maryland Governor Larry Hogan visited Japan to ride an advanced prototype maglev train which traveled at 311 miles per hour (500 km/h) and some $28 million of U.S. funding was tapped to study the project.

== History ==
In 2016, the cost of the D.C.-Baltimore connection with three stops, one in each city and at Baltimore-Washington International Marshall Airport, was estimated between $10 billion and $12 billion, of which Northeast Maglev said it had secured $5 billion from Japan. The route had not been decided. In September 2016, the Maryland Transit Administration started conducting an environmental impact study. The review process was expected to be finalized in mid-2019 but instead was paused at that time for a lack of details about the design and engineering.

In May 2020 the Environmental Impact Study (EIS) review process restarted. The draft EIS was published in January 2021, and the period for public comments was extended to May 24, 2021. The target completion date for a combined final EIS and Record of Decision was January 28, 2022.

The two preferred routes in the 2021 draft EIS do not coincide with Amtrak's Northeast Corridor, except for a short segment by the rail yards in Washington. The route in Baltimore is east of and more direct than the Northeast Corridor, terminating at Camden Yards Station rather than Pennsylvania Station. At BWI Marshall, the only stop on the route, the station is inside the airport rather than at a shuttle bus stop. South of the airport, the alignment through suburban and rural Maryland follows the Baltimore–Washington Parkway, a few miles west of the Northeast Corridor. Inside the Washington Capital Beltway, the route stays west of the Northeast Corridor, until the Amtrak rail yards, and then terminates at Mount Vernon Square rather than Union Station. Both city terminals are closer to their downtowns than the current Amtrak stations, especially in Baltimore.

The 2021 project was led by Baltimore Washington Rapid Rail (BWRR), "sister company" to Northeast Maglev, headquartered together in Baltimore. The project, dubbed SCMAGLEV, eas supported by JR Central, in Nagoya, Japan. The public side is described in BWRR's January 2021, press release, as led by the Maryland Department of Transportation (MDOT) and the Federal Railroad Administration (FRA).

Some neighborhood opposition arose, as well as support in the Baltimore–Washington metropolitan area. Other concerns included the private aspect of the public-private partnership, the use of federal lands, and competition for funds and ridership with Amtrak.

On August 25, 2021, the Federal Railroad Administration "paused the project to review project elements and to determine the next steps". In August 2025, the federal government through the Federal Railroad Administration determined the project "was no longer feasible". In response, the Maryland Department of Transportation said they will submit final reports to terminate and close out the cooperative agreement.
