= CRRC Maglev =

Maglev train

CRRC 600 时速600公里高速磁浮交通系统
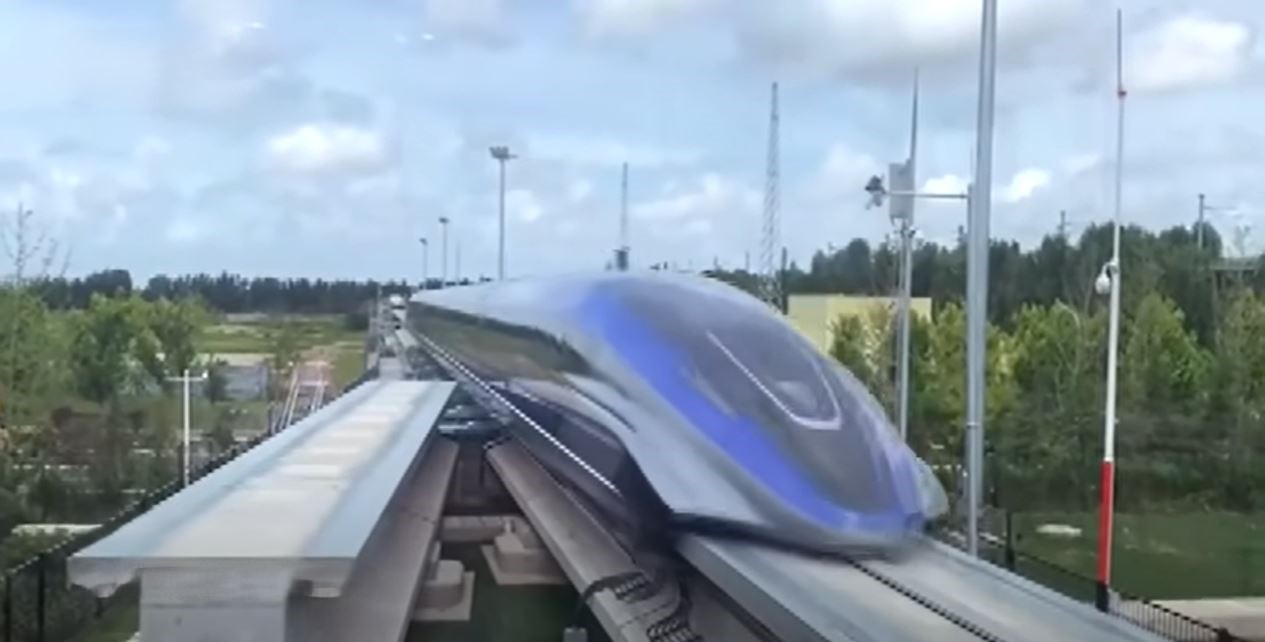
- Manufacturer: CRRC
- Built at: CRRC Qingdao Sifang
- Constructed: 2021–present

The CRRC 600 (Chinese: 时速600公里高速磁浮交通系统; lit. '600 km/h high-speed maglev transportation system') is a high-speed magnetic levitation (maglev) train under development in China, using German Transrapid technology under license from ThyssenKrupp. The first trainset was unveiled in July 2021 at the CRRC Qingdao Sifang factory in Qingdao. The train is planned to reach 600km/h, which would make it one of the fastest trains in the world.

Testing of a 2019 prototype maglev EMU began in 2020 on a 1.5km test track at Tongji University in Shanghai, with testing continuing in 2021. Testing the train to its maximum speed would require extension of the test track, as maglev trains are unable to use regular high speed railway tracks.

The trainsets can carry 2 to 10 carriages, with each holding over 100 passengers.

== See also ==
- Super Bullet Maglev
- List of high-speed trains
