= SCMaglev =

Japanese maglev system

Coordinates: 35°35′N 138°56′E

L0 Series maglev train at Yamanashi test track

The SCMaglev (superconducting maglev, formerly called the MLU) is a magnetic levitation (maglev) railway system developed by Central Japan Railway Company (JR Central) and the Railway Technical Research Institute.

The SCMaglev uses an electrodynamic suspension (EDS) system for levitation, guidance, and propulsion.

In development since the 1960s, the SCMaglev system will be used in the Chūō Shinkansen rail line between Tokyo and Nagoya, Japan. The line, currently under construction, is scheduled to open in 2034 (after delays pushing back its original opening date of 2027.) JR Central is also seeking to sell or license the technology to foreign rail companies. The L0 Series, a prototype vehicle based on SCMaglev technology, holds the record for fastest crewed rail vehicle with a record speed of 603 km/h (375 mph).

== Technology ==
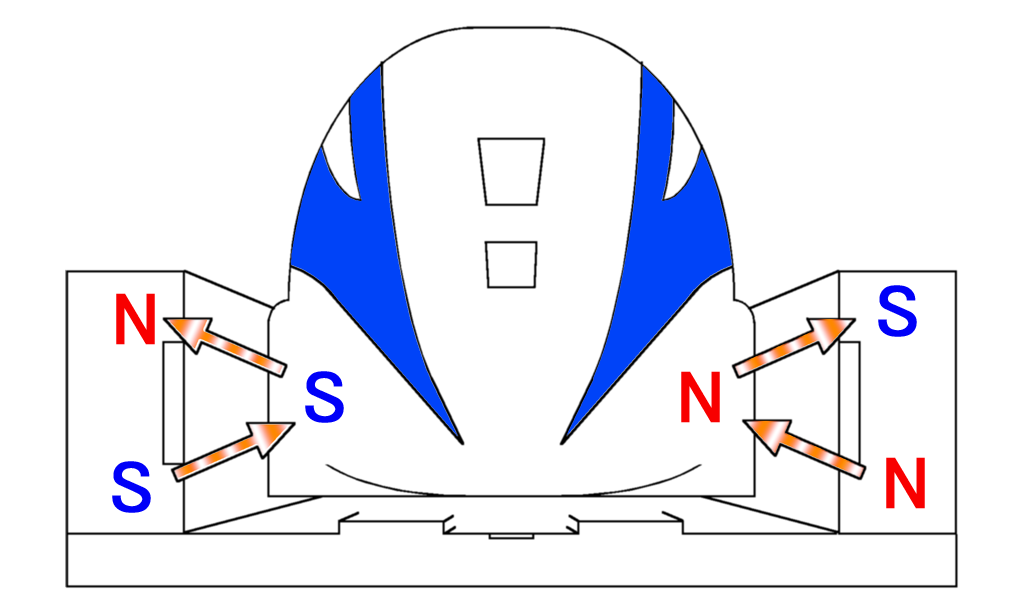
Levitation system

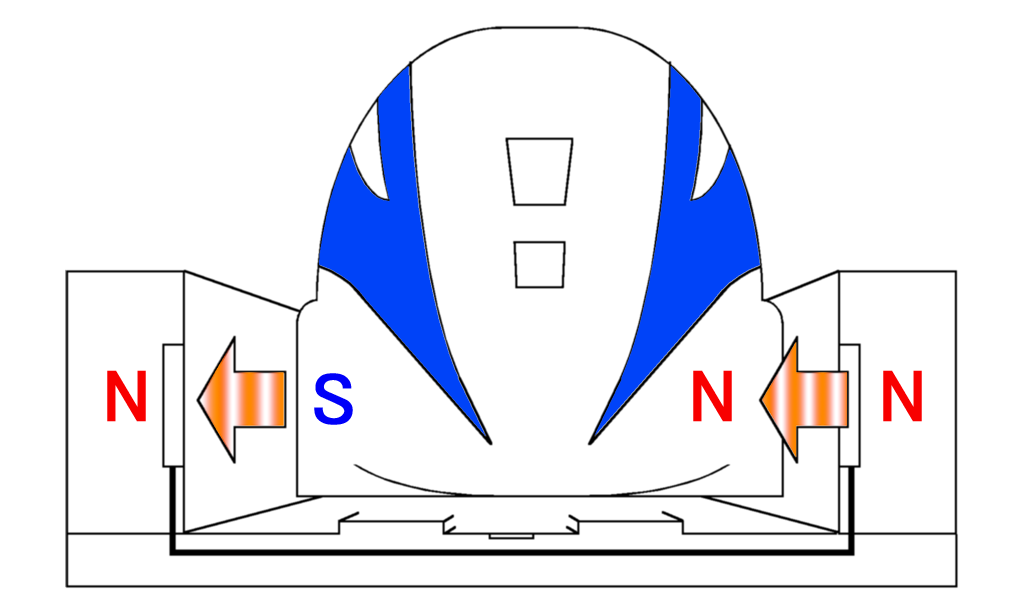
Guidance system

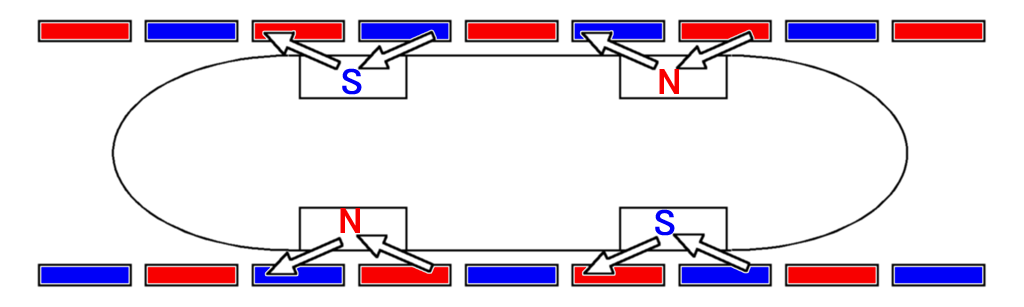
Propulsion system

An illustration of the SCMaglev levitation and propulsion system

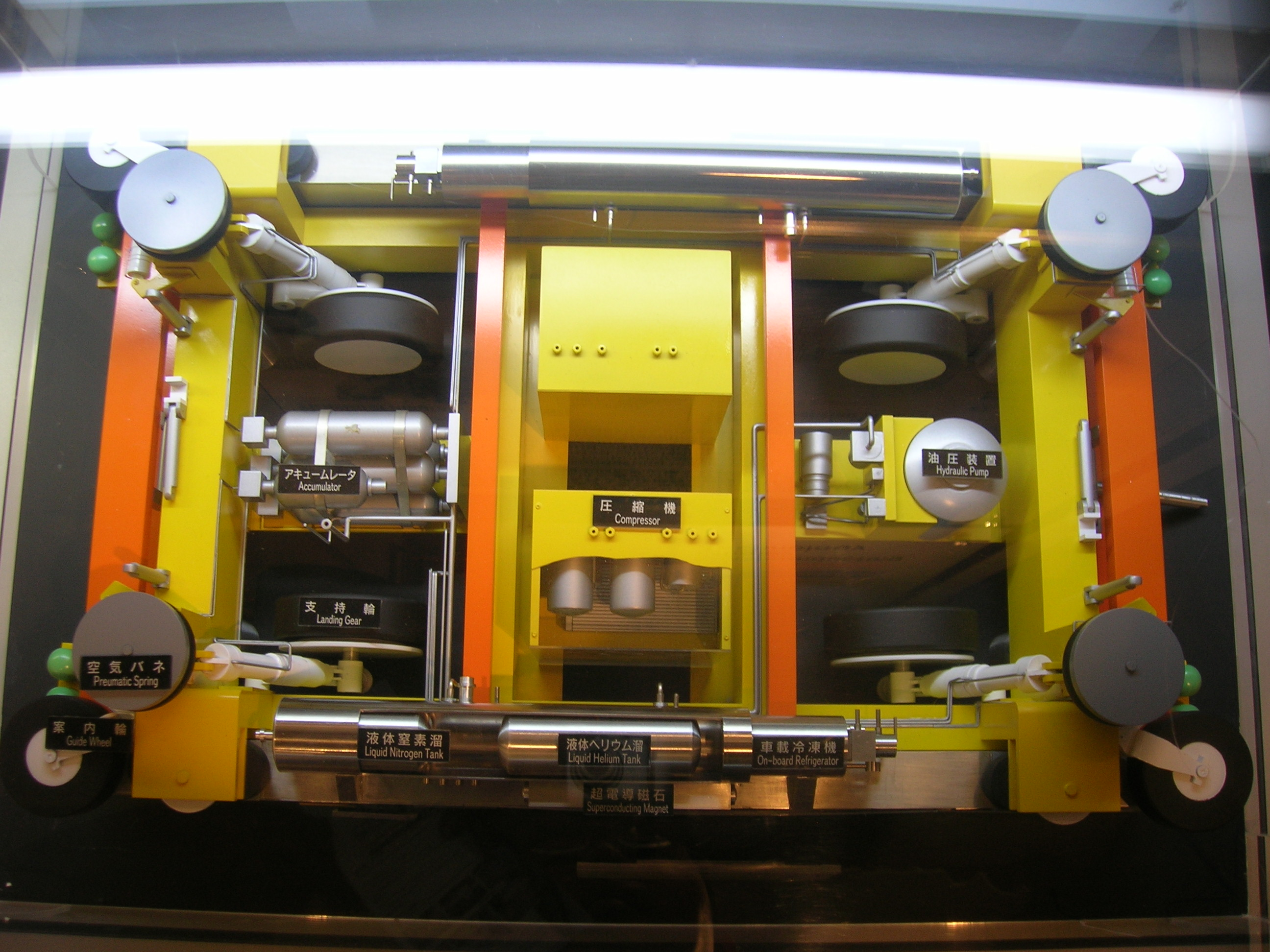
MLX01 maglev train superconducting magnet bogie

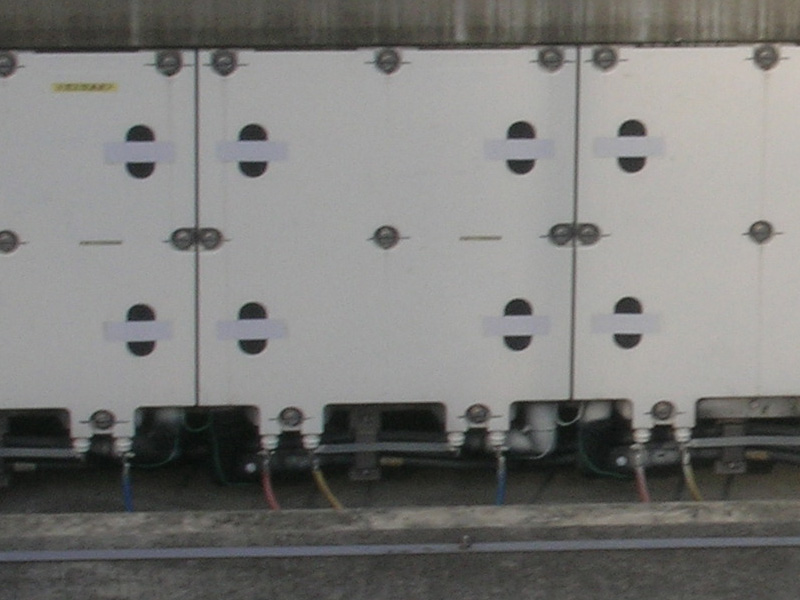
Levitation and guidance coils

The SCMaglev system uses an electrodynamic suspension (EDS) system. The train's bogies have superconducting magnets installed, and the guideways contain two sets of metal coils. The current levitation system uses a series of coils wound into a "figure 8" along both walls of the guideway. These coils are cross-connected underneath the track.

As the train accelerates, the magnetic fields of its superconducting magnets induce a current into these coils due to the magnetic field induction effect. If the train were centered with the coils, the electrical potential would be balanced and no currents would be induced. However, as the train runs on rubber wheels at relatively low speeds, the magnetic fields are positioned below the center of the coils, causing the electrical potential to no longer be balanced. This creates a reactive magnetic field opposing the superconducting magnet's pole (in accordance with Lenz's law), and a pole above that attracts it. Once the train reaches 150 km/h (93 mph), there is sufficient current flowing to lift the train 100 mm (4 in) above the guideway.

These coils also generate guiding and stabilizing forces. Because they are cross-connected underneath the guideway, if the train moves off-center, currents are induced into the connections that correct its positioning. SCMaglev also uses a linear synchronous motor (LSM) propulsion system, which powers a second set of coils in the guideway.

== History ==
Japanese National Railways (JNR) began research on a linear propulsion railway system in 1962 with the goal of developing a train that could travel between Tokyo and Osaka in one hour. Shortly after Brookhaven National Laboratory patented superconducting magnetic levitation technology in the United States in 1969, JNR announced development of its own superconducting maglev (SCMaglev) system. The railway made its first successful SCMaglev run on a short track at its Railway Technical Research Institute in 1972. JR Central plans on exporting the technology, pitching it to potential buyers.

=== Miyazaki test track ===
In 1977, SCMaglev testing moved to a new 7 km test track in Hyūga, Miyazaki. By 1980, the track was modified from a "┴" shape to the "U" shape used today. In April 1987, JNR was privatized, and Central Japan Railway Company (JR Central) took over SCMaglev development.

In 1989, JR Central decided to build a better testing facility with tunnels, steeper gradients, and curves. After the company moved maglev tests to the new facility, the company's Railway Technical Research Institute began to allow testing of ground effect trains, an alternate technology based on aerodynamic interaction between the train and the ground, at the Miyazaki Test Track in 1999.

=== Yamanashi maglev test line ===
Construction of the Yamanashi Maglev Test Line began in 1990. The initial 18.4 km (11.4 mi) “priority section” in Tsuru, Yamanashi, opened in 1997, with MLX01 trains undergoing testing until the fall of 2011. At that point, the facility was closed to extend the line to 42.8 km (26.6 mi) and upgrade it to commercial specifications.

Since 1997, the Chuo Shinkansen has amassed over 2,044,000 miles of test runs, averaging roughly 2,000 kilometers per day. In one record-setting day, the SCMaglev traveled approximately 2,525 miles (4,062 km)—far exceeding the expected daily mileage during routine operation.

== Commercial use ==
=== Japan ===
In 2009, Japan's Ministry of Land, Infrastructure, Transport and Tourism decided that the SCMaglev system was ready for commercial operation. In 2011, the ministry gave JR Central permission to operate the SCMaglev system on their planned Chūō Shinkansen linking Tokyo and Nagoya by 2034, and to Osaka by 2037. Construction is currently underway.

=== United States ===
Since 2010, JR Central has promoted the SCMaglev system in international markets, particularly the Northeast Corridor of the United States, as the Northeast Maglev. In 2013, Prime Minister Shinzō Abe met with U.S. President Barack Obama and offered to provide the first portion of the SC Maglev track free, a distance of about 40 miles (64 km). In 2016, the Federal Railroad Administration awarded $27.8 million to the Maryland Department of Transportation to prepare preliminary engineering and NEPA analysis for an SCMaglev train between Baltimore, Maryland, and Washington, D.C.

=== Australia ===
In late 2015, JR Central, Mitsui, and General Electric in Australia formed a joint venture named Consolidated Land and Rail Australia to provide a commercial funding model using private investors that could build the SC Maglev (linking Sydney, Canberra, and Melbourne), create eight new self-sustaining inland cities linked to the high-speed connection, and contribute to the community.

== Vehicles ==
The following table is based on data published by the Railway Technical Research Institute.

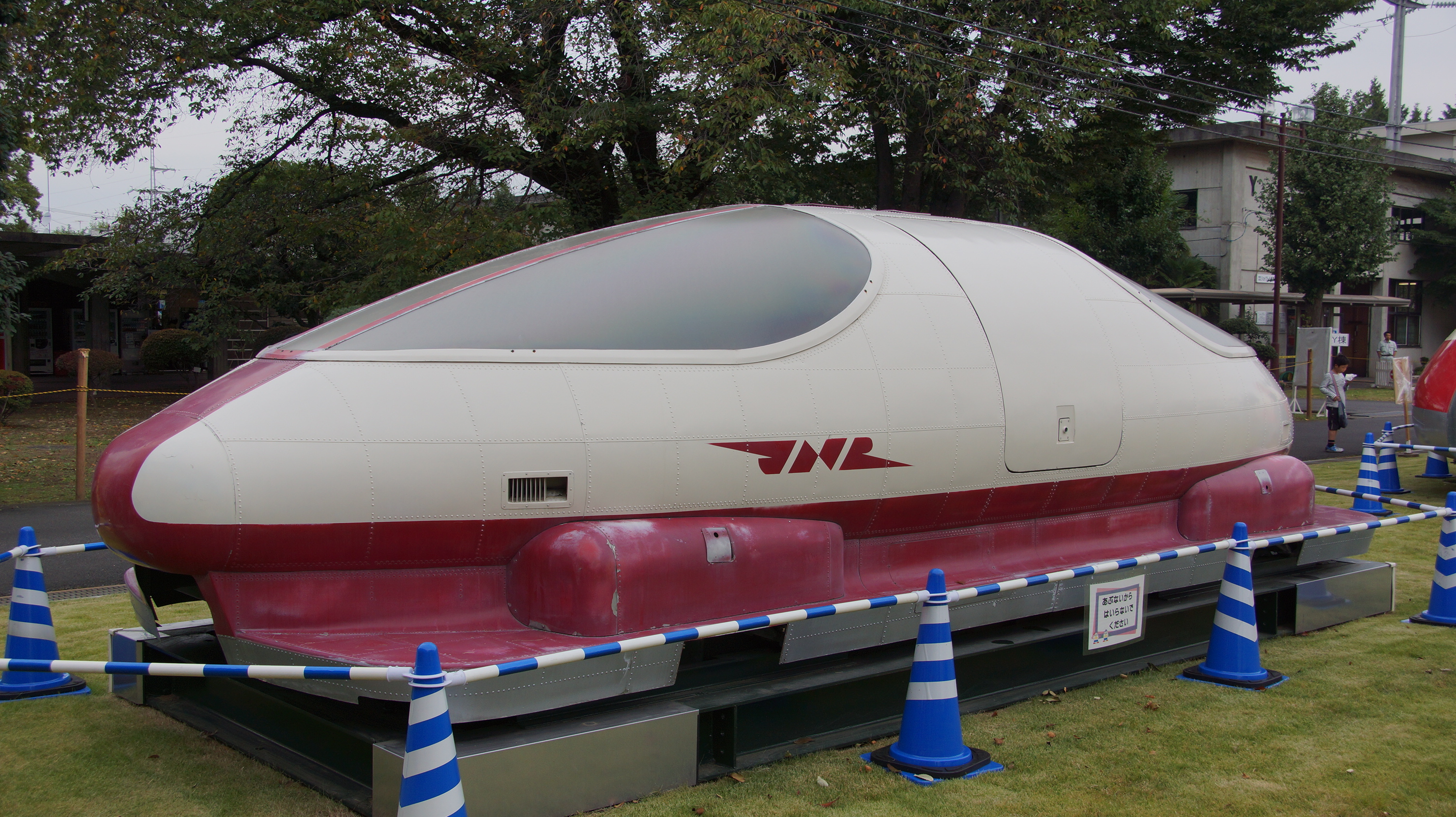
ML100 at RTRI, October 2015

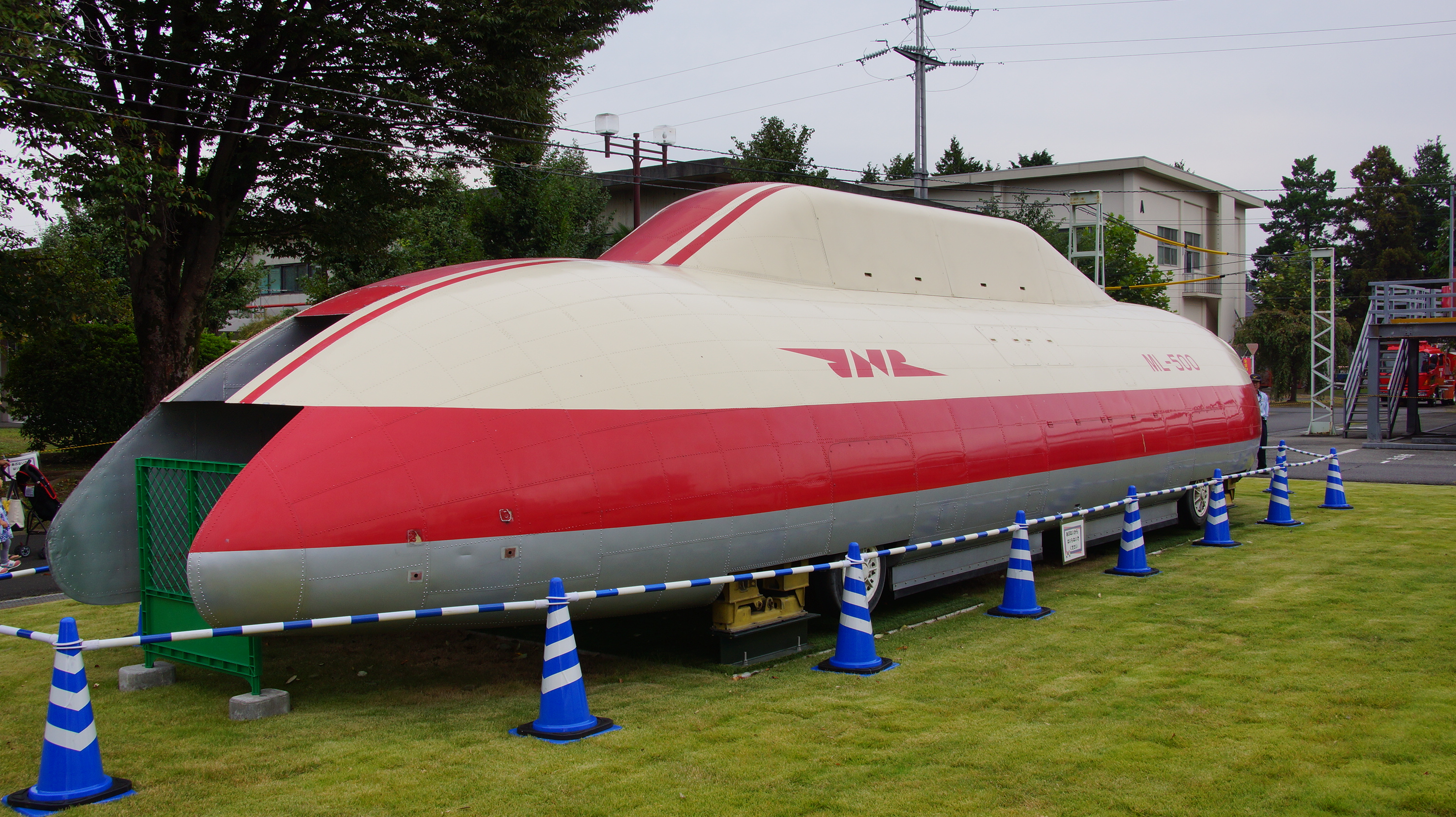
ML500 at RTRI, October 2015. This train type held the 1979 world speed record holder of 517 km/h (321 mph).

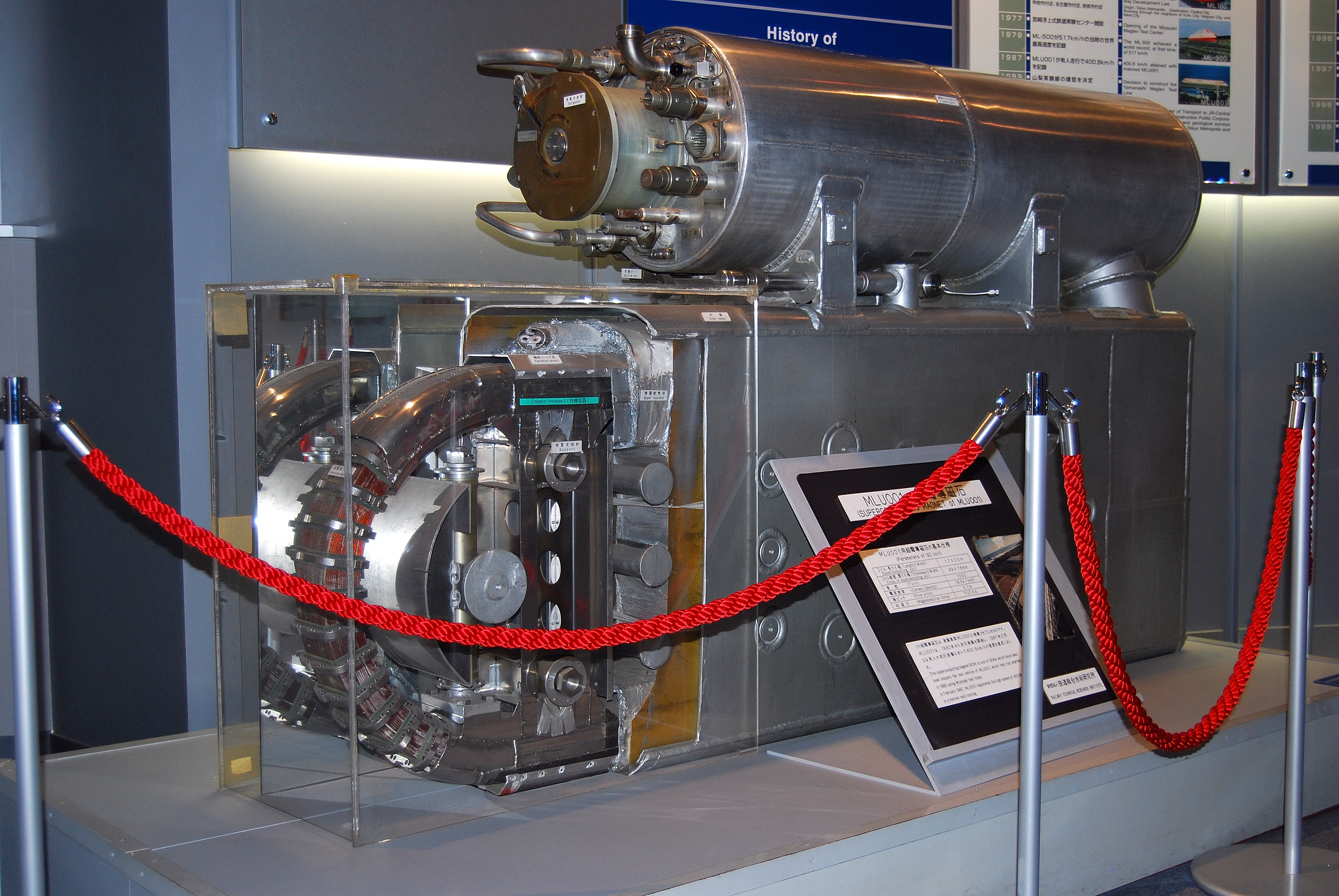
MLU001's superconducting magnet and a liquid helium tank on top of it

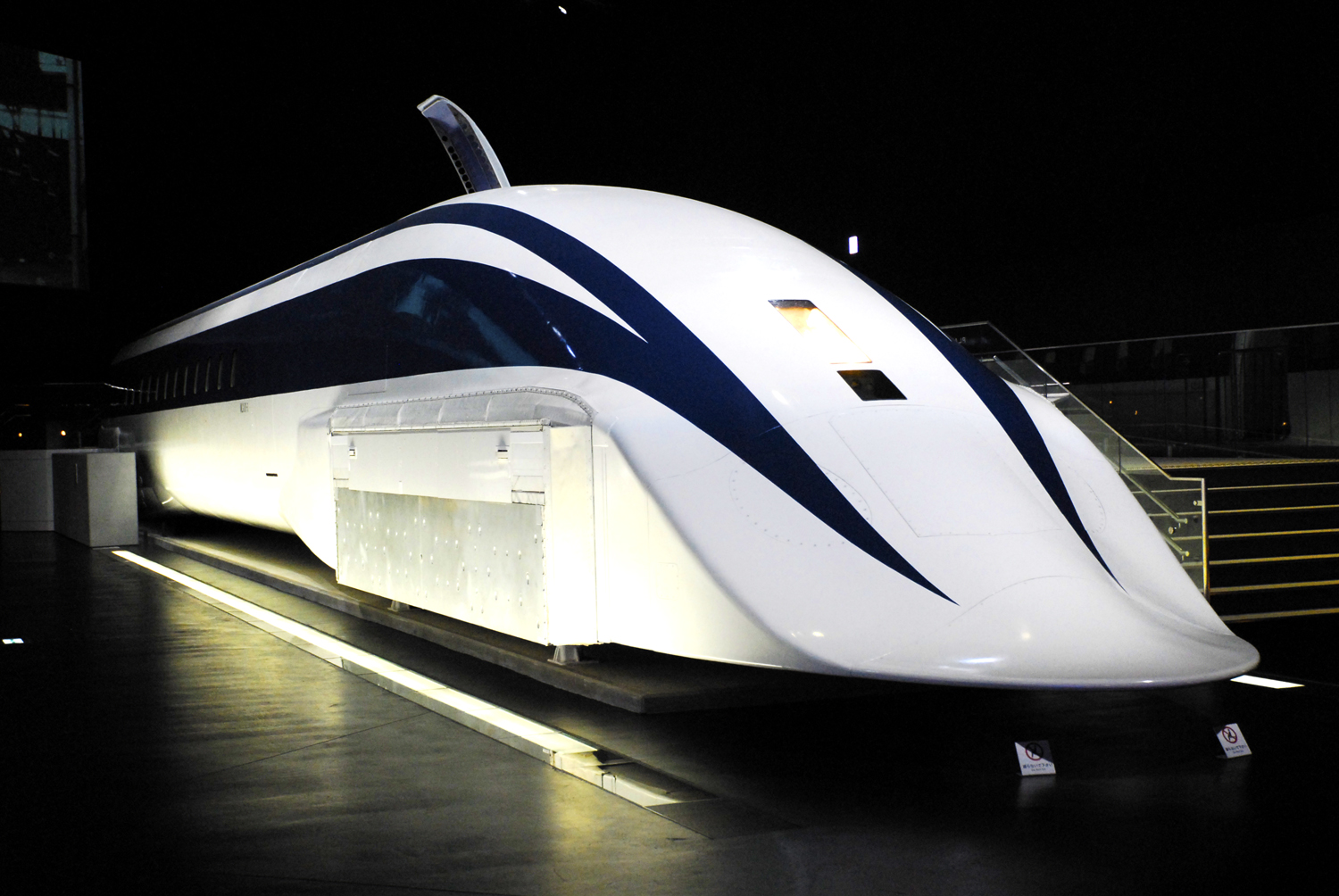
MLX01-1 at SCMaglev and Railway Park, April 2013

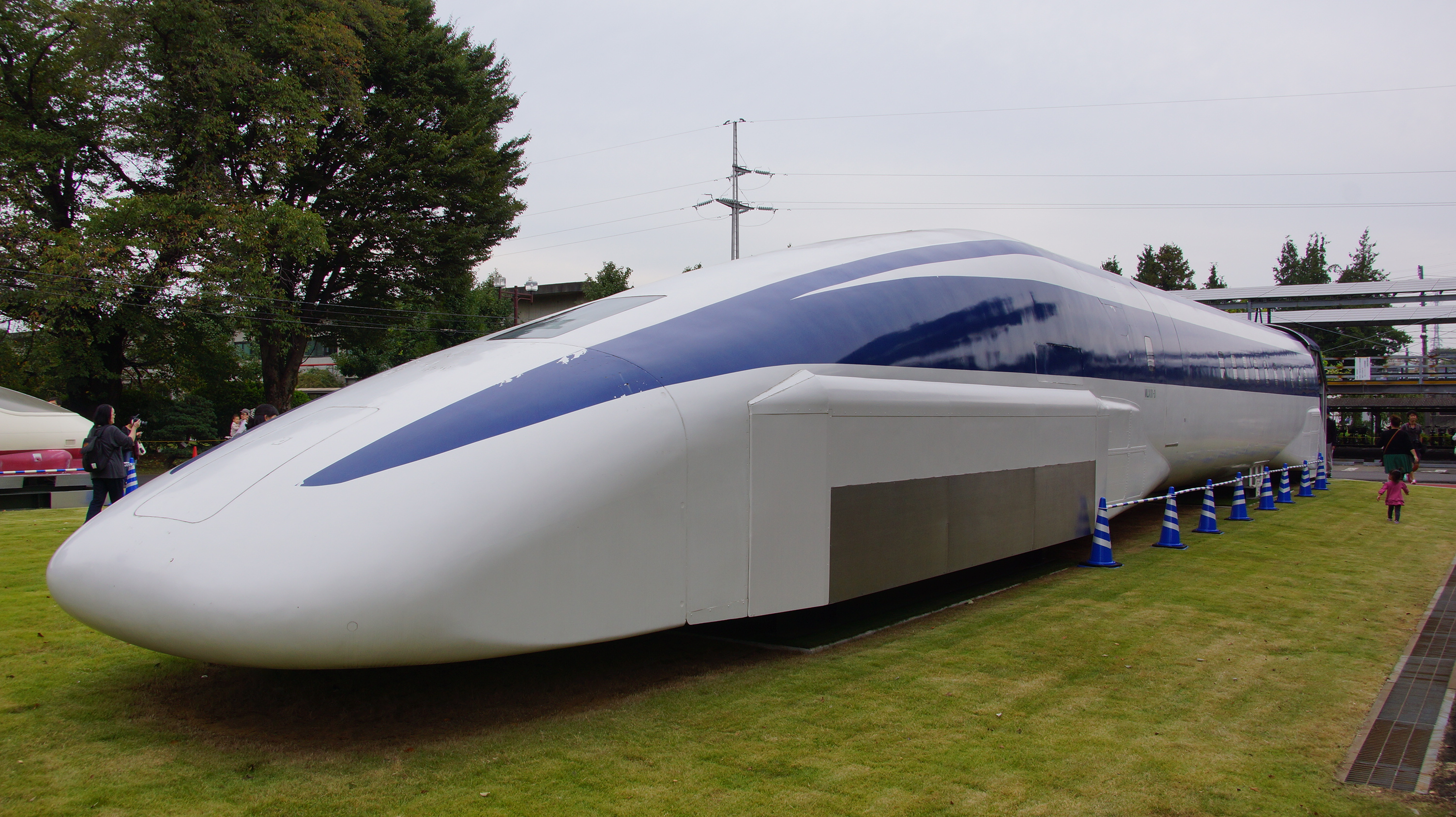
MLX01-3 at RTRI, October 2015

No.	Type	Note	Built
LSM200			1972
ML100	Single-car	Displayed at the Railway Technical Research Institute	1972
ML100A	Single-car		1975
ML500	Single-car	Displayed at the Railway Technical Research Institute	1977
ML500R	Single-car	Redesign after a ML500 caught fire at the Kyushu Test Track	1979
MLU001			1980
MLU002			1987
MLU002N			1993
MLX01-1	Kōfu-end car with double-cusp head	Displayed at the SCMaglev and Railway Park	1995
MLX01-11	Standard intermediate car		1995
MLX01-2	Tokyo-end car with aero-wedge head	Displayed at the Yamanashi Prefectural Maglev Exhibition Center	1995
MLX01-3	Kōfu-end car with aero-wedge head	Displayed at the Railway Technical Research Institute	1997
MLX01-21	Long intermediate car		1997
MLX01-12	Standard intermediate car		1997
MLX01-4	Tokyo-end car with double-cusp head		1997
MLX01-901A	Kōfu-end car with long head	Remodeled and renamed from MLX01-901 in 2009	2002
MLX01-22A	Long intermediate car	Remodeled and renamed from MLX01-22 in 2009	2002
L0	5 to 12-car configurations	Current world speed record holder for all trains.	2013
Revised L0	7-car configuration	Currently operating in Yamanashi	2020
M10		Single-car testing began 2025.	2025

== Records ==
The following tables are based on data published by the Railway Technical Research Institute.

=== Manned records ===
Speed km/h (mph)	Train	Location	Date	Comments
60 (37)	ML100	RTRI	1972	
400.8 (249)	MLU001	Miyazaki	February 1987	Two-car train set. Former world speed record for maglev trains.
394.3 (245)	MLU002	Miyazaki	November 1989	Single-car
411 (255)	MLU002N	Miyazaki	February 1995	Single-car
531 (330)	MLX01	Yamanashi	12 December 1997	Three-car train set. Former world speed record for all trains.
552 (343)	MLX01	Yamanashi	14 April 1999	Five-car train set. Former world speed record for all trains.
581 (361)	MLX01	Yamanashi	2 December 2003	Three-car train set. Former world speed record for all trains.
590 (367)	L0 series	Yamanashi	16 April 2015	Seven-car train set. Former world speed record for all trains.
603 (375)	L0 series	Yamanashi	21 April 2015	Seven-car train set. Current world speed record for all trains.

=== Unmanned records ===
Speed km/h (mph)	Train	Location	Date	Comments
504 (313.2)	ML-500	Miyazaki	12 December 1979	
517 (321.2)	ML-500	Miyazaki	21 December 1979	
352.4 (219.0)	MLU001	Miyazaki	January 1986	Three-car train set
405.3 (251.8)	MLU001	Miyazaki	January 1987	Two-car train set
431 (267.8)	MLU002N	Miyazaki	February 1994	Single-car
550 (341.8)	MLX01	Yamanashi	24 December 1997	Three-car train set
548 (340.5)	MLX01	Yamanashi	18 March 1999	Five-car train set

=== Relative passing speed records ===
Speed km/h (mph)	Train	Location	Date	Comments
966 (600)	MLX01	Yamanashi	December 1998	Former world relative passing speed record
1,003 (623)	MLX01	Yamanashi	November 1999	Former world relative passing speed record
1,026 (638)	MLX01	Yamanashi	16 November 2004	Current world relative passing speed record

== See also ==
- MAGLEV 2000
- Transrapid
- Krauss-Maffei Transurban - Electromagnetic suspension technology had been transferred from Krauss-Maffei.
- ROMAG
- Inductrack
