= American Maglev Technology =

American transportation company

- Company type: Private
- Industry: Transportation; Technology
- Founded: 1994; 32 years ago
- Founder: Tony Morris and Kent R. Davey, Ph.D
- Headquarters: Florida
- Key people: Tony Morris, Jordan Morris
- Website: american-maglev.com

American Maglev Technology (AMT), sometimes referred to as just American Maglev, is an American company founded in 1994 focused on creating maglev systems for public transit based in Amelia Island, Florida with former locations in Marietta, Georgia, and in Volusia County, Florida. It is led by CEO, Tony Morris and vice president Jordan Morris. The company had a working maglev test track located in Powder Springs, Georgia and formerly had one in Volusia County, Florida before moving locations. The company has invested more than $50 million into its research and development projects.

== History ==
American Maglev Technology was founded in 1994. In the mid 1990s, they had a location and test track in Volusia County, Florida that they later abandoned around 2002. Before building the Old Dominion University maglev in 2001, they previously pitched the idea of a maglev system to Virginia Tech and Virginia Beach but later settled on Old Dominion University (ODU) due to the short length of the track required. After failing to get the ODU maglev operational, they departed the project sometime around 2003. The company built their test track at Powder Springs, Georgia in 2006. AMT was reportedly trying to land contracts in Pakistan around 2007. In 2012, AMT pitched a maglev route to connect key destinations in Orlando, Florida. They also pitched a similar route connecting destinations to Port Canaveral, Florida in 2015. The company's business license was revoked by Georgia in 2019. In 2021, it was announced that they had moved to Florida and were working on developing novel cooling solutions for United States military aircraft together with another company named CFoam.

== Proposed Maglev Systems ==
This is a list of all the maglev lines that were proposed by the company but ended up not being built.

- Orlando International Airport to Orange County Convention Center in Florida
- Port Canaveral to Port Cove Retail Area in Florida
- Georgia State Station to Turner Field in Georgia
- Cobb County to Perimeter Mall in Georgia
- Virginia Beach, Virginia
- Virginia Tech

== Criticism ==
American Maglev Technology has faced criticism for its failure to get the maglev system at ODU operational. Concerns were raised towards using up a budget of $16 million, $7 million of that being a loan from the state of Virginia that went unpaid. AMT also faced criticism for closing its test track in Florida, resulting in the loss of jobs there, and for failing to pay contractors for work on the ODU maglev in 2002, resulting in lawsuits that were eventually settled.

== See also ==
- Northeast Maglev
