= Old Dominion University maglev =

Defunct transport system

Old Dominion University Maglev
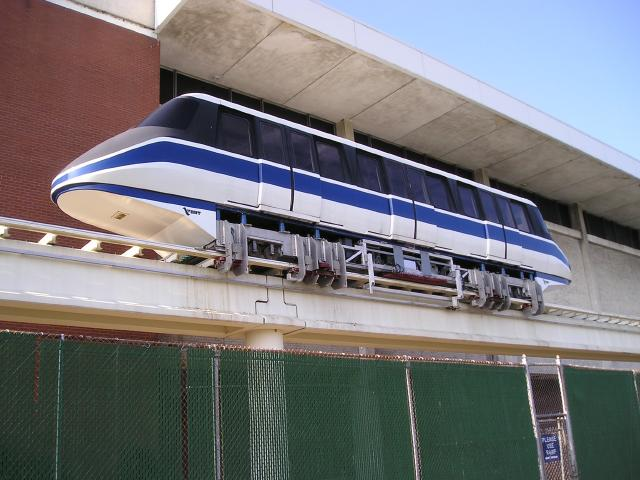
- The maglev at one of the stations

Overview
- Other name: ODU Maglev
- Status: Demolished
- Owner: Old Dominion University
- Locale: Norfolk, Virginia
- Termini: Powhatan Avenue Residence Halls; Ted Constant Convocation Center Parking Garage
- Stations: 3 (planned)

Service
- Type: Maglev
- Rolling stock: 1 custom-built train

History
- Commenced: 2001
- Planned opening: Around 2002 (not met)
- Closed: 2003

Technical
- Line length: 1 km (0.62 mi)
- Number of tracks: 1
- Character: Fully elevated
- Operating speed: 40 mph (64 km/h)

The Old Dominion University (ODU) maglev was a failed public transit maglev system for the campus, developed in 2001. It was developed in partnership with the company American Maglev Technology (AMT) from Georgia and with funding coming from Dominion Virginia Power, Lockheed Martin, and the state. The track spanned 1 kilometer (0.6 miles) from Powhatan Avenue to 46th Street in Norfolk, Virginia. ODU claimed it would have been the first of its kind in America. The guideway served as an important landmark for students. The system has been completely torn down, with the only part remaining being a section of the concrete guideway that spans overtop Hampton Boulevard.

== History ==
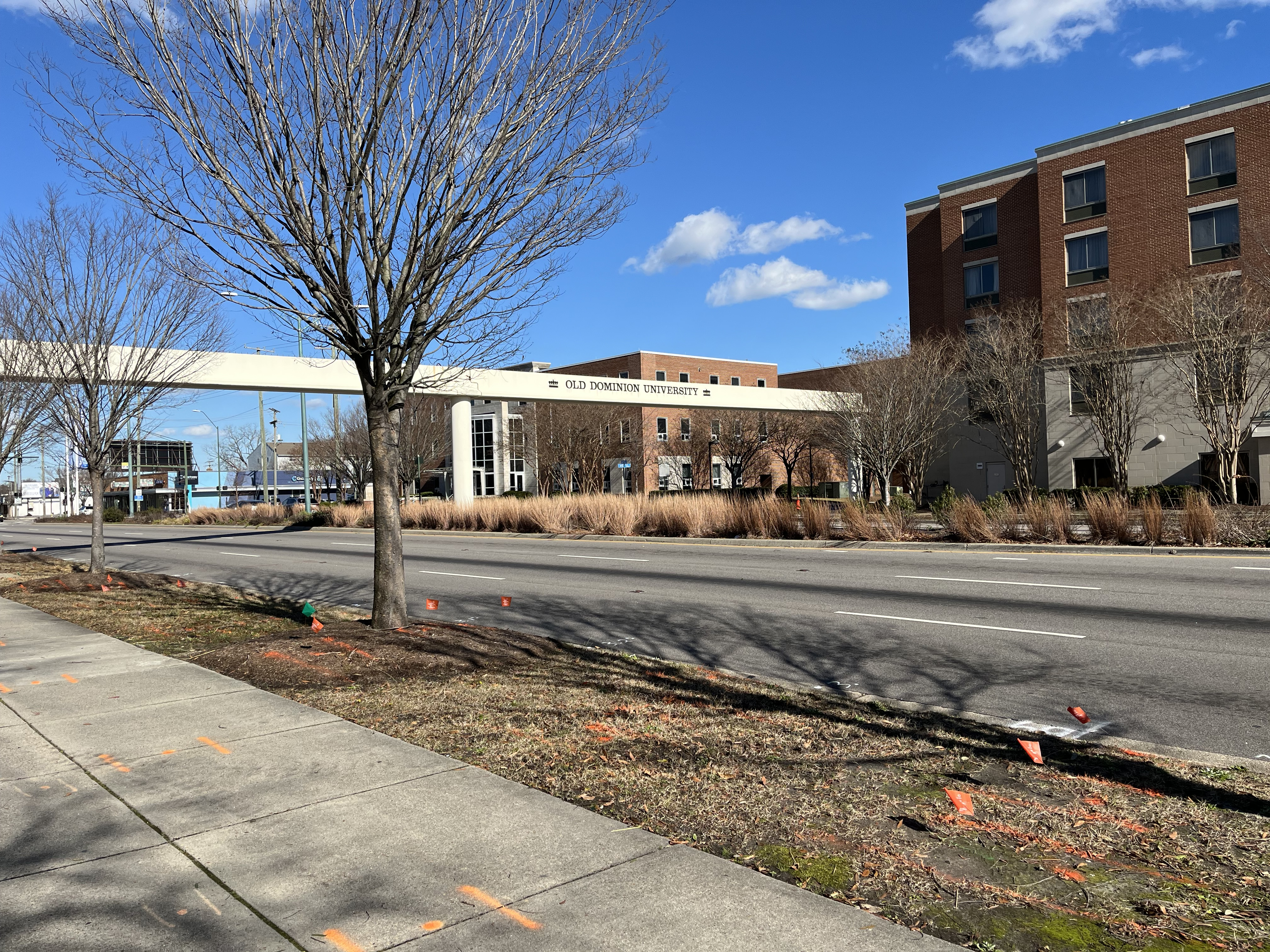
The remaining section of the guideway over Hampton Boulevard.

Plans for the maglev were first announced in 1999, with it slated to begin groundbreaking in the spring of 2001. The maglev was given an initial budget of $14 million. A groundbreaking ceremony was held in August 2001 and by 2002, the concrete guideway and steel track had been completed. The train was put on the track the same year. The vehicle was made from a modified railcar from a different system that had been decommissioned in Florida.

Due to multiple technical issues that consumed the budget, the system was not open yet by 2003. AMT was also faced with lawsuits for not paying contractors working on the system, resulting in additional delays. The vehicle failed to reach its proposed speed of 40 miles per hour, instead only roughly moving around 45 feet before coming to a stop and it made bumping and rattling noises, in addition to vibrating. ODU was granted another $2 million loan to continue development by the Federal Railroad Administration in 2003 due to these issues, although they estimated another $5 million would be needed to finish the stations. AMT departed from the contract around the same time. Due to these issues, it would be announced they would focus on researching maglev technology instead of aiming to get the system operational for public transport.

In 2006, ODU reported that they had made improvements on the train and had successfully moved it from one end of the campus to another without major issues.

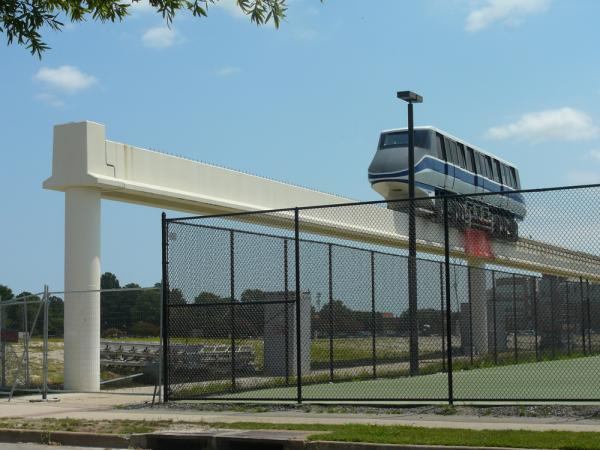
The ODU maglev sitting at the Powhatan Avenue end, circa 2009

In 2008, ODU announced a partnership with another company, MagneMotion Inc. from Massachusetts, to continue research and development of maglev technology using money from a federal Urban Maglev Program grant. The project would create a new vehicle but reuse the currently existing guideway. A 12-foot-long bogie was successfully tested in 2009, which led to plans to continue further development with MagneMotion using a new prototype vehicle built by the company. Later on in 2010, a majority of the existing metal track except for a section near Powhatan Avenue was sold off for scrap money to continue research, along with the demolition of what was built of one of the stations. It is unclear what happened to the original vehicle. A new 80 foot section of track was built on top of the concrete guideway to better interact with the prototype vehicle. A 2013 report on the MagneMotion vehicle published by the Federal Railroad Administration states that the prototype vehicle was successful but additional testing was needed to ensure its reliability for commercial usage. This report also stated that MagneMotion was considering either using the rest of the track at ODU to finish testing or building a test facility in Devens, Massachusetts to complete the design.

After this phase, the guideway sat idle for many years with no further tests being seemingly being conducted. Students at Old Dominion University used it as a rain shelter and as a landmark in the meantime. It was eventually demolished in the summer of 2023, except for one segment that was kept over Hampton Boulevard.

== Planned infrastructure ==
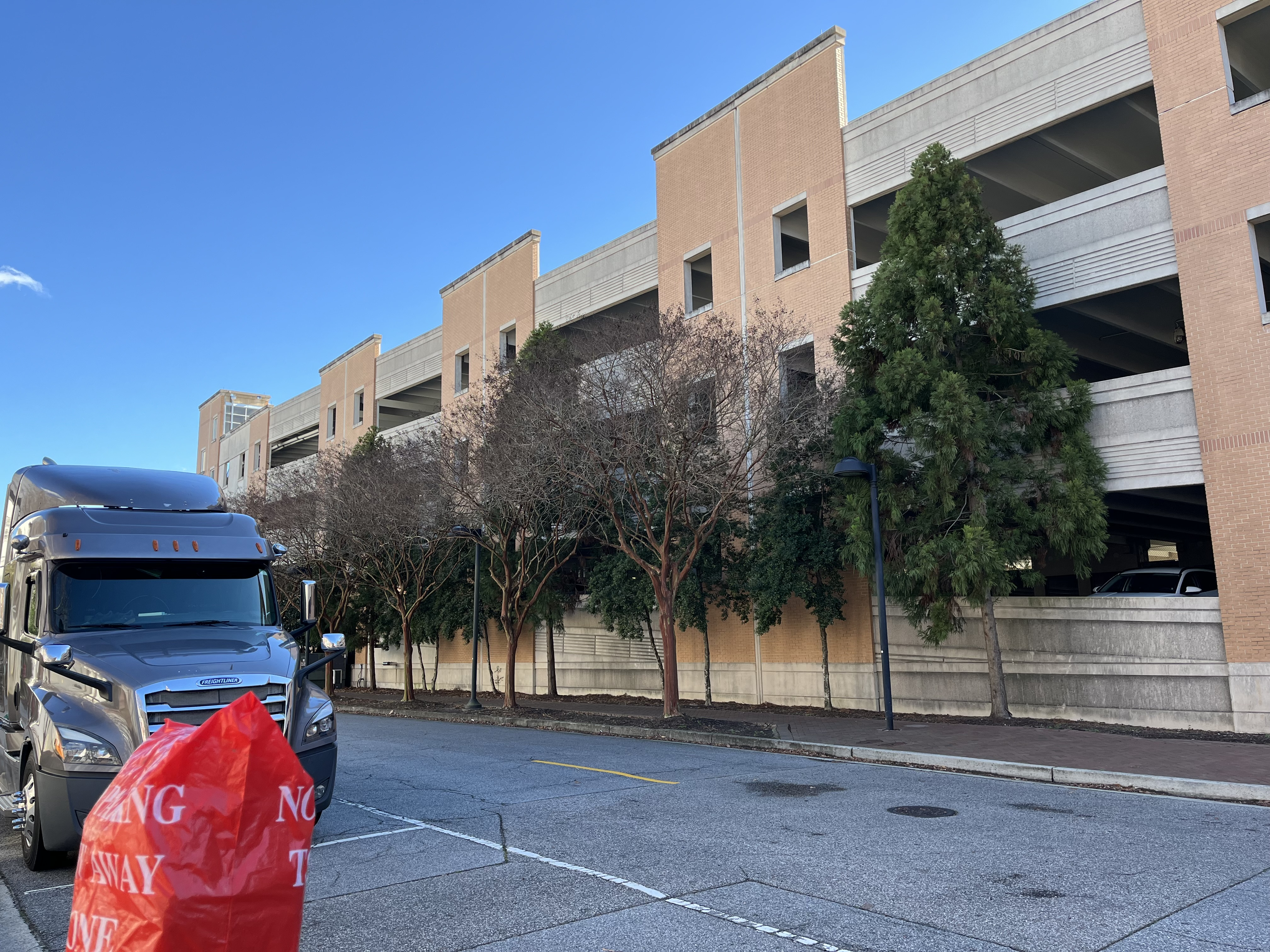
These trees and parking garage mark the location of a former station at ODU's convocation center. The maglev used to be parked here before being moved to Powhatan Avenue.

According to an ODU press report, the maglev system would have featured a singular train that ran in intervals of four minutes, with a planned top speed of 40 miles per hour and a capacity of 140. It would have been free of cost to ride and would have featured 3 stations - one at the residence halls, one at the 43rd street garage, and one at the convocation center parking garage. The train levitated around half an inch off of the track. The length of the track was 1 kilometer, or around 3,200 feet.

== Criticism ==
The maglev system was criticized for remaining unfinished and for going through a high budget, with a couple sources calling it a $16 million flop and one calling it infamous. Old Dominion University students reportedly called it the "mag left" after it was reported the project would be left unfinished. Students were also critical of it being demolished, wondering why they would build it if it was never used and sad that an ODU landmark was being taken down.

== See also ==
- Tongji University - a college in China with a working maglev test track
- Morgantown Personal Rapid Transit - West Virginia University's on-campus public transit system
- Shanghai maglev - a maglev built around the same time that was often compared to the ODU maglev
