= UK Ultraspeed =

Proposed maglev train line in the UK

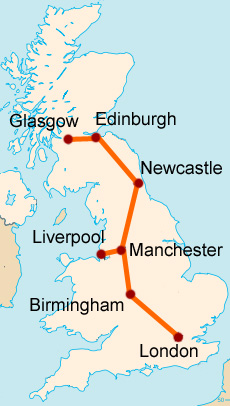
Map of the proposed line

UK Ultraspeed was a proposed high-speed magnetic-levitation train line between London and Glasgow, linking 16 stations including Edinburgh, Birmingham, Manchester and Newcastle and six airports. It was rejected in 2007 by the UK government, in favour of conventional high-speed rail. The company behind the proposal ceased efforts to promote it in early 2013.

== Proposal ==
The 2005 UK Ultraspeed proposal was submitted as part of the UK's general effort to upgrade train service. German company Transrapid, developers of the only operational high-speed maglev system, backed the Ultraspeed group to promote their technology as an alternative to conventional high-speed train sets like those being used on High Speed 1. Transrapid was a joint venture of Siemens and ThyssenKrupp, both major suppliers to the transportation industry.

The proposed 800 km (500 mi) route would have served cities currently served by both the West Coast Main Line and East Coast Main Line, with a spur serving Liverpool. Three stations were to serve London: Heathrow Airport, a Park and Ride at the M1/M25 junction, and either Stratford or King's Cross station. The route roughly followed the West Coast line from London to Manchester, then turned slightly east towards Newcastle before roughly following the East Coast line to Edinburgh and Glasgow.

Inter-city speeds would be as high as 500 km/h (310 mph), reducing a London-Manchester trip by half, from about 128 minutes to a claimed 54. The savings in time were possible due to rapid acceleration, new station locations, and greatly simplified loading and unloading procedures. These advantages would reduce total trip time to below that of regional aircraft serving the same route. The projected total cost was £29 billion including all guideways, land and 27 train sets.

Ultraspeed was deliberately aimed at the same market as the proposed High Speed 2 (HS2). HS2's mainline runs from London to Birmingham. In spite of being much shorter, at 531 km (330 mi), HS2 was estimated to cost between £52 billion (UK Government) and £80 billion (Institute of Economic Affairs).

== Initial support ==
The proposal caught the eye of then-Prime Minister Tony Blair, who was said to be clearly excited by it. This led to comments from the transport minister, Alistair Darling, that the issue of north–south links had to be re-considered. This was the latest in a series of flip-flops on the matter, which started with a 2004 report from the Strategic Rail Authority that stated that new high-speed line was "urgently needed", a report that the government had attempted to bury. Blair was noted as saying that a cross-country link of this sort would "bring Britain together", although this was called "pie in the sky" by critics. Alan James, director of UK Ultraspeed, took the opportunity to claim that it was the fastest and safest system in the world.

Competing political interests initially claimed that Blair's sudden support for the issue was nothing more than electioneering. However, this was soon followed by a Commons All-Party Rail Group visit to China and Japan to visit the maglev systems there. Shadow transport secretary Chris Grayling returned "positively bouncing with enthusiasm", noting that even at full speed the train was quieter than a Virgin Voyager. This led to full party support for the proposal on both sides of the aisle. Blair's support led to an official study into the Ultraspeed concept, as well as competing long-distance lines using TGV-like equipment.

This was all taking place just after the well-reported opening of the Shanghai system, and the announcement that the Chinese government was examining a 170 km extension of that line. Transrapid was also actively pitching the system for several other lines. It appeared that the maglev's day had finally come. It was also noted that the maglev system had originally been invented in the UK, and the first maglev system built and operated there – the Birmingham Maglev of 1984.

== Scepticism ==
Shortly after James' comments on safety, the Transrapid test facility in Emsland suffered the fatal Lathen train collision in late 2006. This quickly revealed "major safety failings" and led to the German transport minister asking "whether the Transrapid's safety measures were adequate". The company quickly responded by noting the accident had nothing to do with the technical aspects of the system.

When Ultraspeed was being proposed, only two Transrapid tracks existed; the original Emsland test facility, and the 30.5 km (19.0 mi) Shanghai Maglev Train. Transrapid was also part of a number of other active proposals at the time, notably a 37 km (23 mi) airport link in Munich similar to the Shanghai installation. All of these were much shorter than the Ultraspeed line, so there was an increased element of technical risk involved in the UK proposal.

Much of the proposal's claimed advantage was based on the cost of installing the tracks. As the maglev line is elevated, many of the problems with ground-based high-speed rail are mitigated. There is no need to fence off an area on either side of the track, and the total amount of land removed from use is lower, as farming can take place below the track. The Ultraspeed promoters claimed the cost would be £20M–24.75M per kilometre, about the same as Shanghai's £28M/km, and dramatically lower than High Speed 1's known £46M–48M/km price. However, rail experts were quick to point out that the actual price of the Shanghai system was £33M/mile, or £21M/km. This was in stark contrast to the known $11M/mile (~$7M/km) cost of recent extensions to the French TGV network.

More damning was the Munich system's rapidly inflating price throughout this period, from the original €1.85bn complete with train sets and stations, to a new price of €3.4bn. Most of the increase was attributed to increased costs of track construction. The cost overruns alone, €1.85bn, represented €50M/km which is more than the predicted cost per km in the Ultraspeed system. Cost overruns on the Munich system ultimately led to its cancellation.

As part of the preparation for a major white paper on the topic, in early 2007 the government commissioned Roderick Smith and Roger Kemp to study the Ultraspeed proposal in depth. In addition to the issues with technical risk and cost estimates, they noted that once other factors were considered a number of the secondary advantages of the system either did not exist or were actually the opposite of those claimed.

For instance, the promoters were claiming that the much higher speeds of the Ultraspeed system would allow it to take some traffic off aircraft, in contrast to other high-speed routes where aircraft traffic was actually seen to increase after the rail links opened. As a result, total CO_{2} emissions would be lowered. However, the reviewers said that the total CO_{2} emissions of the system, largely due to the coal-based electricity that would provide the majority of the power, were higher than conventional high-speed rail. More importantly, the suburban locations of the new stations that were part of the proposal would mean travellers would drive to the stations. Such was the case for the Shanghai system, where the end stations are "in the middle of nowhere". Total CO_{2} emissions on inter-city trips were predicted to be higher than a car making the same trip.

== Cancellation ==
The official white paper, "Delivering a Sustainable Railway", was published on 24 July 2007. It strongly rejected the Ultraspeed proposal, outlining a wide variety of reasons. Primary among these was the estimated construction costs of £60 billion, over double that predicted by the company, and more in-line with known costs from the Munich system.

The promoters responded with a note demonstrating that a major amount of the additional costs in the government estimate, £29 billion, were due to "excluded land-take", and that these were not included in the estimates for the competing HS2 proposal. Their complaints fell on deaf ears, and despite numerous attempts to have this issue reconsidered, HS2 continued to move forward. The company eventually gave up, and ceased operations in 2013.

After decades of development and sales efforts, the Transrapid group also decided to fold operations starting in 2010. In 2012, the Emsland track and the associated factories and facilities were slated for removal or redevelopment.

== Hypothetical journey times ==
Hypothetical journey times in minutes compared with present journey times by train. The table also includes the hypothetical journey times of High Speed 2.

Between	Present time	High Speed 2 time^{a}	Ultraspeed time^{b}
London and Birmingham	84 minutes	49 minutes	30 minutes
London and Manchester	128 minutes	68 minutes^{c}	54 minutes
London and Liverpool	128 minutes	96 minutes^{c}	73 minutes
London and Leeds	132 minutes	82 minutes^{c}	74 minutes
London and Glasgow	248 minutes	218 minutes^{c}	160 minutes
Manchester and Liverpool	50 minutes	N/A^{c}	18 minutes
Manchester and Leeds	54 minutes	N/A^{c}	19 minutes

^aHigh Speed 2 times based on limited stopping service with 1, 2 or 3 stops depending on the route.
^bUltraspeed times include stopping at every intermediate station.
^cNot part of the current proposed route for High Speed 2.

== See also ==
- High Speed 1
- High Speed 2
- High-speed rail in the United Kingdom
- List of maglev train proposals
- Vactrain
