= Transrapid =

German developed high-speed monorail train

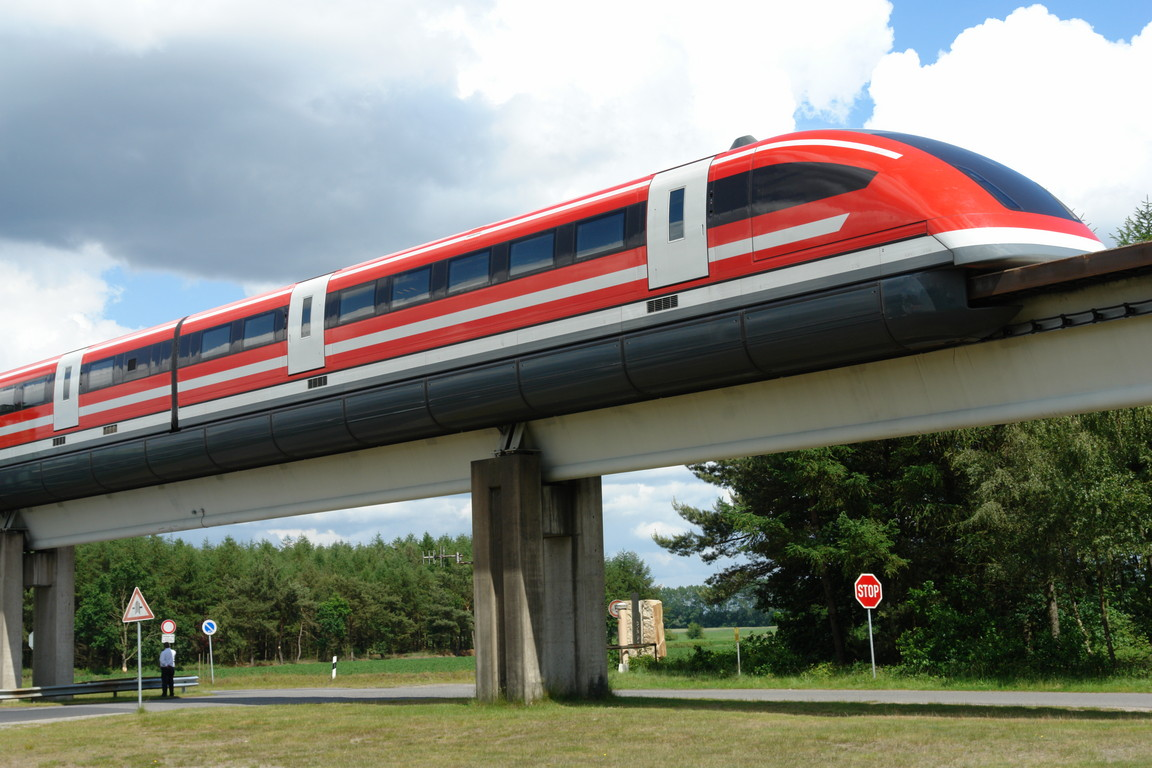
Transrapid 09 at the Emsland test facility in Germany

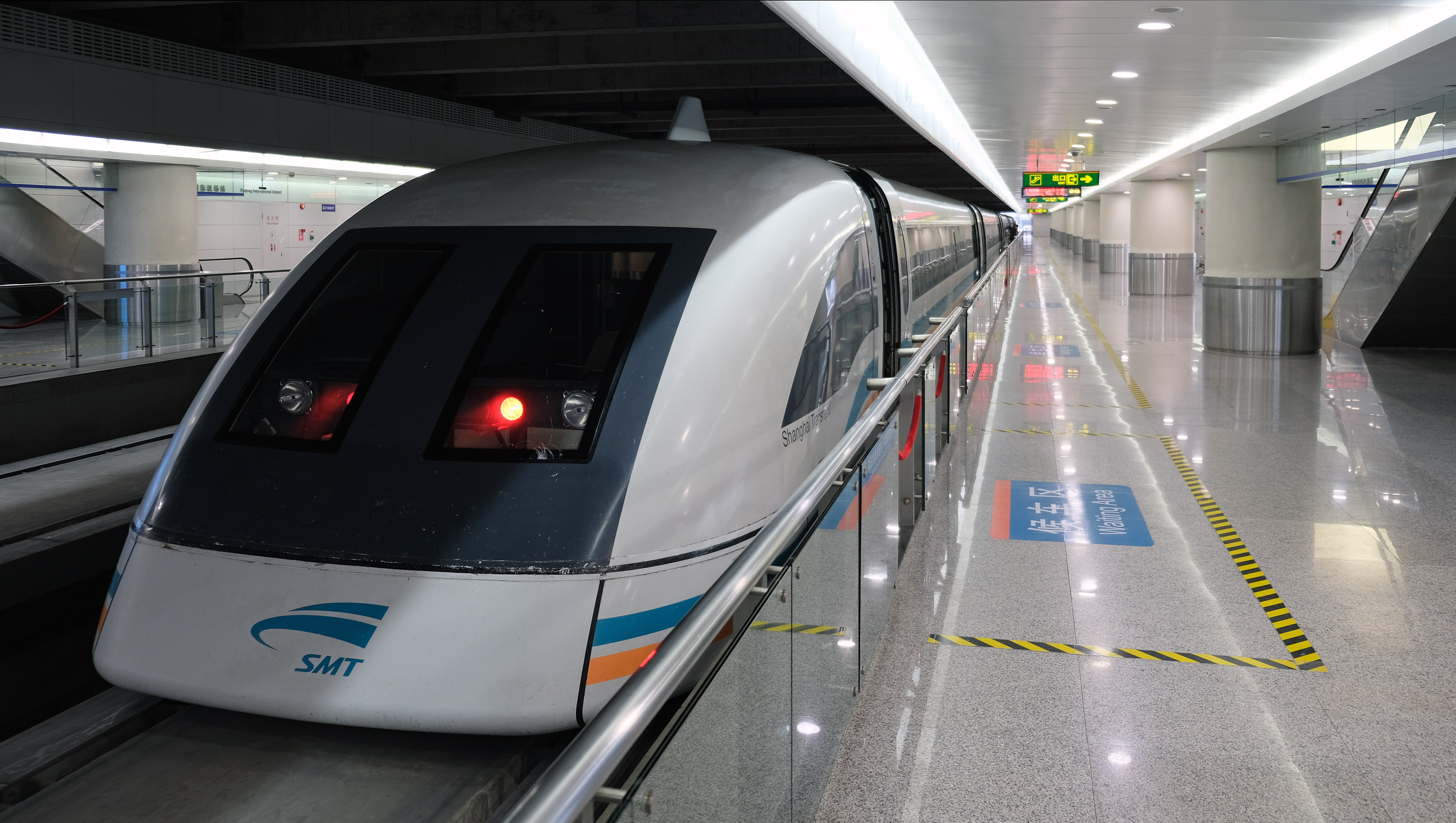
Transrapid SMT train in Shanghai

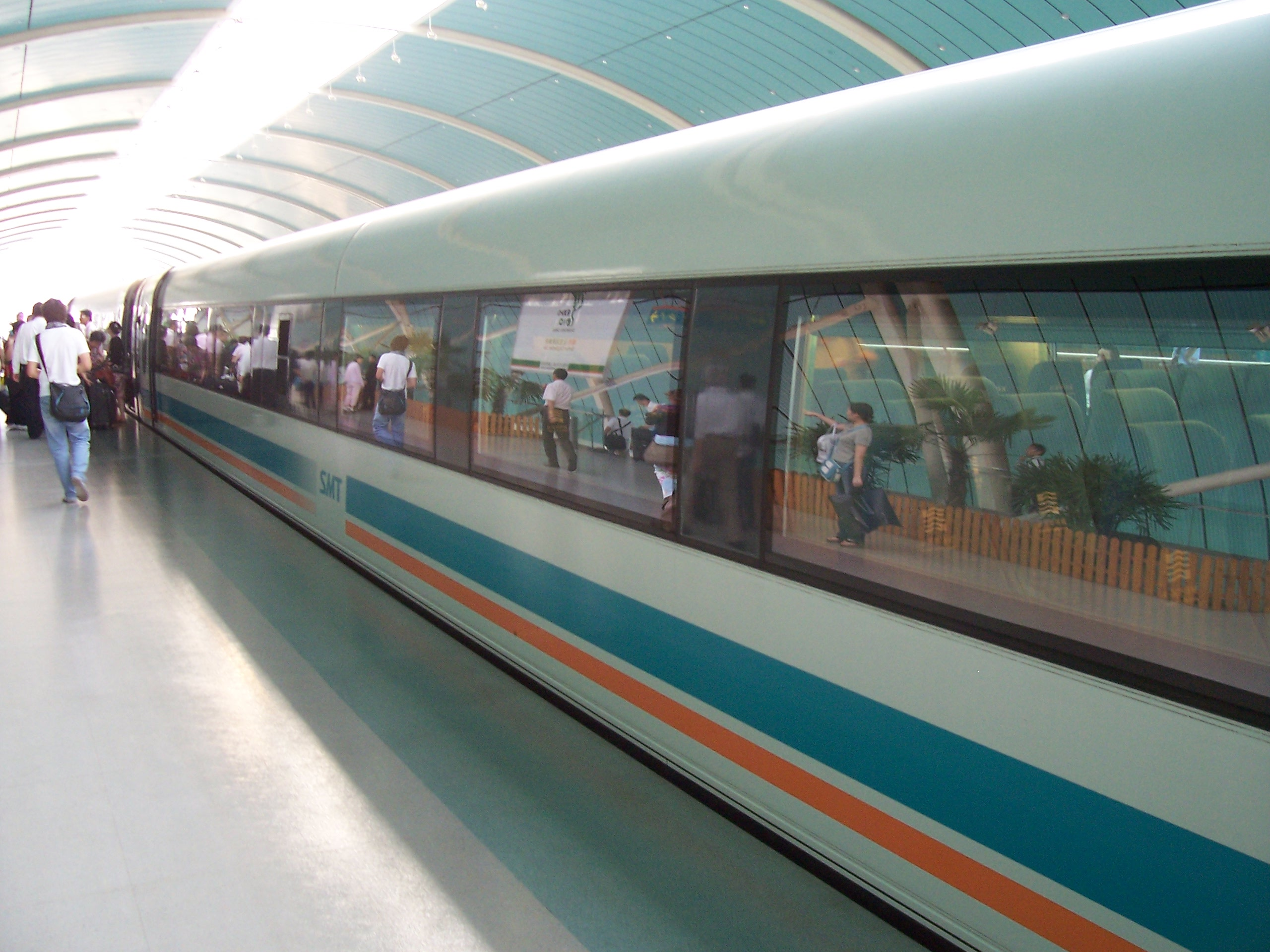
Transrapid SMT train in Shanghai

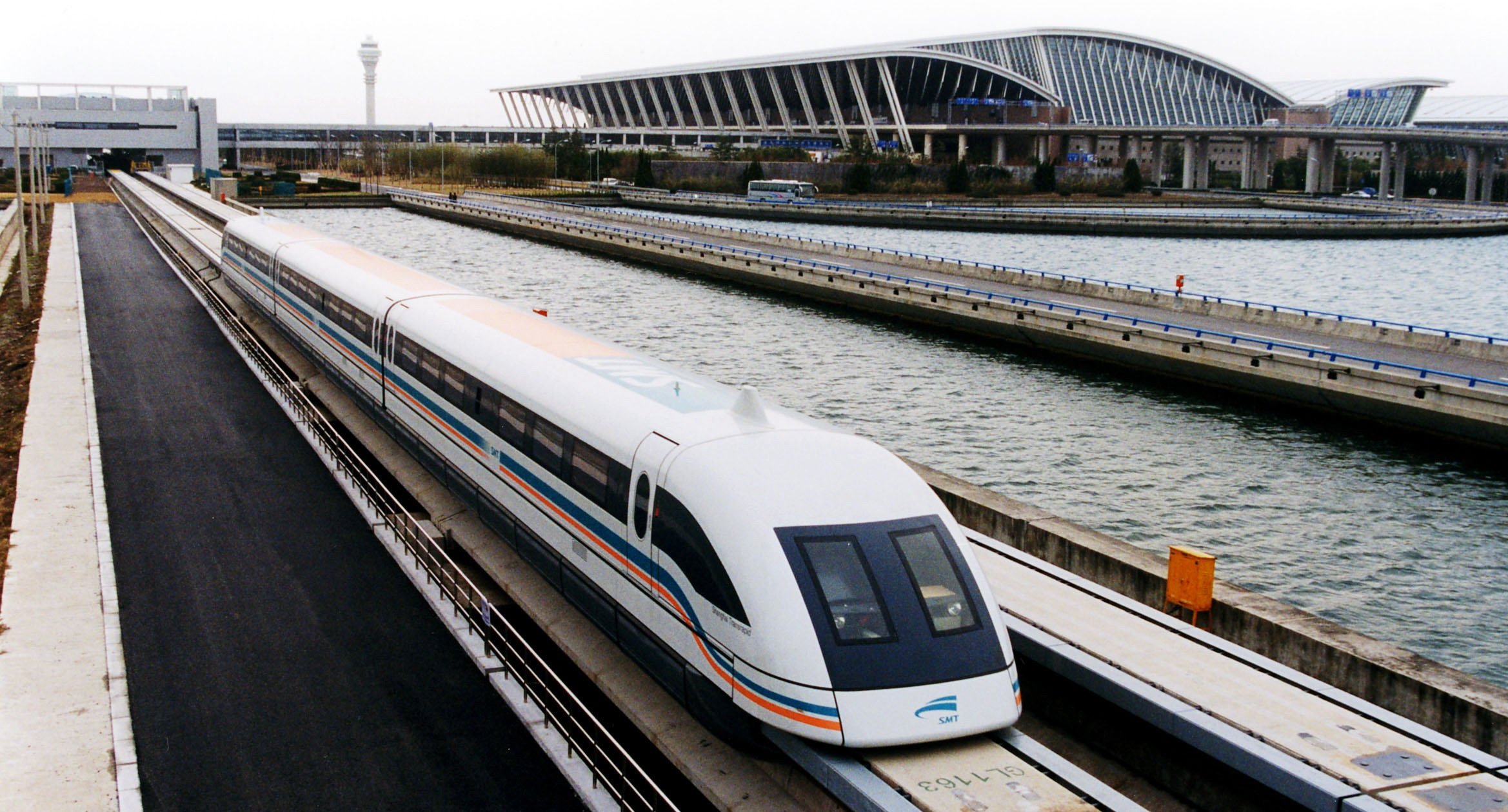
Transrapid SMT train in Shanghai

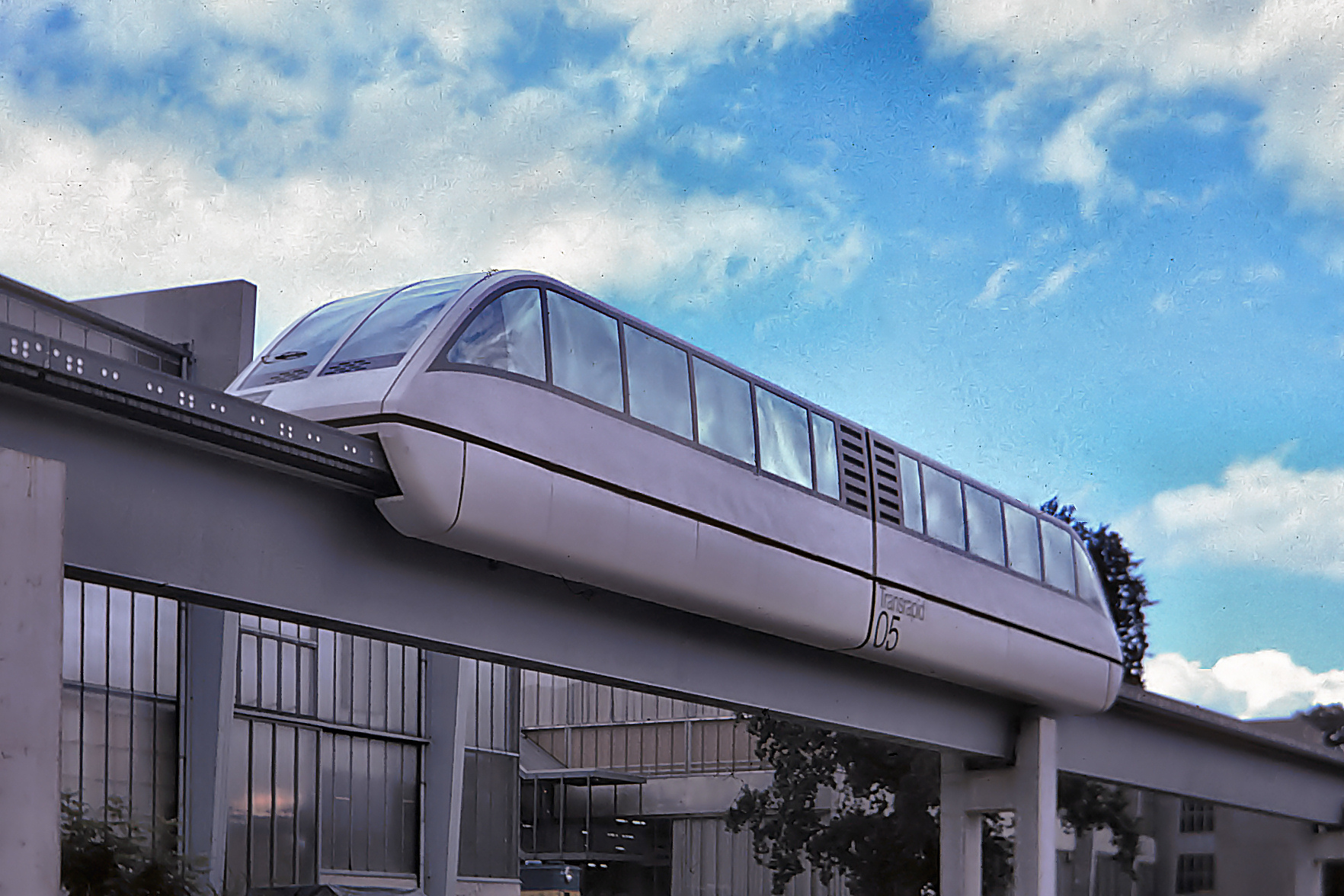
Transrapid 05 at ThyssenKrupp

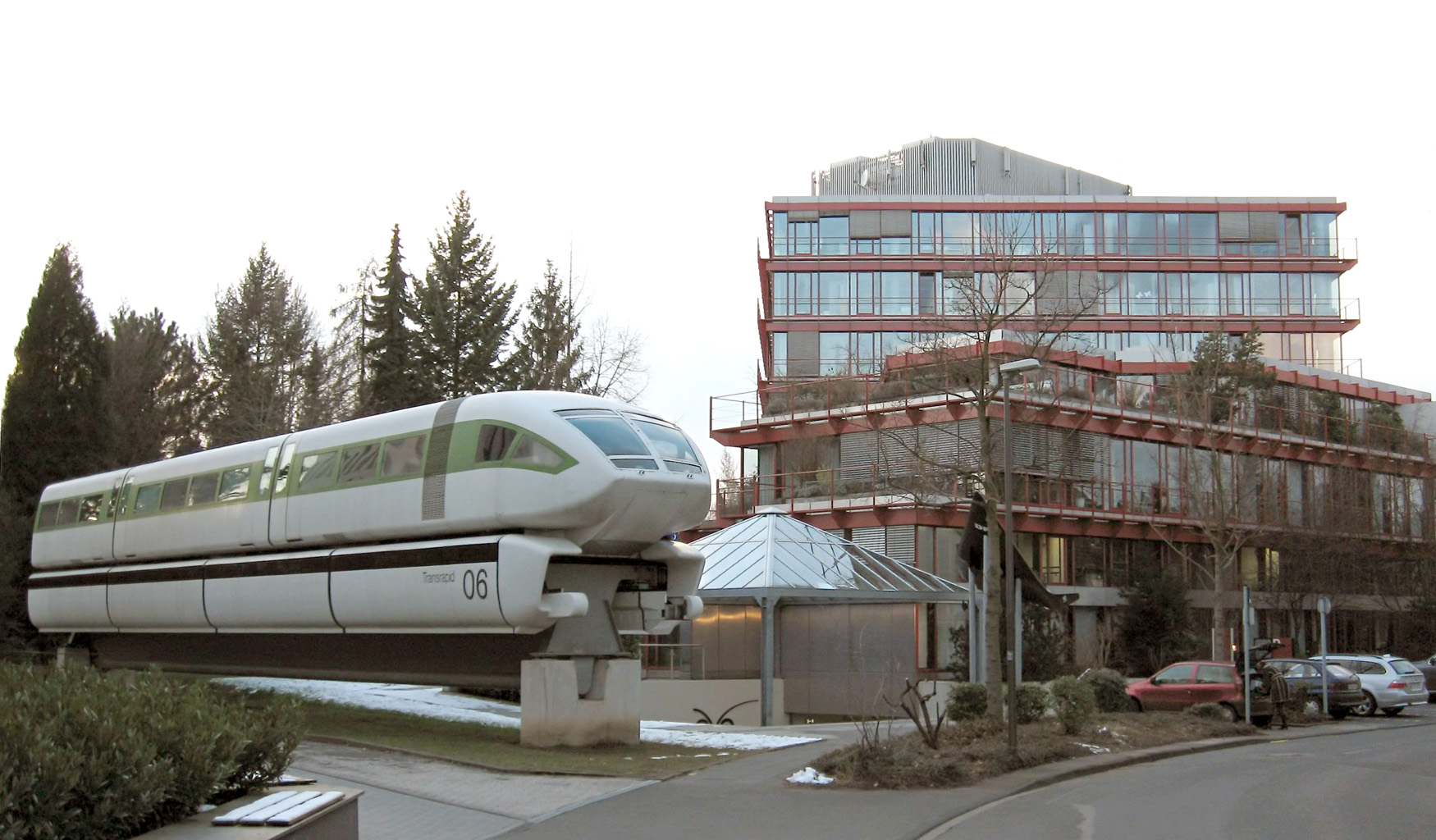
Section II of Transrapid 06 in Deutsches Museum Bonn

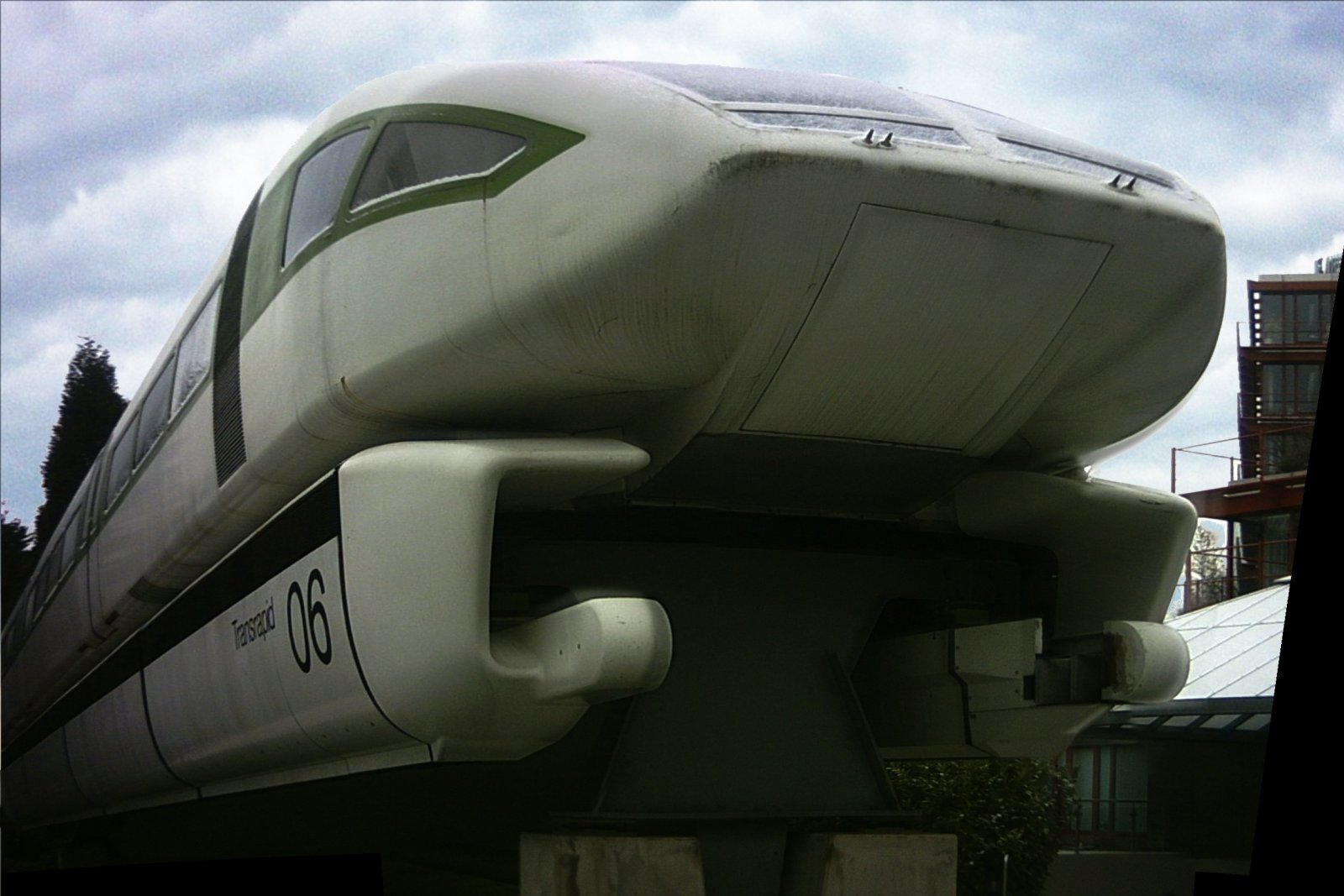
Transrapid 06

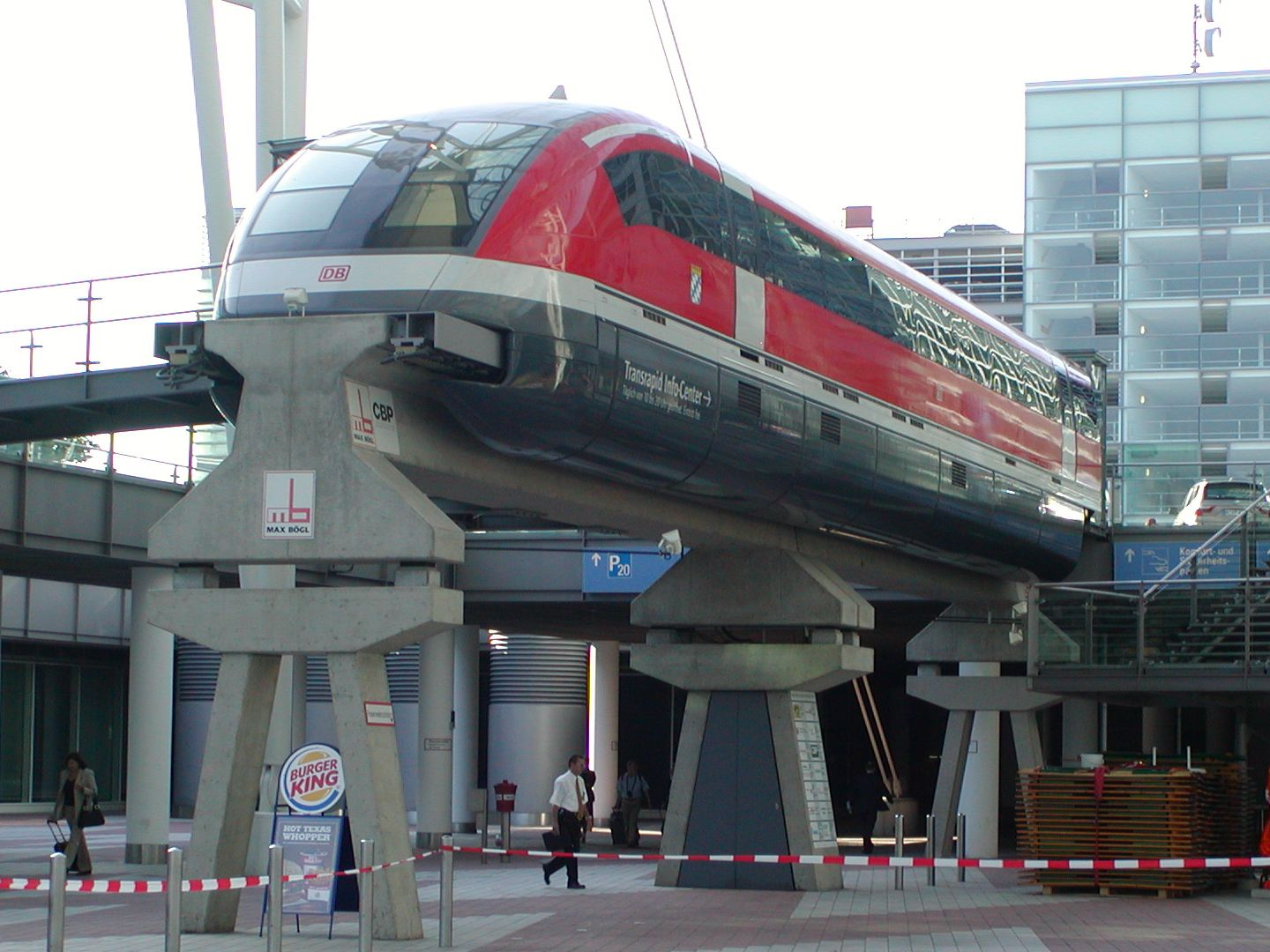
Section I of Transrapid 07 on display at Munich Airport

Transrapid (German: [tʁansʁaˈpiːt]) is a German-developed high-speed train using magnetic levitation. Planning for the system started in the late 1960s, with a test facility in Emsland, Germany, inaugurated in 1983. In 1991, technical readiness for application was approved by the Deutsche Bundesbahn in cooperation with universities.

The last version, the 2007-built Transrapid 09, is designed for a cruising speed of 505 km/h (314 mph) and allows acceleration and deceleration of approximately 1 m/s^{2} (3.6 km/h/s; 2.2 mph/s).

In 2002, the first commercial implementation was completed – the Shanghai maglev train, which connects the city of Shanghai's rapid transit network 30.5 km (18.95 mi) to Shanghai Pudong International Airport. The Transrapid system has not yet been deployed on a long-distance intercity line.

The system was developed and marketed by Siemens and ThyssenKrupp, as well as other, mostly German companies.

In 2006, a Transrapid train collided with a maintenance vehicle on the German test track, leading to 23 fatalities.

In 2011, the Emsland test track closed down when its operating license expired. In early 2012, demolition and reconversion of the entire Emsland site including the factory was approved, but was delayed until late 2023 because of concepts for usage as a Hyperloop test track or a maglev track for the Chinese CRRC Maglev.

The development of the Transrapid system in Germany has been carried forward in some form by the company Max Bögl, which has developed the Transport System Bögl for short range maglev tracks.

== Technology ==
=== Levitation ===
The super-speed Transrapid maglev system has no wheels, no axles, no gear transmissions, no steel rails, and no overhead electrical pantographs. The maglev vehicles do not roll on wheels; rather, they hover above the track guideway, using the attractive magnetic force between two linear arrays of electromagnetic coils—one side of the coil on the vehicle, the other side in the track guideway, which function together as a magnetic dipole. During levitation and travelling operation, the Transrapid maglev vehicle floats on a frictionless magnetic cushion with no mechanical contact whatsoever with the track guideway. On-board vehicle electronic systems measure the dipole gap distance 100,000 times per second to guarantee the clearance between the coils attached to the underside of the guideway and the magnetic portion of the vehicle wrapped around the guideway edges. With this precise, constantly updated electronic control, the dipole gap remains nominally constant at 10 millimetres (0.39 in). When levitated, the maglev vehicle has about 15 centimetres (5.9 in) of clearance above the guideway surface.

The Transrapid maglev vehicle requires less power to hover than it needs to run its on-board air conditioning equipment.

In Transrapid vehicle versions TR08 and earlier, when travelling at speeds below 80 kilometres per hour (50 mph), the vehicle levitation system and all on-board vehicle electronics were supplied with power through physical connections to the track guideway. At vehicle speeds above 80 kilometres per hour (50 mph), all on-board power was supplied by recovered harmonic oscillation of the magnetic fields created from the track's linear stator. (Since these oscillations are parasitic, they cannot be used for vehicle propulsion). A new energy transmission system, version TR09, has since been developed for Transrapid, in which maglev vehicles now require no physical contact with the track guideway for their on-board power needs, regardless of the maglev vehicle speed. This feature helps to reduce on-going maintenance and operational costs.

In case of power failure of the track's propulsion system, the maglev vehicle can use on-board backup batteries to temporarily power the vehicle's levitation system.

=== Propulsion ===
The Transrapid maglev system uses a synchronous longstator linear motor for both propulsion and braking. It works like a rotating electric motor whose stator is "unrolled" along the underside of the guideway; instead of producing torque (rotation) it produces a linear force along its length. The electromagnets in the maglev vehicle which lift it also work as the equivalent of the excitation portion (rotor) of this linear electric motor. Since the magnetic travelling field works in only one direction, if there were to be several maglev trains on a given track section, they would all travel in the same direction thereby reducing the possibility of collision between moving trains.

=== Energy requirements ===
The normal energy consumption of the Transrapid is approximately 50 to 100 kilowatts (67 to 134 hp) per section for levitation and travel, and vehicle control. The drag coefficient of the Transrapid is about 0.26. The aerodynamic drag of the vehicle, which has a frontal cross section of 16 m^{2} (172 sq ft), requires a power consumption, at 400 km/h (249 mph) or 111 m/s (364 ft/s) cruising speed, given by the following formula:

$P = c_w \cdot A_{\rm Front} \cdot v^3 \cdot (\mbox{density of surrounding air})/2$

$$\begin{matrix}
P &=& 0{.}26 \cdot 16\,\mathrm{m}^2 \cdot (111\,\mathrm{m}/\mathrm{s})^3 \cdot 1{.}24\,\mathrm{kg}/\mathrm{m}^3 /2 \\
P &=& 3{.}53\cdot10^6\,\mathrm{kg}\cdot\mathrm{m}^2/\mathrm{s}^3 = 3{.}53\cdot10^6\,\mathrm{N}\cdot\mathrm{m}/\mathrm{s} = 3{.}53\,\mathrm{MW}
\end{matrix}$$

Power consumption compares favourably with other high-speed rail systems. With an efficiency of 0.85, the power required is about 4.2 MW. Energy consumption for levitation and guidance purposes equates to approximately 1.7 kW/t. As the propulsion system is also capable of functioning in reverse, energy is transferred back into the electrical grid during braking. An exception to this is when an emergency stop is performed using the emergency landing skids beneath the vehicle, although this method of bringing the vehicle to a stop is intended only as a last resort should it be impossible or undesirable to keep the vehicle levitating on back-up power to a natural halt.

=== Market segment and historical parallels ===
Compared to classical railway lines, Transrapid allows higher speeds and gradients with less weathering and lower energy consumption and maintenance needs. The Transrapid track is more flexible, and more easily adapted to specific geographical circumstances than a classical train system. Cargo is restricted to a maximum payload of 15 tonnes (14.8 long tons; 16.5 short tons) per car. Transrapid allows maximum speeds of 550 km/h (342 mph), placing it between conventional high speed trains (200–320 km/h or 124–199 mph) and air traffic (720–990 km/h or 447–615 mph). The magnetic field generator, an important part of the engine being a part of the track, limits the system capacity.

From a competition standpoint, the Transrapid is a proprietary solution. The track being a part of the engine, only the single-source Transrapid vehicles and infrastructure can be operated. There is no multisourcing foreseen concerning vehicles or the highly complicated crossings and switches. Unlike classical railways or other infrastructure networks, as jointly administrated by the Federal Network Agency (Bundesnetzagentur) in Germany, a Transrapid system does not allow any direct competition.

=== Ecological impact ===
The Transrapid is an electrically driven, clean, high-speed, high-capacity means of transport able to build up point-to-point passenger connections in geographically challenged surroundings. This has to be set in comparison with the impact on heritage and or landscape protection areas (compare Waldschlösschen Bridge). Any impact of emissions has to take into account the source of electrical energy. The reduced expense, noise and vibration of a people-only Transrapid system versus a cargo train track is not directly comparable. The reuse of existing tracks and the interfacing with existing networks is limited. The Transrapid indirectly competes for resources, space and tracks in urban and city surroundings with classical urban transport systems and high speed trains.

=== Comparative costs ===
==== Track construction cost ====
The fully elevated Shanghai Maglev was built at a cost of US$1.33 billion over a length of 30.5 kilometres (19.0 mi) including trains and stations. Thus the cost per km for dual track was US$43.6 million, including trains and stations. This was the first commercial use of the technology. Since then conventional fast rail track has been mass-produced in China for between US$4.6 and US$30.8 million per kilometer, mostly in rural areas. (See High-speed rail in China).

In 2008 Transrapid Australia quoted the Victoria State Government A$34 million per kilometer for dual track. This assumed 50% of the track was at grade and 50% was elevated. In comparison, the 47 kilometres (29 mi) Regional Rail Link built in Victoria cost around A$5 billion, or A$105 million per kilometer, including two stations.

From the above it is not possible to say whether Transrapid or conventional fast rail track would be cheaper for a particular application.

The higher operating speed of the maglev system will result in more passengers being delivered over the same distance in a set time. The ability of the Transrapid system to handle tighter turns and steeper gradients could heavily influence a cost comparison for a particular project.

==== Train purchase cost ====
In 2008, Transrapid Australia quoted the Victorian State Government between A$16.5 million (commuter) and A$20 million (luxury) per trains section or carriage. Due to the 3.7 m (12 ft 2 in) width of the Transrapid carriages they have a floor area of about 92 square meters (990 square feet). This works out at between A$179,000 and A$217,000 per square meter.

In comparison, InterCityExpress which are also built by Siemens cost about A$6 million per carriage. Due to the 2.9 m (9 ft 6 in) width of the ICE carriages they have a floor area of about 72 square meters (775 square feet). This works out at about A$83,000 per square meter.

This shows Transrapid train sets are likely to cost over twice as much as ICE 3 conventional fast rail train sets at this time. However, each Transrapid train set is more than twice as efficient due to their faster operating speed and acceleration according to UK Ultraspeed. In their case study only 44% as many Transrapid train sets are needed to deliver the same number of passengers as conventional high-speed trains.

==== Operational cost ====
Transrapid claims their system has very low maintenance costs compared to conventional high speed rail systems due to the non-contact nature of their system.

== Implementations ==
=== China ===
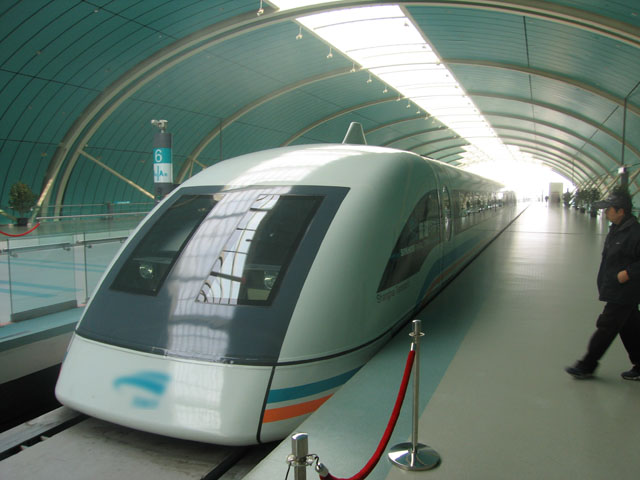
Transrapid magnetic levitation train in Shanghai, connecting Longyang Road Station to Pudong International Airport

A full trip on a train from Longyang Road Station to Pudong International Airport Station and back

The only commercial implementation so far was in 2000, when the Chinese government ordered a Transrapid track to be built connecting Shanghai to its Pudong International Airport. It was inaugurated in 2002 and regular daily trips started in March 2004. Prior to May 2021, the travel speed was 431 km/h (268 mph), which the Maglev train maintained for 50 seconds. The current travel speed is 300 km/h (186 mph). The short, 30.5 km (18.95 mi) track only allows the cruising speed to be maintained for a short time before deceleration must begin. The average number of riders per day (14 hours of operation) is about 7,500, while the maximum seating capacity per train is 440. A second class ticket price of about 50 RMB (renminbi) (about 6 euro) is four times the price of the airport bus and ten times more expensive than a comparable underground ticket.

The project was sponsored by the German Hermes loans with DM 200 million. The total cost is believed to be $1.33 billion.

A planned extension of the line to Shanghai Hongqiao Airport (35 km or 22 mi) and onward to the city of Hangzhou (175 km or 109 mi) has been repeatedly delayed. Originally planned to be ready for Expo 2010, final approval was granted on 18 August 2008, and construction was scheduled to start in 2010 for completion in 2014. However the plan was cancelled, possibly due to the building of the high speed Shanghai–Hangzhou Passenger Railway.Since 2020, this extension was proposed again.

=== Germany ===
The Emsland test facility was the only Transrapid track in Germany. It has been deactivated, and is scheduled to be disassembled. Nevertheless, there are plans to either use it as a test facility for the CRRC 600 or to reconstruct it in order to serve as a Hyperloop track.

== Proposed systems ==
=== Iran ===
In 2007, Iran and a German company reached an agreement on using maglev trains to link the cities of Tehran and Mashhad. The agreement was signed at the Mashhad International Fair site between Iranian Ministry of Roads and Transportation and the German company. This project was abandoned in May 2010.

=== Switzerland ===
In 2011, SwissRapide AG in co-operation with the SwissRapide Consortium was developing and promoting an above-ground magnetic levitation (Maglev) monorail system, based on the Transrapid technology. The first projects planned were the lines Bern–Zürich, Lausanne–Geneva as well as Zürich–Winterthur. This became unfeasible by February 2014.

=== United States ===
==== Colorado I-70 ====
Transrapid is one of a number of companies seeking to build a 120 mi (190 km) high speed transit system parallel to the I-70 Interstate in the US state of Colorado. Submissions put forward say that maglev offers significantly better performance than rail given the harsh climate and terrain. No technology had been preferred as of November 2013, though construction was slated to begin in 2020. The I-70 was widened instead of this plan.

==== Los Angeles to Las Vegas ====
The California–Nevada Interstate Maglev project is a proposed 269 mi (433 km) line from Las Vegas, Nevada to Anaheim, California. One segment would run from Las Vegas to Primm, Nevada, with proposed service to the Las Vegas area's forthcoming Ivanpah Valley Airport. The top speed would be 310 mph (500 km/h). In August 2014, the backers of the scheme unsuccessfully sought to revive interest.

==== Other ====
There have been several other evaluations conducted in the US, including Washington, DC, to Baltimore; Chattanooga to Atlanta; and Pittsburgh to Philadelphia.

=== Canary Islands ===
A two line, 120-kilometers (75-mile) long system has been proposed for the island of Tenerife. It would connect the island capital Santa Cruz in the north with Costa Adeje in the south and Los Realejos in the northwest with a maximum speed of 270 km/h (169 mph). The estimated cost is €3 billion. Transrapid has advantages over a conventional rail plans which would require 35% of its route in tunnels because of the steep terrain on the island. This project was abandoned in 2011.

== Rejected systems ==
=== Germany ===
==== High-speed competition ====
The Transrapid originated as one of several competing concepts for new land-based high-speed public transportation developed in Germany. In this competition, the Transrapid primarily competed with the InterCityExpress (ICE), a high-speed rail system based on "traditional" railway technology. The ICE “won” in that it was adopted nationwide in Germany, however Transrapid development continued. A number of studies for possible Transrapid lines were conducted after the ICE had entered service, including a long-distance line from Hamburg to Berlin.

==== Munich link ====
The most recent German Transrapid line project, and the one that came closest to being built, having previously been approved, was an airport connection track from Munich Central Station to Munich Airport, a 40-kilometre (25 mi) project. The connection between the train station and airport was close to being built, but was cancelled on 27 March 2008 by the German government, due to a massive overrun in costs. Prior to the cancellation, the governing party, the Christian Social Union of Bavaria (CSU), faced internal and local resistance, in particular from communities along the proposed route. The CSU had planned to position Transrapid as an example of future technology and innovation in Bavaria. German federal transport minister Wolfgang Tiefensee announced the decision after a crisis meeting in Berlin at which industry representatives reportedly revealed that costs had risen from €1.85 billion to well over €3 billion ($4.7 billion). This rise in projected costs, however was mostly due to the cost estimates of the construction of the tunnel and related civil engineering after the designated operator Deutsche Bahn AG shifted most of the risk-sharing towards its subcontractors - and not due to the cost of the maglev technology.

=== United Kingdom ===
The Transrapid was rejected in 2007 by the UK government for a maglev link called UK Ultraspeed between London and Glasgow, via Birmingham, Liverpool/Manchester, Leeds, Teesside, Newcastle and Edinburgh.

== Incidents ==
=== September 2006 accident ===
On 22 September 2006, a Transrapid train collided with a maintenance vehicle at 170 km/h (106 mph) on the test track in Lathen, Germany. The maintenance vehicle destroyed the first section of the train, then lifted off the track to complete two full rotations before landing in a pile of pre-exploded debris. This was the first major accident involving a Transrapid train. The news media reported 23 fatalities and that several people were severely injured, these being the first fatalities on any maglev. The accident was caused by human error with the first train being allowed to leave the station before the maintenance vehicle had moved off the track. This situation could be avoided in a production environment by installing an automatic collision avoidance system.

=== SMT fire accident ===
On 11 August 2006, a Transrapid train running on the Shanghai Maglev Line caught fire. The fire was quickly put out by Shanghai's firefighters. It was reported that the vehicle's on-board batteries may have caused the fire.

== Alleged theft of Transrapid technology ==
In April 2006, new announcements by Chinese officials planning to cut maglev rail costs by a third stirred some strong comments by various German officials and more diplomatic statements of concern from Transrapid officials. Deutsche Welle reported that the China Daily had quoted the State Council encouraging engineers to "learn and absorb foreign advanced technologies while making further innovations." The Chinese deny any technology plagiarism. The China Aviation Industry Corporation has said the new Chinese "Zhui Feng" maglev train is not dependent on foreign technology. They also claim it is much lighter than the Transrapid product and features a much more advanced design. The "Zhui Feng" is a low speed maglev design currently in use on the Changsha Maglev Express.

== Development history and versions ==
| Date | Train | Location | Present location | Comments | Top speed (km/h) |
|---|---|---|---|---|---|
| 1969 / 1970 ? | Transrapid 01 | Munich | Deutsches Museum, Munich | By Krauss-Maffei. Indoor benchtop model. Only 600 mm long track. | |
| 6 May 1971 | MBB Prinzipfahrzeug | MBB's Ottobrunn factory (near Munich), Germany | Freilassing Locomotive World | By MBB. First passenger-carrying principle vehicle. 660 m test track. Prinzipfahrzeug=principle [demonstrator] vehicle. | 90 (1971) |
| 6 October 1971 | Transrapid 02 | Krauss-Maffei's plant in Munich - Allach, Germany | Krauss-Maffei, Munich | By Krauss-Maffei. 930 m test track which included one curve. Displayed at Paris Expo from 4 June to 9 June 1973. | 164 (October 1971) |
| 16 August 1972 | Transrapid 03 | Munich | Scrapped | By Krauss-Maffei. Air-cushion vehicle (ACV or hovercraft) propelled by a linear motor. The system was abandoned in 1973 due to the too high noise generation and the too large consumption. Attempts in France (Aérotrain) and in the USA () led in the following years to similar decisions. 930 m test track. | 140 (September 1972) |
| 1972 / 1974 ? | Erlangener Erprobungsträger (EET 01) | Southern edge of Erlangen (near Nuremberg), Germany | ? | By Siemens and others. Electrodynamic suspension (EDS) (like JR-Maglev). Unmanned. 880 m circular track. Erlangener Erprobungsträger=Erlangen test carrier. | 160 / 230 (1974) ? |
| 20 December 1973 | Transrapid 04 | Munich - Allach, Germany | Technik Museum Speyer | By Krauss-Maffei. | 250 (end 1973), 253.2 (21 November 1977) |
| 1974 / January 1975 ? | Komponentenmeßträger (KOMET) | Manching, Germany | near Lathen in a barn | By MBB. Unmanned. 1300 m track. | 401.3 (1974) |
| 1975 | HMB1 | Thyssen Henschel in Kassel, Germany | ? | By Thyssen Henschel. First functional longstator vehicle. 100 m guideway. Unmanned. | |
| 1976 | HMB2 | Thyssen Henschel in Kassel, Germany | Technik-Museum, Kassel | By Thyssen Henschel. World's first passenger-carrying, longstator vehicle. 100 m guide-way. | 36 (or 40 ?) |
| 17 May 1979 | Transrapid 05 | International Transportation Exhibition (IVA 79) in Hamburg. Reassembled in Kassel in 1980. | Technik-Museum, Kassel | 908 m track. | 75 |
| June 1983 | Transrapid 06 | Transrapid Versuchsanlage Emsland (TVE), Germany | A part is in Deutsches Museum at Bonn, other part in Lathen | Presented to public in Munich on 13 March 1983. 31.5 km track. | 302 (1984), 355 (1985), 392 (1987), 406 (1987), 412.6 (January 1988) |
| 1988 | Transrapid 07 | Transrapid Versuchsanlage Emsland (TVE), Germany | A part is at Eisenbahnmuseum Bochum (since 2024), the other part still resides in Lathen | Presented to public at the International Transportation Exhibition (IVA 88) in Hamburg. | 436 (15 December 1989), 450 (17 June 1993) |
| August 1999 | Transrapid 08 | Transrapid Versuchsanlage Emsland (TVE), Germany | One ending section destroyed 22 September 2006 in accident, remaining middle and ending section are stored in Lathen | | |
| 2002 | Transrapid SMT | Shanghai Maglev Train, China | Shanghai, China | slightly modified version of the Transrapid 08 | 501,5 (12 November 2003) |
| 2007 | Transrapid 09 | Transrapid Versuchsanlage Emsland (TVE), Germany | Kemper Factory in Nortrup | Offered for sale in October 2016 Five years after the shutdown of the Transrapid pilot plant Emsland in 2011, the Kemper family, the owners of H. Kemper GmbH & Co. KG, purchased the Transrapid 09 for €200,001. In September 2017, it was erected on the company premises in Nortrup. The three sections of the train is then used as conference and exhibition space for the history of the Transrapid. Hermann Kemper, the inventor of the maglev train, came from the same family as the owners of the sausage and meat products manufacturer Kemper. | |

== Company ==
Transrapid International GmbH & Co. KG
- Industry: Rolling stock
- Founded: 1998
- Defunct: 2008
- Owner: Siemens; ThyssenKrupp
- Website: transrapid.de at the Wayback Machine (archived 2006-02-02)

Transrapid International GmbH & Co. KG was a company between 1998 and 2008 to develop the Transrapid.

== See also ==
- Land speed record for railed vehicles
