= Super Bullet Maglev =

Experimental maglev train

- Designer: Southwest Jiaotong University
- Constructed: 2021–present

Specifications
- Train length: 21 metres (69 ft)
- Maximum speed: 620 kilometres per hour (390 mph)

The Super Bullet Maglev is an experimental Chinese high-speed maglev train, with a maximum designed speed of 620 km/h. Built by the Bavarian construction company Bögl together with a local Chinese partner, the prototype was unveiled on 13 January 2021 at a test track in Chengdu, Sichuan. The train uses liquid nitrogen to achieve superconductivity, according to the State Key Laboratory of Traction Power.
