= Ground-effect train =

Type of train

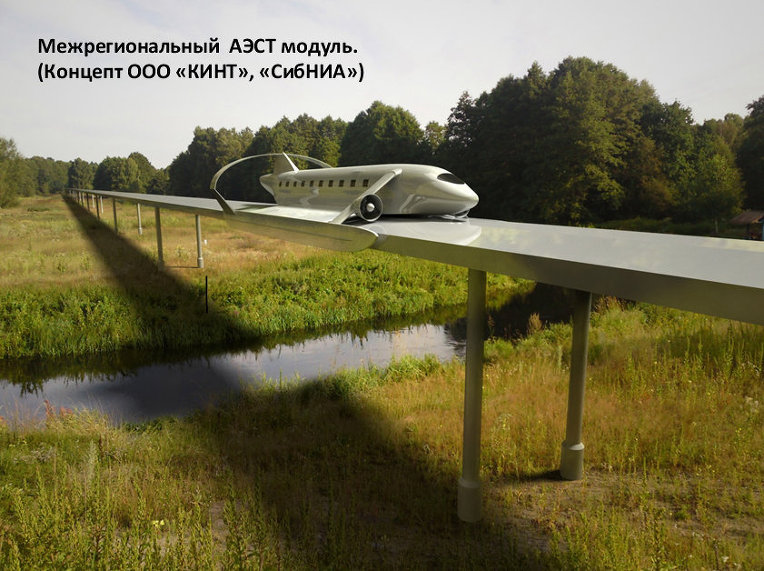
A ground-effect train (concept art)

A ground-effect train is a conceptualized alternative to a magnetic levitation (maglev) train. In both cases the objective is to prevent the vehicle from making contact with the ground. Whereas a maglev train accomplishes this through the use of magnetism, a ground-effect train uses an air cushion; either in the manner of a hovercraft (as in hovertrains) or using the wing–in–ground-effect design.

== Details ==
The advantages of a ground-effect train over a maglev are lower cost due to simpler construction. Disadvantages include either constant input of energy to keep the train hovering (in the case of hovercraft-like vehicles) or the necessity to keep the vehicle moving for it to remain off the ground (in the case of wing–in–ground-effect vehicles). Furthermore, these vehicles may be drastically affected by wind, air turbulence, and weather. Whereas the magnetic levitation train can be built to operate in a vacuum to minimise air resistance, the ground-effect train must operate in an atmosphere in order for the air cushion to exist.

Development work has been undertaken in several countries since the middle 20th century. No ground-effect train has entered regular commercial service.

Yusuke Sugahara and his team of researchers at Tohoku University, in Sendai, Japan have developed the Aero-Train that uses wings attached to a fuselage to fly inches off the ground. Dubbed a ground-effect vehicle the train is designed to be completely powered by wind and solar energy – making this a true zero-carbon transportation system.

== See also ==
- Aérotrain
- Gravity train
- Ground-effect vehicle
- High-speed rail
- Hovercraft
- Hovertrain
- Hyperloop
- Maglev train
- Transrapid 03
- Tracked Hovercraft
