= Magnetic bearing =

Bearing which supports loads using magnetic levitation

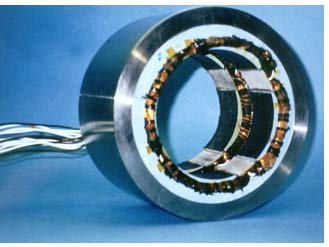
A magnetic bearing

A magnetic bearing is a type of bearing that supports a load using magnetic levitation. Magnetic bearings support moving parts without physical contact. For instance, they are able to levitate a rotating shaft and permit relative motion with very low friction and no mechanical wear. Magnetic bearings support the highest speeds of any kind of bearing and have no maximum relative speed.

Active bearings have several advantages: they do not suffer from wear, have low friction, and can often accommodate irregularities in the mass distribution automatically, allowing rotors to spin around their center of mass with very low vibration.

Passive magnetic bearings use permanent magnets and, therefore, do not require any input power but are difficult to design due to the limitations described by Earnshaw's theorem. Techniques using diamagnetic materials are relatively undeveloped and strongly depend on material characteristics. As a result, most magnetic bearings are active magnetic bearings, using electromagnets which require continuous power input and an active control system to keep the load stable. In a combined design, permanent magnets are often used to carry the static load and the active magnetic bearing is used when the levitated object deviates from its optimum position. Magnetic bearings typically require a back-up bearing in the case of power or control system failure.

Magnetic bearings are used in several industrial applications such as electrical power generation, petroleum refinement, machine tool operation and natural gas handling. They are also used in the Zippe-type centrifuge, for uranium enrichment and in turbomolecular pumps, where oil-lubricated bearings would be a source of contamination.

== Design ==
Basic operation for a single axis

An active magnetic bearing works on the principle of electromagnetic suspension based on the induction of eddy currents in a rotating conductor. When an electrically conducting material is moving in a magnetic field, a current will be generated in the material that counters the change in the magnetic field (known as Lenz's Law). This generates a current that will result in a magnetic field that is oriented opposite to the one from the magnet. The electrically conducting material is thus acting as a magnetic mirror.

The hardware consists of an electromagnet assembly, a set of power amplifiers which supply current to the electromagnets, a controller, and gap sensors with associated electronics to provide the feedback required to control the position of the rotor within the gap. The power amplifier supplies equal bias current to two pairs of electromagnets on opposite sides of a rotor. This constant tug-of-war is mediated by the controller, which offsets the bias current by equal and opposite perturbations of current as the rotor deviates from its center position.

The gap sensors are usually inductive in nature and sense in a differential mode. The power amplifiers in a modern commercial application are solid state devices which operate in a pulse-width modulation configuration. The controller is usually a microprocessor or digital signal processor.

Two types of instabilities are typically present in magnetic bearings. Attractive magnets produce an unstable static force that decreases with increasing distance and increases at decreasing distances. This can cause the bearing to become unbalanced. Secondly, because magnetism is a conservative force, it provides little damping; oscillations may cause loss of successful suspension if any driving forces are present.

== History ==
The table below lists several early patents for active magnetic bearings. Earlier patents for magnetic suspensions can be found but are excluded here because they consist of assemblies of permanent magnets of problematic stability per Earnshaw's Theorem.

Early U.S. patents in active magnetic bearings
Inventor(s)	Year	Patent number	Title
Beams, Holmes	1941	2,256,937	Suspension of Rotatable Bodies
Beams	1954	2,691,306	Magnetically Supported Rotating Bodies
Gilbert	1955	2,946,930	Magnetic suspension
Beams	1962	3,041,482	Apparatus for Rotating Freely Suspended Bodies
Beams	1965	3,196,694	Magnetic Suspension System
Wolf	1967	3,316,032	Poly-Phase Magnetic Suspension Transformer
Boden et al.	1968	DE1750602	Magnetische Lagerung (German patent)
Lyman	1971	3,565,495	Magnetic Suspension Apparatus
Habermann	1973	3,731,984	Magnetic Bearing Block Device for Supporting a Vertical Shaft Adapted for Rotating at High Speed
Habermann, Loyen, Joli, Aubert	1974	3,787,100	Devices Including Rotating Members Supported by Magnetic Bearings
Habermann, Brunet	1977	4,012,083	Magnetic Bearings
Habermann, Brunet, LeClére	1978	4,114,960	Radial Displacement Detector Device for a Magnetic Bearings
Croot, Estelle	1990	1,988,024,350	Further Improvements in Magnetic Bearings
Meeks, Crawford R	1992	5,111,102	Magnetic Bearing Structure
Croot, Estelle	1994	1,991,075,982	Non-linear Magnetic Bearing

Jesse Beams from the University of Virginia filed some of the earliest active magnetic bearing patents during World War II. The patents dealt with ultracentrifuges intended for the enrichment of isotopes of elements needed for the Manhattan Project. However, magnetic bearings did not mature until advances in solid-state electronics and modern computer-based control technology with the work of Habermann and Schweitzer. In 1987, Estelle Croot further improved active magnetic bearing technology, but these designs were not manufactured due to expensive costs of production, which used a laser guidance system. Estelle Croot's research was the subject of three Australian patents and was funded by Nachi Fujikoshi, Nippon Seiko KK and Hitachi, and her calculations were used in other technologies that used rare-earth magnets but the active magnetic bearings were only developed to the prototype stage. Croot's design also included an advance computerised control system, while the last design was a non-linear magnetic bearing.

Mary Kasarda reviews the history of active magnetic bearings in depth. She notes that the first commercial application of active magnetic bearings was in turbomachinery. The active magnetic bearing allowed the elimination of oil reservoirs on compressors for the NOVA Gas Transmission Ltd. (NGTL) gas pipelines in Alberta, Canada. This reduced the fire hazard allowing a substantial reduction in insurance costs. The success of these magnetic bearing installations led NGTL to pioneer the research and development of a digital magnetic bearing control system as a replacement for the analog control systems supplied by the American company Magnetic Bearings Inc. In 1992, NGTL's magnetic bearing research group formed the company Revolve Technologies Inc. for commercializing the digital magnetic bearing technology. The company was later purchased by SKF of Sweden. The French company S2M, founded in 1976, was the first to commercially market active magnetic bearings. Extensive research on magnetic bearings continues at the University of Virginia in the Rotating Machinery and Controls Industrial Research Program.

During the decade starting in 1996, the Dutch oil-and-gas company NAM installed twenty gas compressors, each driven by a 23-megawatt variable-speed-drive electric motor. Each unit was fully equipped with active magnetic bearings on both the motor and the compressor. These compressors are used in the Groningen gas field to extract the remaining gas from this large gas field and to increase the field capacity. The motor-compressor design was done by Siemens and the active magnetic bearings were delivered by Waukesha Bearings (owned by Dover Corporation). (Originally these bearings were designed by Glacier, this company was later taken over by Federal Mogul and is now part of Waukesha Bearings.) By using active magnetic bearings and a direct drive between motor and compressor (without having a gearbox in between) and by applying dry gas seals, a fully dry-dry (oil-free) system was achieved. Applying active magnetic bearings in both the driver and in the compressor (compared to the traditional configuration using gears and ball bearings) results in a relatively simple system with a very wide operating range and high efficiencies, particularly at partial load. As was done in the Groningen field, the full installation can additionally be placed outdoors without the need for a large compressor building.

Non-contacting permanent magnet bearings with electromotive stabilisation were applied for patent by R. G. Gilbert in 1955 (U. S. Patent 2,946,930) and K. Boden, D. Scheffer in 1968 (German Patent 1750602). These inventions provide the technological basis for a number of practical applications, some of which have reached the stage of industrial series production under licence from Forschungszentrum Jülich since about 1980.

Meeks pioneered hybrid magnetic bearing designs (US patent 5,111,102) in which permanent magnets provide the bias field and active control coils are used for stability and dynamic control. These designs using permanent magnets for bias fields are smaller and of lighter weight than purely electromagnetic bearings. The electronic control system is also smaller and requires less electrical power because the bias field is provided by the permanent magnets.

As the development of the necessary components progressed, scientific interest in the field also increased, peaking in the first International Symposium on Magnetic Bearings held in 1988 in Zürich with the founding of the International Society of Magnetic Bearings by Prof. Schweitzer (ETHZ), Prof. Allaire (University of Virginia), and Prof. Okada (Ibaraki University). Since then, the symposium has developed into a biennial conference series with a permanent portal on magnetic bearing technology where all symposium contributions are made available. The web portal is supported by the international research and industrial community. Joining the hall of fame and earning lifetime achievement awards in 2012 were Prof. Yohji Okada, Prof. Gerhard Schweitzer, and Michael Swann of Waukesha Magnetic Bearings.

== Applications ==
Magnetic bearing advantages include very low and predictable friction, and the ability to run without lubrication and in a vacuum. Magnetic bearings are increasingly used in industrial machines such as compressors, turbines, pumps, motors and generators.

Magnetic bearings are commonly used in watt-hour meters by electric utilities to measure home power consumption. They are also used in energy storage or transportation applications and to support equipment in a vacuum, for example in flywheel energy storage systems. A flywheel in a vacuum has very low wind resistance losses, but conventional bearings usually fail quickly in a vacuum due to poor lubrication. Magnetic bearings are also used to support maglev trains in order to get low noise and smooth ride by eliminating physical contact surfaces. Disadvantages include high cost, heavy weight and relatively large size.

Magnetic bearings are also used in some centrifugal compressors for chillers with a shaft made up of magnetic material lies between magnetic bearings. A small amount of current provides magnetic levitation to the shaft which remains freely suspended in air ensuring zero friction between the bearing and the shaft.

Among the most significant industrial applications are turbomolecular pumps for vacuum generation in semiconductor production plants. First commercial magnetic bearing type turbopumps without mechanical stabilisation were marketed by Leybold AG in 1975 (electromagnetic) and in 1989 (permanent magnet based).

In the field of vacuum metrology the spinning rotor gauge (SRG) was introduced as a reference standard by BIPM, Paris 1979. A first laboratory setup of this gauge was established by Jesse Beams in 1946. Commercial series production started in 1980 under licences from Forschungszentrum Jülich. The SRG is significant for vacuum process control in semiconductor manufacturing equipment.

A new application of magnetic bearings is in artificial hearts. The use of magnetic suspension in ventricular assist devices was pioneered by Prof. Paul Allaire and Prof. Houston Wood at the University of Virginia, culminating in the first magnetically suspended ventricular assist centrifugal pump (VAD) in 1999.

Several ventricular assist devices use magnetic bearings, including the LifeFlow heart pump, the DuraHeart Left Ventricular Assist System, the Levitronix CentriMag, and the Berlin Heart. In these devices, the single moving part is suspended by a combination of hydrodynamic force and magnetic force. By eliminating physical contact surfaces, magnetic bearings make it easier to reduce areas of high shear stress (which leads to red blood cell damage) and flow stagnation (which leads to clotting) in these blood pumps. Berlin Heart INCOR was the first commercial ventricular assist device without mechanical or fluid dynamic stabilisation.

Calnetix Technologies, Synchrony Magnetic Bearings (subsidiary of Johnson Controls International), Waukesha Magnetic Bearings, and S2M (subsidiary of SKF) are among the major magnetic bearing developers and manufacturers worldwide.

== Future advances ==
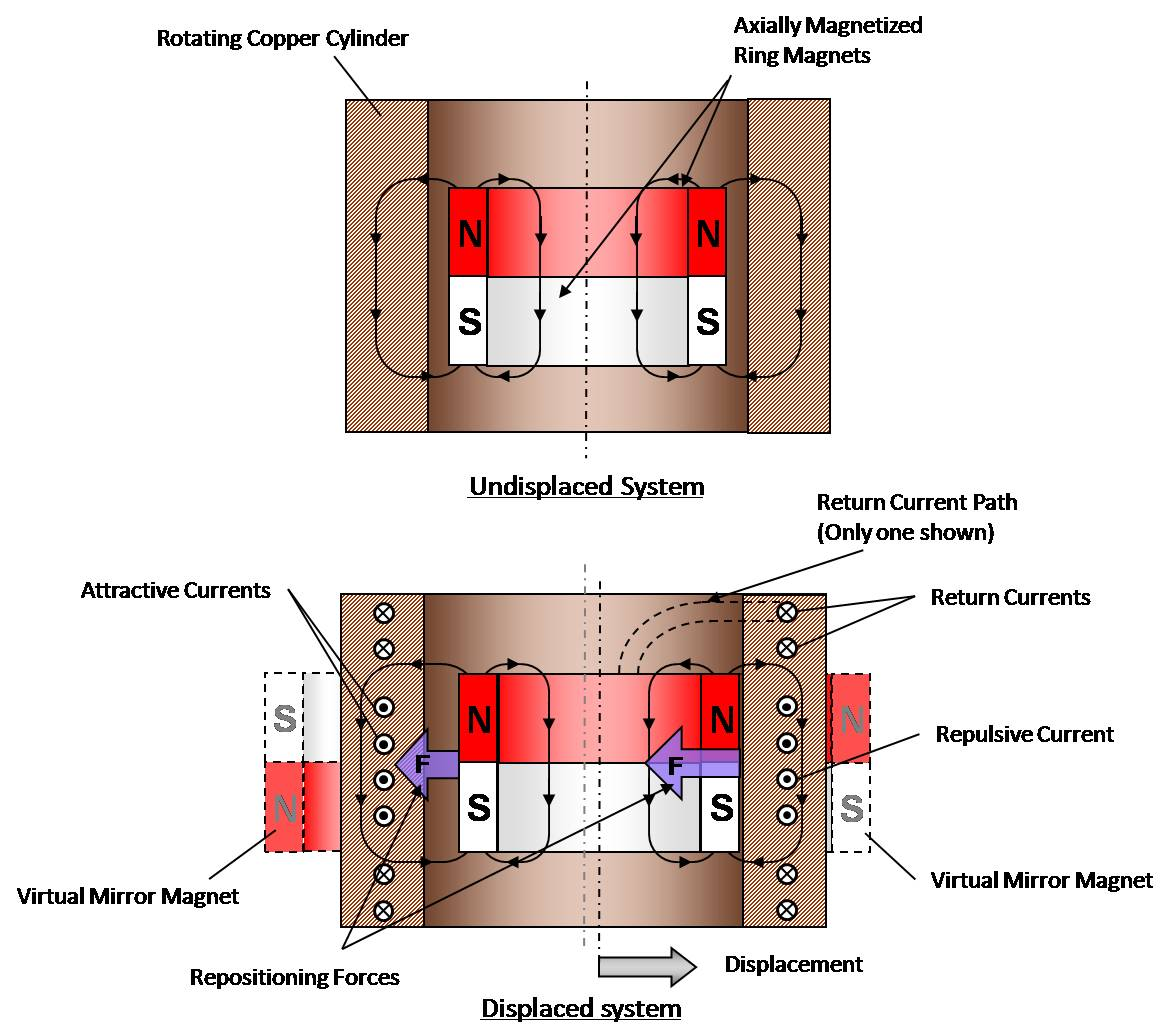
An axial homopolar electrodynamic bearing

With the use of an induction-based levitation system present in maglev technologies such as the Inductrack system, magnetic bearings could replace complex control systems by using Halbach arrays and simple closed loop coils. These systems gain in simplicity, but are less advantageous with regard to eddy current losses. For rotating systems it is possible to use homopolar magnet designs instead of multipole Halbach structures, which reduce losses considerably.

An example that has bypassed the Earnshaw's theorem issues is the homopolar electrodynamic bearing invented by Dr Torbjörn Lembke. This is a novel type of electromagnetic bearing based on a passive magnetic technology. It does not require any control electronics to operate and works because the electrical currents generated by motion cause a restoring force.

== See also ==
- Flywheel
- Levitron
- Spin-stabilized magnetic levitation
- Electrodynamic wheel
