= Earnshaw =

Earnshaw may refer to:

== People ==
- Adrian Earnshaw, Manx politician
- Anthony Earnshaw, English anarchist and writer
- Brian Earnshaw, Welsh writer
- Eleri Earnshaw, Welsh footballer
- Ernie Earnshaw, American musician
- George Earnshaw, American baseball player
- Harry Earnshaw (cyclist), English racing cyclist
- Isaac Earnshaw (1859–1914), Australian racehorse trainer
- John Earnshaw (1900–1982), Australian engineer, inventor and historian
- Laurence Earnshaw, English mechanician
- Manuel Earnshaw, Filipino businessman and politician
- Reginald Earnshaw, English soldier
- Robert Earnshaw, Welsh footballer
- Richard Earnshaw, English cricketer
- Russell Earnshaw, English rugby union player
- Samuel Earnshaw, English cleric
- Thomas Earnshaw, English watchmaker
- Tina Earnshaw, make-up artist
- William Earnshaw (politician), New Zealand member of parliament
- William Earnshaw (minister), American minister
- William C. Earnshaw, professor of chromosome dynamics
- Wilson Earnshaw, English cricketer

=== Fictional characters ===
- The main family in the 1847 novel Wuthering Heights, which includes:
  - Catherine Earnshaw, the female protagonist
  - Hareton Earnshaw, Catherine's nephew
  - Hindley Earnshaw, Catherine's brother and Hareton's father

== See also ==
- Earnshaw (disambiguation)
