= Earnshaw (disambiguation) =

Earnshaw may refer to:

- Earnshaw's theorem, a physics law stating that levitation with permanent magnets and other types of point charges is impossible
- Earnshaw, a surname
- Earnshaw paradox
- Earnshaw State College

== Places ==
- Earnshaw, West Virginia, USA
- Earnshaw State College, Queensland, Australia
- Earnshaw Glacier, Antarctica
