= Spin-stabilized magnetic levitation =

Type of magnetic levitation

A brief demonstration and small explanation featuring a Levitron branded levitating top device which works based upon the phenomenon of spin-stabilized magnetic levitation.

Spin-stabilized magnetic levitation is a phenomenon of magnetic levitation whereby a spinning magnet or array of magnets (typically as a top) is levitated via magnetic forces above another magnet or array of magnets, and stabilised by gyroscopic effect due to a spin rate that is neither too fast, nor too slow to allow for a necessary precession.

The phenomenon was originally discovered through invention by Vermont inventor Roy M. Harrigan in the 1970s. On May 3, 1983, Harrigan was granted a US patent for his original levitation device based upon this phenomenon he discovered. Independent of Harrigan, a Pennsylvanian inventor named Joseph Chieffo made the same discovery in 1984 employing a flat base magnet, a geometry that proved a significant change over his predecessor's patented design which relies upon a dish shaped mounting of magnets for the base. Chieffo's design, publicized in a 1991 edition of the periodical "Magnets In Your Future", further differed from Harrigan's in its incorporation of an un-weighted top. Harrigan's technology, either solely or in conjunction with Chieffo's published flat-base variation, provided the basis for the development of a series of mass marketed levitating toy tops sold predominantly in the United States under the brand name, 'Levitron' and in other countries from different manufacturers under their brand names (e.g. UCAS in Japan).

In 2012 and 2014 Max Michaelis reported operating Levitron brand magnetic tops at inclination angles of 45° and 90° (i.e. with the spin axis, horizontal) after employing novel configurations for the supporting magnetic fields.

== Physics ==
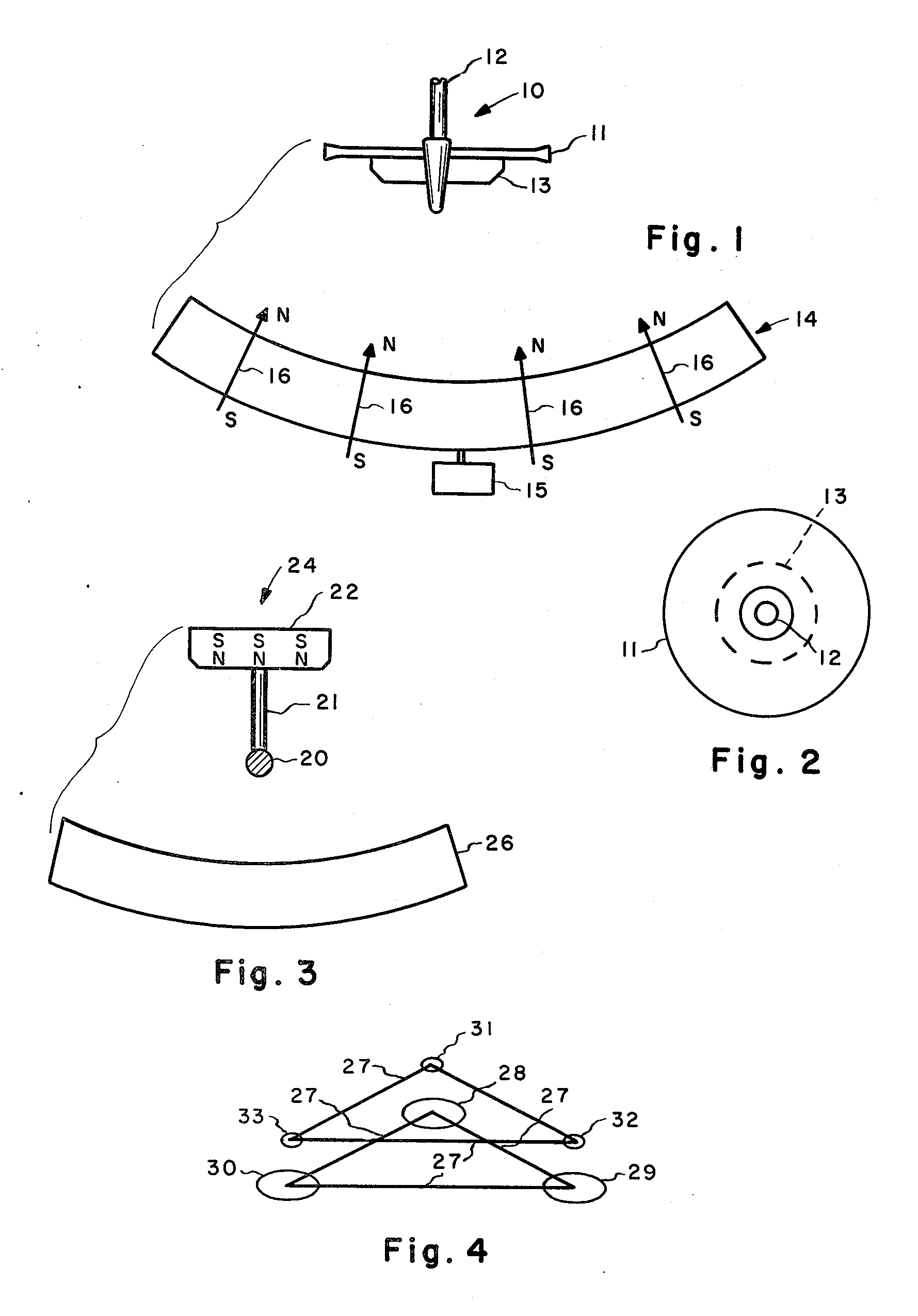
Drawings from US Patent 4382245

Earnshaw's theorem does not allow for a static configuration of permanent magnets to stably levitate another permanent magnet or materials that are paramagnetic or ferromagnetic against gravity. This theorem does not apply to devices consisting of a properly configured axially magnetized magnetic base and corresponding axially magnetized magnetic top, however, because the non-static nature of the spinning magnetic top within a threshold of lower and upper RPM spin rates acts as a balanced precessing gyroscope to prevent the poles of its magnetic field from fully aligning themselves in the same direction as those of the primary supporting toroidal field of the magnetic base (i.e.: via the top flipping). In a vertical orientated spin axis configuration this gyroscopic property with its necessary precession allows the top to keep its field in an oppositional orientation by responding dynamically to the field direction of the central magnetic field gradient of the toroidally shaped field of its base magnet(s) with the base gradient decreasing radially towards the central interior of the base field and thereby remain self-centered in a restorative manner, levitating about an elevated central point within the base magnetic field where the forces acting on the top (gravitational, magnetic, and gyroscopic) are in a stable equilibrium thus allowing the top to stay hovering while resting in an energy minimum well. (see: magnetic levitation)

In the laboratory, experimental setups are able to levitate tops for indefinite periods by measuring the spin rate and maintaining it using a drive coil. However, variations in temperature can affect the stability, and without ambient temperature control the top will eventually fall after hours or days due to the temperature coefficient of the magnets.

The physics of the magnetic stability is similar to magnetic gradient traps.

Inclined or horizontal spin axis levitation is accomplished by superposing a "macro-trap" on the precessional "micro-trap" first described by Sir Michael Berry and Simon, Heflinger and Ridgway. The macro-trap is generated by a combination of two magnetic "V"s as well as a puller magnet, situated directly above the Levitron. The puller acts like the string of a pendulum.

== See also ==
- Electromagnetic suspension
- Electrodynamic wheel
- Magnetic bearing
- Electrodynamic bearing
- Levitron
