= Kasarda =

Kasarda is a surname. Notable people with the surname include:

- John D. Kasarda, American academic and airport business consultant
- Mary Kasarda, American mechanical engineer
