= Braunbeck =

Braunbeck is a German surname. Notable people with the surname include:

- Gary A. Braunbeck (born 1960), American writer
- Werner Braunbeck (1901–1977), German physicist
