= Suspension (mechanics) =

In mechanics, suspension is a system of components allowing a machine (normally a vehicle) to move smoothly with reduced shock.

Types may include:

- car suspension, four-wheeled motor vehicle suspension
- motorcycle suspension, two-wheeled motor vehicle suspension
  - Motorcycle fork, a component of motorcycle suspension system
- bicycle suspension

Related concepts include:

- Shock absorber
- Shock mount
- Vibration isolation
- Magnetic suspension
  - Electrodynamic suspension
  - Electromagnetic suspension

== See also ==
- Cardan suspension
- Seismic base isolation
