= Electromagnetic suspension =

Suspension of objects through a feedback loop of magnetic field strength changes

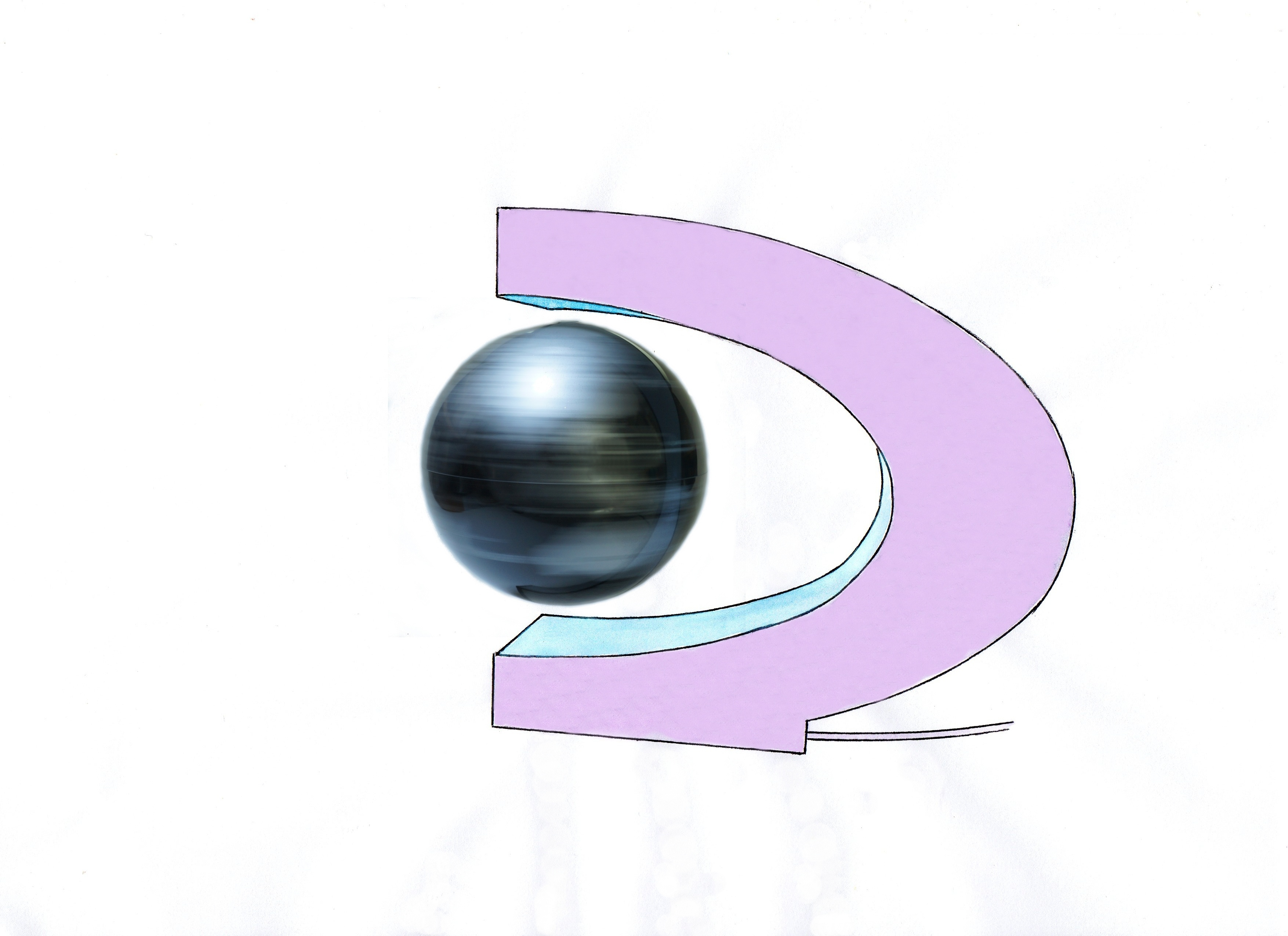
Floating globe. Magnetic levitation with a feedback loop.

Electromagnetic suspension (EMS) is the magnetic levitation of an object achieved by constantly altering the strength of a magnetic field produced by electromagnets using a feedback loop. In most cases the levitation effect is mostly due to permanent magnets as they have no power dissipation, with electromagnets only used to stabilise the effect.

According to Earnshaw's Theorem a paramagnetic body cannot rest in stable equilibrium when placed in any combination of gravitational and magnetostatic fields. In these kinds of fields, an unstable equilibrium condition exists. Although static fields cannot give stability, EMS works by continually altering the current sent to electromagnets to change the strength of the magnetic field and allows a stable levitation to occur. In EMS, a feedback loop which continuously adjusts one or more electromagnets to correct the object's motion is used to cancel the instability.

Many systems use magnetic attraction pulling upwards against gravity for these kinds of systems as this gives some inherent lateral stability, but some use a combination of magnetic attraction and magnetic repulsion to push upwards.

Magnetic levitation technology is important because it reduces energy consumption and largely reduces friction. It also avoids wear and has very low maintenance requirements. The application of magnetic levitation is most commonly known for its role in maglev trains.

== History ==
Samuel Earnshaw was the one to discover in 1839 that “a charged body placed in an electrostatic field cannot levitate at stable equilibrium under the influence of electric forces alone”. Likewise, due to limitations on permittivity, stable suspension or levitation cannot be achieved in a static magnetic field with a system of permanent magnets or fixed current electromagnets. Braunbek’s extension (1939) states that a system of permanent magnets must also contain diamagnetic material or a superconductor in order to obtain stable, static magnetic levitation or suspension.

Emile Bachelet applied Earnshaw's theorem and the Braunbek extension and stabilized magnetic force by controlling current intensity and turning on and off power to the electromagnets at desired frequencies. He was awarded a patent in March 1912 for his “levitating transmitting apparatus” (patent no. 1,020,942). His invention was first intended to be applied to smaller mail carrying systems but the potential application to larger train-like vehicles is certainly apparent.

In 1934 Hermann Kemper applied Bachelet’s concept to the large scale, calling it “monorail vehicle with no wheels attached.” He obtained Reich Patent number 643316 for his invention and is also considered by many to be the inventor of maglev.

In 1979 the Transrapid electromagnetically suspended train carried passengers for a few months as a demonstration on a 908 m track in Hamburg for the first International Transportation Exhibition (IVA 79).

The first commercial Maglev train for routine service was opened in Birmingham, England in 1984, using electromagnetic suspension, and a linear induction motor for propulsion.

== Background ==
=== Electromagnets ===
When a current passes through a wire, a magnetic field around that wire is generated. The strength of the generated magnetic field is proportional to the current through the wire. When a wire is coiled, this generated magnetic field is concentrated through the center of the coil. The strength of this field can be greatly increased by placing a ferromagnetic material in the center of the coil. This field is easily manipulated by passing a varying current in the wire. Therefore, a combination of permanent magnets with electromagnets is an optimal arrangement for levitation purposes. To reduce average power requirements, often the electromagnetic suspension is used only to stabilise the levitation, and the static lift against gravity is provided by a secondary permanent magnet system, often pulled towards a relatively inexpensive soft ferromagnetic material such as iron or steel.

=== Feedback ===
The position of the suspended object can be detected optically or magnetically, other schemes may sometimes be used.

The feedback circuit controls the electromagnet to try to keep the suspended object at the correct position.

However, simply controlling the position usually leads to instability, due to the small time delays in the inductance of the coil and in sensing the position. In practice then, the feedback circuitry must use the change of position over time to determine and damp the speed.

=== Hybrid Electromagnetic Suspension (H-EMS) ===
In the 21st century there has been several proposals to use hybrid electromagnetic suspension (also known as H-EMS) as an upgrade to the classical EMS configuration by adding permanent magnets to the electromagnets forming what it's called an array of electropermanent magnets. This configuration has proven to increase air gap and reduce energy consumption and is being used by both maglev and hyperloop experts.

== Applications ==
=== Maglev ===
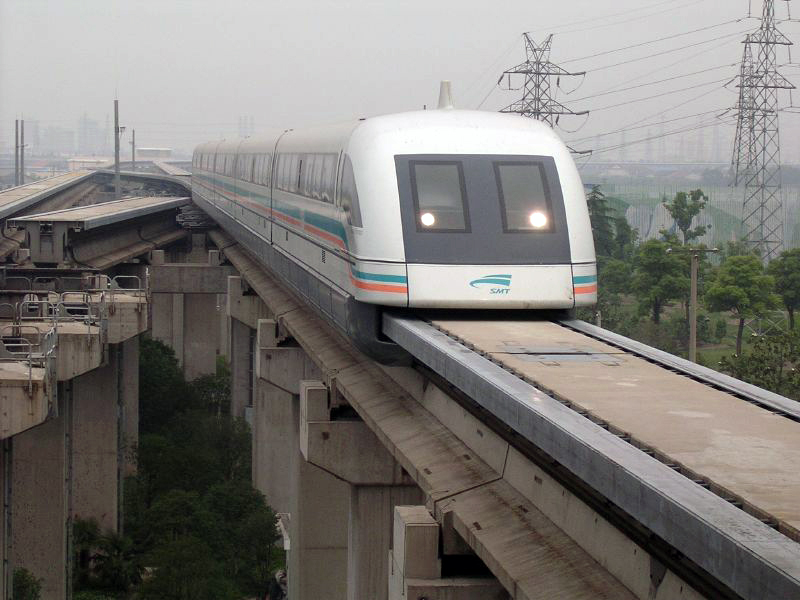
The Transrapid system uses servomechanisms to pull the train up from underneath the track and maintains a constant gap while traveling at high speed

Maglev (magnetic levitation) is a transportation system in which a vehicle is suspended on a guiding rail by the principle of electromagnetic suspension. Maglev has the advantages of being quieter and smoother than wheeled transportation due to eliminating much of the physical contact between wheels and track. Since a maglev requires a guiding rail, it is mostly used in railed transport systems like trains.

Since the first commercial maglev train was opened in Birmingham, England in 1984, other commercial EMS maglev train systems, such as the M-Bahn and the Transrapid have also been put into limited use. (Maglev trains based on electrodynamic suspension technology have also been developed and deployed.) With the possible exception of the 30.5 km Shanghai Maglev Train, no major long-distance EMS maglev routes have been built.

=== Active magnetic bearing ===
Basic operation for a single axis

An active magnetic bearing (AMB) works on the principle of electromagnetic suspension and consists of an electromagnet assembly, a set of power amplifiers which supply current to the electromagnets, a controller, and gap sensors with associated electronics to provide the feedback required to control the position of the rotor within the gap. These elements are shown in the diagram. The power amplifiers supply equal bias current to two pairs of electromagnets on opposite sides of a rotor. This constant tug-of-war is mediated by the controller which offsets the bias current by equal but opposite perturbations of current as the rotor deviates by a small amount from its center position.

The gap sensors are usually inductive in nature and sense in a differential mode. The power amplifiers in a modern commercial application are solid state devices which operate in a pulse-width modulation (PWM) configuration. The controller is usually a microprocessor or DSP.

=== Spaceship Launch Aid ===
NASA has been developing a launch aid using a magnetic levitation system to propel a spaceship. Proponents of maglev launch aid posit that it saves on design and launching costs, while providing a safer launching method.

== See also ==
- Maglev
- Magnetic levitation
- Electrodynamic suspension created by moving magnets or conductors
- ROMAG
- Krauss-Maffei Transurban
- Suspension (mechanics)
