= North American Maglev Transport Institute =

The North American Maglev Transport Institute (NAMTI) is a non-profit organization based in Washington, DC, USA, and established to educate the public about the advantages of magnetic levitation (maglev) transport. NAMTI also serves as a central clearing house for information on different types of maglev transport technology and to help clearly differentiate maglev technology from other modes, such as trains or USA trains.

NAMTI was created by several experts on maglev technology, including the last Chief Maglev Scientist for the U.S. government, Dr. John Harding. Dr. Harding retired from the U.S. Federal Railroad Administration in 2005 and his position was never refilled, thus leaving a gaping knowledge vacuum at the U.S. DOT of the major advances in overseas maglev technology. NAMTI was thus established as a new independent organization to stay abreast of evolving international maglev developments.

The institute maintains a website filled with data, charts, maps, photos and videos of several types of maglev technology being developed around the world. NAMTI resources are used by transportation planners, engineering firms, and governments around the world considering new maglev transport projects.

The NAMTI website was first captured as active in 2011. It was last captured as active in October 2015. The domain was posted as for sale in January 2016.
