= Levitron =

Brand of levitating toys

A brief demonstration and small explanation about the Levitron levitating top device

Levitron is a brand of levitating toys and gifts in science and educational markets marketed by Creative Gifts Inc. and Fascination Toys & Gifts. The Levitron top device is a design that served as a base for the manufacture of a series of commercial toys under this brand that employ the phenomenon known as spin-stabilized magnetic levitation. This design, with moving permanent magnets, is quite distinct from other versions which use changing electromagnetic fields, levitating various items such as a rotating world globe, model space shuttle or VW Beetle, and picture frame. 750,000 units of the top were sold from 1994 through 1999.

== The top device ==
The toy top is essentially a permanent magnetic ring and corresponding magnetic base plate with a ring or ring shaped magnetic configuration. Functional parameters, such as the top rotation rate or top weighting, are stringent. Employing principles of the magnetic field and gyroscopic stabilization, the Levitron top induces levitation through a series of interactive steps. The levitated top's stabilizing rotation undergoes natural, gradual slowing, so that the levitation phenomenon fails within four minutes unless external power is supplied to sustain rotation.

To levitate the top, a plastic plate is placed on top of the magnetic base, and the top is spun on the plate at 25–50 rotations per second (1500–3000 rpm). If too slow, the top falls over and slides off sideways; if too fast it does not orient itself to follow magnetic flux as it moves, and slides off. Since it can be difficult to spin the top fast enough by hand, Creative Gifts produced a battery-powered, hand held device to spin the top with an electric motor. Next, the plate is lifted by hand until, if conditions are right, the top rises above it to an equilibrium point. The top must also be weighted with washers of various sizes supplied in the kit. If too heavy it will not rise above the plate; if too light it flies off.

After a few minutes, the top falls when air friction slows it below the critical speed. Air temperature, air currents, and vibrations of the base, also alter the delicate equilibrium necessary to keep the top stable. More expensive laboratory versions can sustain a levitating top indefinitely by sustaining the top rotation, actively compensating for aberrations in rotation. The makers of the Levitron have developed a "Perpetuator", which sits under the Levitron and sends out an additional magnetic pulse. The additional force nudges the spinning top enough to maintain a constant speed. With a constant speed, and with the Levitron perfectly level, the Levitron top can spin for longer periods of time.

== Company history ==
=== Invention and patents ===
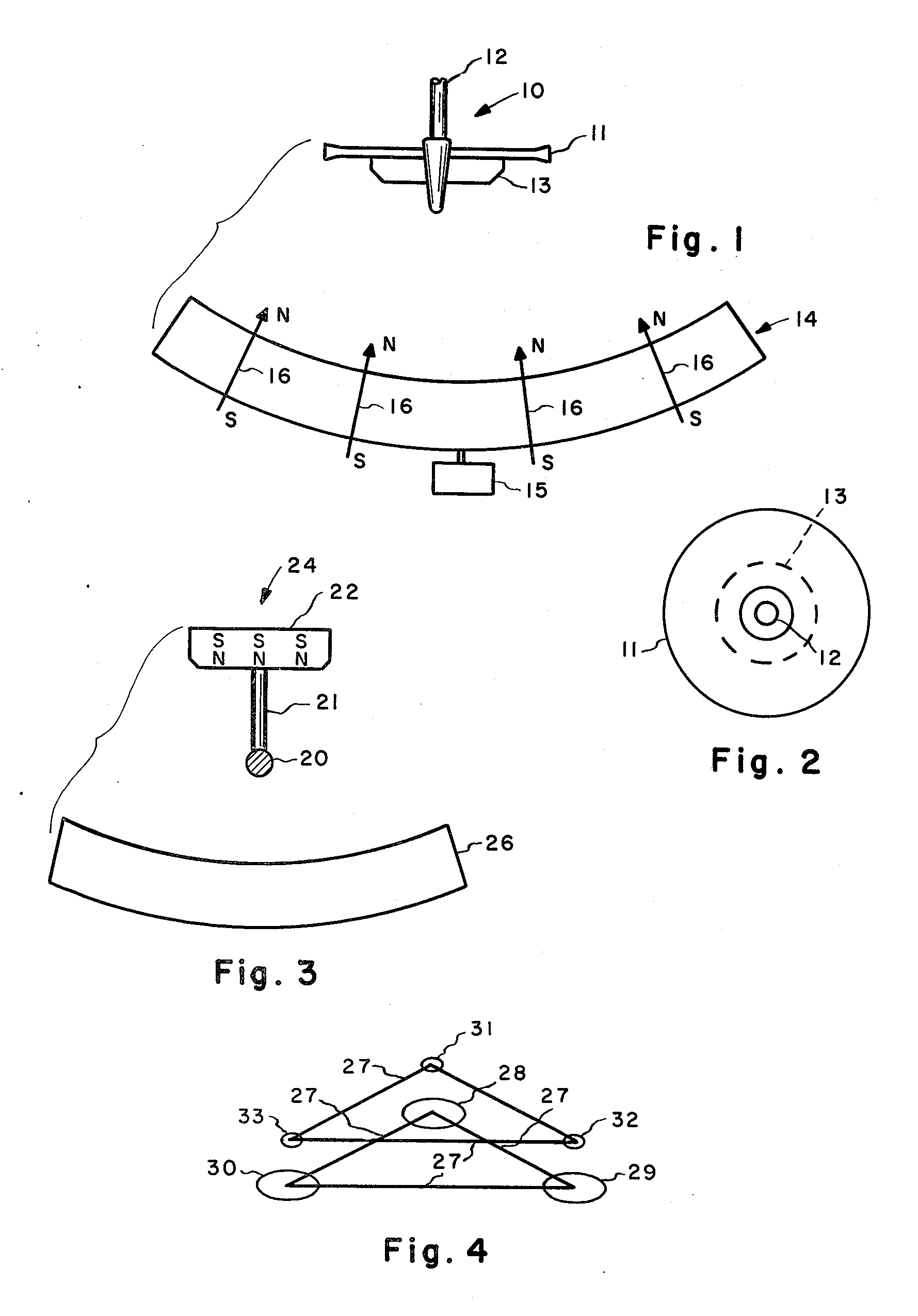
Drawings from US Patent 4382245

The first spin-stabilized permanent magnet levitation device was invented (c 1976) and patented (1983) by inventor Roy Harrigan, of Vermont. In the mid-1990s, Seattle entrepreneur Bill Hones, who was himself exploring the possibility of permanent magnet levitation, discovered Harrigan's patent. Hones subsequently contacted Harrigan and later met with him. Upon Hones' request, Harrigan permitted him to borrow his prototype with the understanding that they were entering into a business arrangement. Hones, with the help of his father, a Physicist and employee at Los Alamos National Laboratory, analyzed the physics of the prototype, and then filed for an "improvement patent". In 1984, independent of Roy Harrigan, inventor Joseph Chieffo, of Pennsylvania, also discovered spin-stabilized magnetic levitation. Chieffo then developed his own spin-stabilized magnetic levitation device and attempted to obtain a patent thereon. Employing an attorney to conduct a U.S. Patent and Trademark records search, Chieffo was informed of the existence of the Harrigan patent; he thus concluded his efforts to secure a patent. In a final assessment, Chieffo's attorney noted that his device, although apparently unpatentable, could be marketed without infringing upon the Harrigan patent. In 1988, Chieffo marketed his device in kit form. Contrasting with the dished supporting magnet of the Harrigan invention, the base magnet of this latter device was rectangular and planar of upper surface, not unlike the base magnet of Hones' later-patented device, the now-popular Physics toy known as the Levitron.

In 2012 and 2014, Levitrons were operated at an angle of 45° as well as with their spin axis horizontal. This inclined and horizontal operation was obtained with the help of additional magnetic "V"s. The horizontal Levitron is particularly stable, which gives it educational potential.

=== Trademark litigation ===
In the 1990s, the then husband and wife partners Michael and Karen Sherlock formed the company they named "UFO" in New Mexico to market the Levitron under an oral agreement in partnership with Hones' company, Creative Gifts, Inc. Efforts to formalize the agreement in writing fell apart and grew acrimonious after UFO's principals learned about the device's earlier invention by Harrigan, and redesigned their website to incorporate the exposé-style article "THE HIDDEN HISTORY OF THE LEVITRON!", which accused Hones of stealing the invention from Harrigan. Creative Gifts, in turn, filed a trademark infringement suit in United States District Court of New Mexico against UFO and its owners. At trial and on appeal to the Tenth Circuit Creative Gifts' trademark claims were upheld, and all of UFO's counterclaims were rejected after UFO, which had been representing itself as a pro se defendant, was sanctioned by the court for abuse of discovery. The appeals court, noting that UFO had submitted a one-page opening brief with no citations to the record or discussion of the relevant law, commented in its ruling, "they have shot themselves in the foot."

== See also ==
- Electromagnetic suspension
- Electrodynamic wheel
- Magnetic bearing
- Electrodynamic bearing
- Spin-stabilized magnetic levitation
