= Berlin Heart =

German health company

- Company type: Limited liability company
- Industry: Ventricular assist devices
- Founded: 2000
- Headquarters: Berlin, Germany

Berlin Heart GmbH is a German company that develops, produces and markets ventricular assist devices (VADs). The devices mechanically support the hearts of patients with end-stage heart failure. Berlin Heart's products include the implantable INCOR VAD and the paracorporeal EXCOR VAD. To date, Berlin Heart produces the only device of its kind available for babies and children with severe heart failure.

== History ==
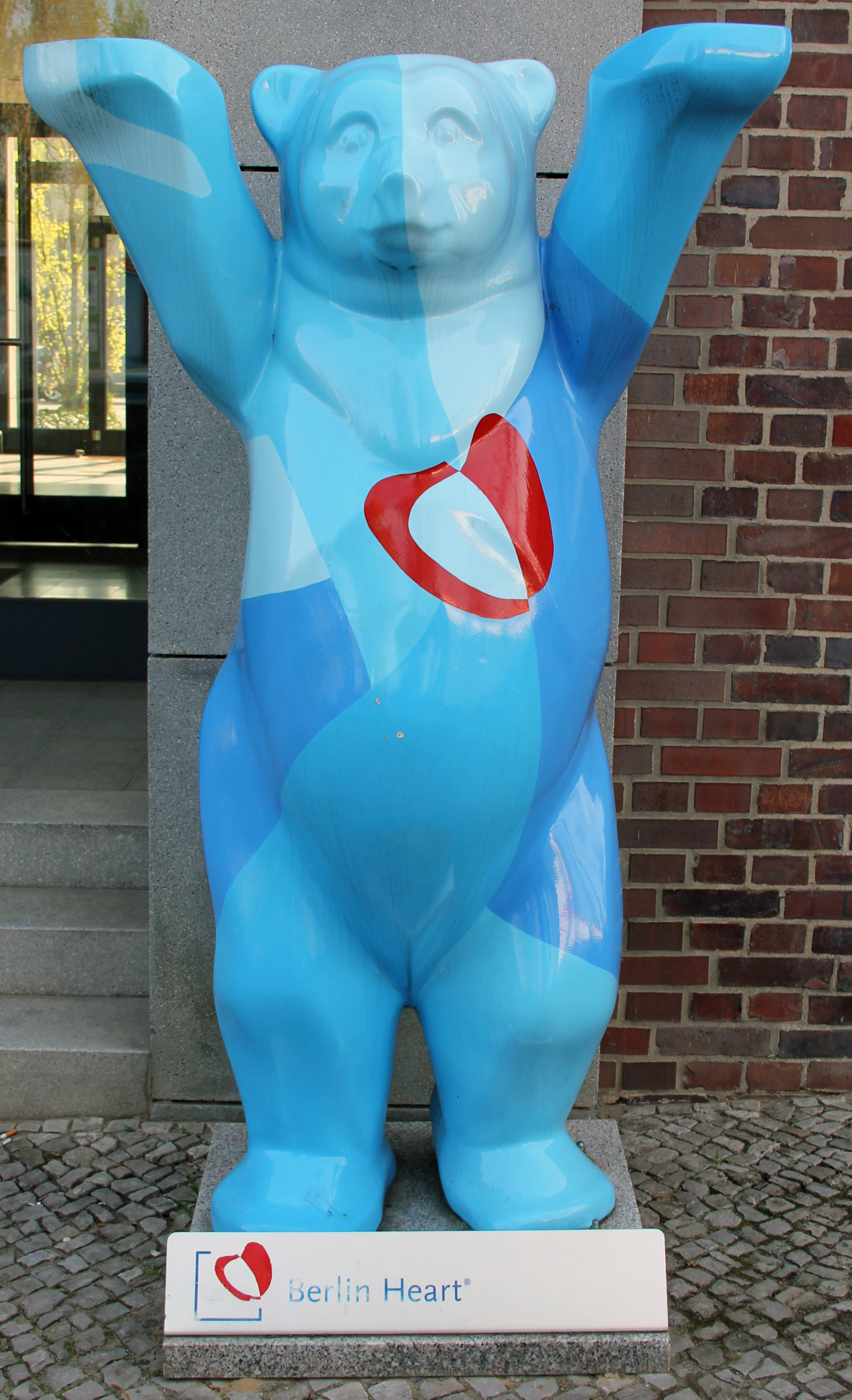
'Buddy Bear Berlin Heart' in front of the Head Office in Berlin

In 1987, the first EXCOR LVAD implantation was performed by Roland Hetzer at the German Heart Centre in Berlin. This pioneering procedure was followed in 1990 by the first paediatric EXCOR implantation at the same institution.

The company officially began operations as Mediport Kardiotechnik GmbH in 1996, established by the German Heart Institute Berlin and was supported by private investors. Four years later, in 2000, Mediport Kardiotechnik merged with its predecessor company, Mediport Kardiotechnik GmbH to form Berlin Heart AG.

The expansion continued with the establishment of a U.S. subsidiary, Berlin Heart Inc., in Texas in 2005.

A significant change occurred in 2006, when a private investor acquired Berlin Heart and changed its legal structure in 2006 to a limited liability company (GmbH). The EXCOR Pediatric device received full premarket approval (PMA) in the U.S. in 2017. Most recently, the EXCOR Active, a new mobile drive for the EXCOR ventricular assist device, was granted CE marking, affirming its compliance with European health, safety, and environmental standard.

== Products ==
Berlin Heart manufactures two types of VADs: implantable and paracorporeal.

INCOR is an axial-flow pump for support of the left ventricle. In this system, the pump is implanted directly next to the heart and is connected to the heart by cannula. The blood coming from the heart flows into the INCOR axial pump. The rotor in the pump has an active magnetic bearing while floating contact free. Due to the rotation, up to eight liters of blood per minute are continuously pumped through the body. A percutaneous driveline connects the pump with the external controller. The control unit and the two batteries are carried in a shoulder-bag.

EXCOR is a paracorporeal, pulsatile flow VAD. The device provides left ventricular, right ventricular or biventricular assistance. The EXCOR system includes paracorporeal, pneumatically-driven polyurethane blood pumps. Each pump consists of a blood chamber and an air chamber which are separated by a multilayer flexible membrane. The movement of air in and out of the air chamber is controlled by a driving unit. It moves the membranes, which draw blood into the blood chamber and push it back into the body. Like the heart, EXCOR blood pumps have valves which ensure that the blood only flows in one direction. The blood pumps are connected to the heart and blood vessels via silicone cannula.

The EXCOR product range covers blood pumps and cannula of various sizes and types. While EXCOR Adult is specifically designed for adults, EXCOR Pediatric includes devices for young patients (from newborns to adolescents).

== Trivia ==
In 2018 Chloe Caldwell became the first pediatric patient to be flown for a medical treatment from the United States to Germany. Caldwell had been implanted a VAD manufactured by Berlin Heart after severe heart problems. A team of doctors at the Berlin's Deutsches Herzzentrum Berlin (DHZB) removed the VAD successfully and she is expected to make a full recovery, without the need of a heart transplant.

== Milestones ==
- In 1996, the EXCOR Stationary Driving Unit Ikus received CE approval.
- In 1999, the EXCOR mobile driving unit received CE approval.
- In 2000, the first child in the USA is supported by EXCOR Pediatric.
- In 2003, INCOR received CE approval after successfully completing the Multi-Center Study.
- In 2008, the INCOR patient Jean-Pierre Offe celebrated his five-year anniversary while on the system and therefore setting an INCOR world record. EXCOR Pediatric received unrestricted IDE Approval in the USA.
- In 2009, the 500th patient received INCOR VAD at the German Heart Institute.
- In 2011, EXCOR Pediatric received FDA approval for the U.S. market. The number of children who had been on EXCOR Pediatric reached over 1,000.
- In 2012, the longest support time of a toddler on EXCOR Pediatric reached 2.5 years.
- In 2013, the EXCOR Pediatric 15 ml blood pump received CE approval.
- In 2014, the 1,500th pediatric patient was supported by EXCOR Pediatric.
- In 2017, Excor Pediatric receives full market approval (Premarket Approval, PMA) on the US market.
- In 2019, The new mobile drive for the heart support system Excor, the Excor Active, receives the CE marking.

== Locations ==
Berlin Heart's headquarters is in Berlin, Germany, where all products and equipment are also manufactured. The wholly owned Berlin Heart, Inc. in the Woodlands, Texas, provides support for implanting centers in the United States and Canada.
