= Émile Bachelet =

French-American inventor (1863–1946)

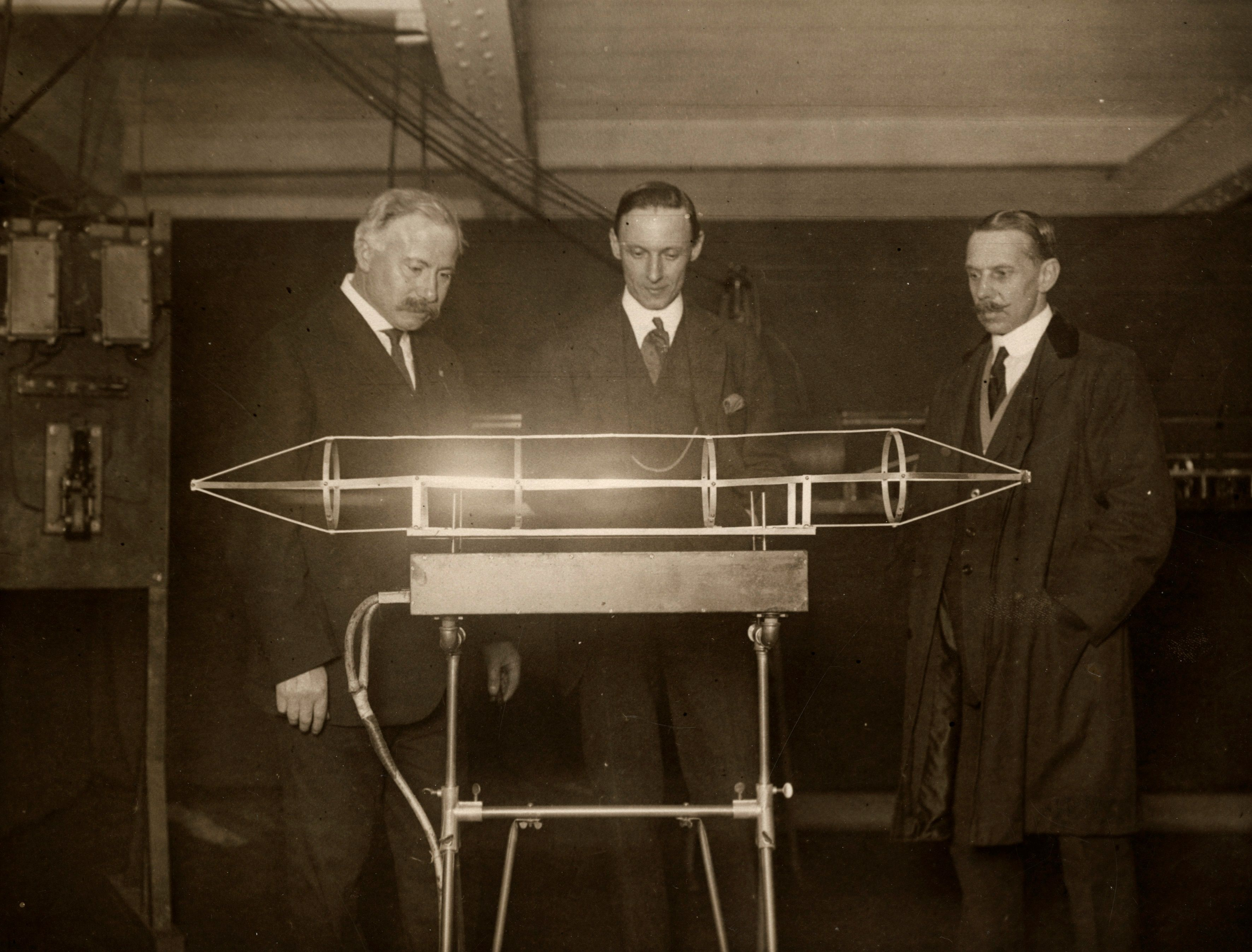
- Bachelet (left) with a model, 1914
- Born: 30 January 1863; Nanterre, France
- Died: 2 May 1946 (aged 83); Poughkeepsie, New York, U.S.
- Citizenship: United States (after 1889)
- Occupation: Inventor

Émile Bachelet (30 January 1863 – 2 May 1946) was a French-American inventor. In the 1880s, he worked in the United States as an electrician. After discovering therapeutic qualities of magnetic fields especially with arthritis patients, he began to commercialize this practice. While doing so Bachelet began to experiment with magnetic fields.

== Early life ==
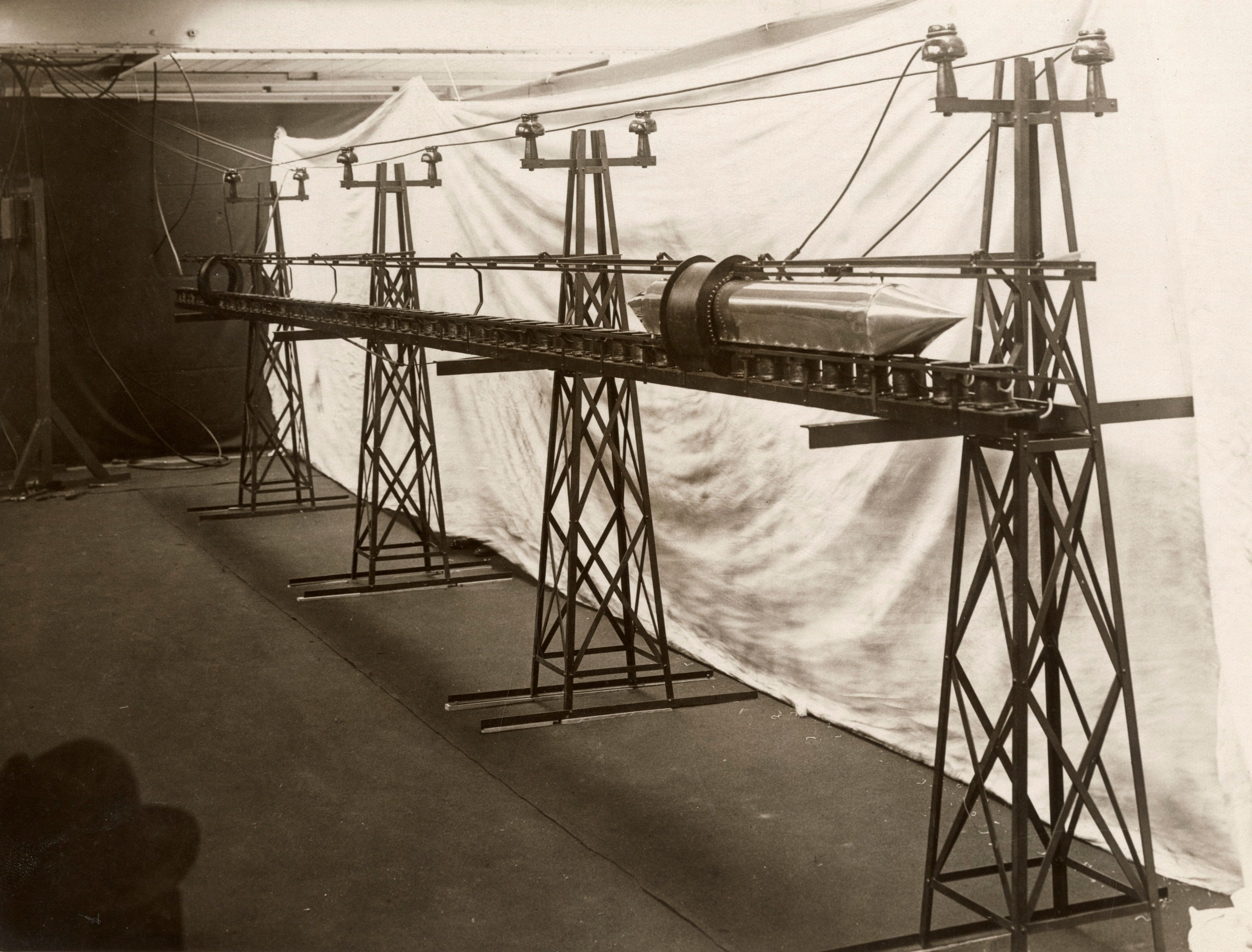
Model of the magnetic levitation train (1914)

Bachelet was born on 30 January 1863 in Nanterre, to Henri Bachelet. He immigrated to the United States in 1883 and became an American citizen in 1889.

== Career ==
Bachelet was granted U.S. patent 1,020,942 in 1912 for his "Levitating Transmitting Apparatus." which was meant to transfer mail and small packages on a cart which was levitated above a track of electromagnets. The patent also talked of a large version transporting freight or passengers. In 1912 Bachelet demonstrated a model to the press in Mount Vernon, New York.

A vaudeville show called The Bachelet Mystery opened in London and New York in early 1913 demonstrating the wonders of electromagnetism using equipment supplied by Bachelet.

In 1914 he presented his model to the Admiralty in London, England where a one-meter-long aluminum mobile agent hovered in a state of levitation, one centimeter above an 11-meter-long guide (which was the first example of a magnetic levitation train). The press used the words "flying train".

Winston Churchill who assisted the demonstration said it was the most wonderful thing he had ever seen in his life.

The Bachelet Levitated Railway Syndicate Limited was registered 1914 Jul 9 in London, just weeks before the start of WWI.

== Death ==
He died on 2 May 1946 in Poughkeepsie, New York.
