= Werner Braunbek =

German physicist (1901–1977)

Werner Braunbek (German: Werner Braunbek; 8 January 1901 – 9 February 1977) was a German physicist.

He was born in Bautzen, the son of the Government Commissioner of City Planning Otto August Braunbek (1869–1929). Werner attended the University of Stuttgart, the Ludwig-Maximilians-Universität München and the Friedrich Wilhelm University of Berlin. In 1925, he received a doctorate in engineering and completed his habilitation in theoretical physics the following year at the University of Stuttgart, where he continued as a lecturer.

In 1932, Braunbek became Associate Professor at the University of Stuttgart, before replacing Alfred Landé in 1936 as Professor of theoretical physics at the University of Tübingen, and succeeding to the role of Professor in 1959. In 1961 and 1962, he served as Dean of Mathematical and Natural Sciences of the University of Tübingen.

In 1934, Braunbek developed the Braunbek coil, a modified Helmholtz coil. In 1939, he disproved Earnshaw's theorem by showing that there are magnetic fields in which small diamagnetic bodies can float in a stable position. He pioneered study into the diffraction of waves, particularly at short wavelengths. Braunbek also authored a number of popular science physics books.

He died in Tübingen, aged 76.

== Publications ==
- The radio receiver: a generally comprehensible presentation (1929)
- The importance of Piccardschen height flight (1931)
- The electrical conductivity of compressed metal vapors (1935)
- The generation of largely homogeneous magnetic fields by circulating currents
- Basic concepts of nuclear physics (1958)
- When even atoms freeze: The physics of low temperatures (1970)
- Nuclear power in the present and future (1953)
- Core Physical Measurement Methods (1960)
- Way to the Boundless: concerning the origins of our physical knowledge (1961)
- Hazardous radiation: concerning atomic and nuclear radiation (1957)
- Introduction to the physics and technology of semiconductors (1970)
- Rays, waves, quanta: lecture held at the official enrollment at the University of Tübingen on 24 Nov. 1966 (1967)
- On the neutrino beam: a modern radiation physics for all (1968)
- Particular radiation in research and practice
- Methods and results of nuclear research (1948)
- The uncanny growth formula (1973) ISBN 978-3-471-66539-8
- Researchers Shake the World: The drama of the atomic nucleus (1956)
- The Drama Of The Atom (1958)
- with Karl Röttel: Researchers at the roots of being (1981)
- New Physics - revolutionizing the physical world picture (1975) ISBN 3-499-16898-7.
- The physics in the world of tomorrow (1975) ISBN 3-430-11517-5.

== See also ==
- Braunbek extension
