= Earnshaw paradox =

Paradox in wave propagation

In fluid dynamics, the Earnshaw paradox is a physical paradox related to considering sound waves in an ideal inviscid fluid. According to common sense, sound waves can travel long distances in air with little to no attenuation. In contrast, it can be shown that waves with permanent shape cannot arise in a gas where sound waves vibrate adiabatically. The paradox arises because too many approximations are imposed to the problem.

This paradox is named after Samuel Earnshaw, who described it in 1860. This was a key issue for the development of the theory of shock waves.

== History ==
In 1848, George Stokes and James Challis observed problems with wave theory for large disturbances.

Clergyman and naturalist Samuel Earnshaw discussed in 1860 the possibility that sound travels at different speeds depending on the intensity, he concludes "If the theory here advanced be true, the report of fire-arms should travel faster than the human voice, and the crash of thunder faster than the report of a cannon." He also noticed during a strong lightning strike a shorter delay between the flash and the sound. To support his theory he published another paper with his paradox showing that sound cannot travel in an ideal way.

George Stokes secretary of the Royal Society asked Lord Kelvin to review the paper on the paradox. Kelvin was initially against its publication.

== Description ==
In an inviscid fluid where a train of plane waves moves with constant amplitude, frequency and speed (velocity normal to the wavefronts), an observer moving at the same speed sees a time-independent motion. Choosing x as the direction of propagation in 1D, the density $\rho(x)$ and the flow velocity $u(x)$, Bernoulli's principle (neglecting gravity) implies
$$u\mathrm d u+\frac{\mathrm d p}{\rho}=0,$$
where $p(x)$ is the fluid pressure. Also the continuity equation reduces to $\rho u=C=\text{constant}$. This allows to derive an equation of state given by

$$\mathrm d p=C^2\frac{\mathrm d \rho}{\rho^2}.$$
Hence waves are only possible if the fluid has the following equation of state
$$p=p_0-\frac{C^2}{\rho},$$
where $p_0$ is a constant.

There is no known gas that follows this adiabatic equation of state. The reason is that
$$\frac{\mathrm d p^2}{\mathrm d \rho^2}<0,$$
which violates the second law of thermodynamics.

== Resolution ==
The problem with Earnshaw paradox is that it assumes that waves travel adiabatically, without dissipation. The paradox implies that a finite-amplitude wave cannot keep a fixed shape and non-linear effects must be introduced. Higher-pressure regions travel faster than lower pressure regions, causing the waves to steepen and form shock waves.

W. J. M. Rankine (1870) and subsequently by Pierre Henri Hugoniot (1887, 1889) developed a more realistic thermodynamic model given by Rankine–Hugoniot conditions, showing that the flow was non-isentropic.
