= Wilson Earnshaw =

English county cricketer

Wilson Earnshaw (20 September 1867 – 24 November 1941) was an English first-class cricketer, who played six matches for Yorkshire County Cricket Club between 1893 and 1896.

Born in Morley, Yorkshire, England, Earnshaw was a wicket-keeper who took six catches and completed two stumpings and scored 44 runs, with a top score of 23, at an average of 11. He played for Yorkshire in a non first-class game in 1890, and for their Second XI in 1897.

Earnshaw died in November 1941 in Low Town, Pudsey, Yorkshire.
