= Hermann Kemper =

German engineer, pioneer in magnetic levitation

- Born: 5 April 1892
- Died: 13 July 1977 (aged 85)
- Occupation: Engineer

Hermann Kemper (5 April 1892 in Nortrup – 13 July 1977) was a German engineer and pioneer in magnetic levitation sometimes known as the father of maglev.

Hermann Kemper began his research on magnetic levitation in 1922. In 1933, Kemper constructed a working circuit for hovering on the principle of electromagnetic levitation, using electromagnetic attraction. He was awarded the Reichs Patent number 643316, "Schwebebahn mit räderlosen Fahrzeugen, die an eisernen Fahrschienen mittels magnetischer Felder schwebend entlang geführt wird" (the invention of a hovertrack with wheelless vehicles which hover along iron rails using magnetic fields). This invention eventually led to the development of Transrapid.

In 1972, he received recognition for his research achievements, the Great Cross of Merit of the Federal Republic of Germany.
