= Electrodynamic wheel =

Proposed electrodynamic levitation system

An electrodynamic wheel is a type of wheel proposed for use in electrodynamic levitation of the maglev train transport system.

Unlike a conventional wheel, an electrodynamic wheel has a rim studded with magnets of alternating poles. As the wheel spins, which is done at a rate so that there is slip between the rim and the guideway's surface, magnetic fields are induced in the conductive guideway, which repels the wheel.

Depending on the spin, electrodynamic wheels can provide propulsion, braking, control, and lift.

== Using 2D model ==
The mechanical rotation of a radially positioned permanent-magnet Halbach array above a conducting, nonmagnetic track induces eddy currents in the track that can inductively create suspension and propulsion forces simultaneously. The parameters that affect the performance of this electrodynamic wheel are studied using a 2-D steady-state finite-element method.

== Examples ==
The Hendo hoverboard uses electrodynamic wheels to levitate itself over a conductive surface.

== See also ==
- Halbach array
- Spin-stabilized magnetic levitation
