= Mary Kasarda =

American mechanical engineer

Mary E. F. Kasarda is a retired American mechanical engineer whose research focused on the vibration, wear, and diagnostics of rotating machinery. She is an associate professor emeritus of mechanical engineering at Virginia Tech, and president of ABET Bridge, a nonprofit organization that supports ABET in its mission of engineering accreditation.

== Education and career ==
Kasarda writes that she grew up in love with cars, with her earliest memory being the sight of a Ford Mustang at the 1964 New York World's Fair. She became a student at the University of Virginia, where she received her bachelor's degree and master's degree, and then worked in industry for five years before returning to the university for a Ph.D. Her 1997 doctoral dissertation, Measurement and Characterization of Power Losses in High Speed Magnetic Bearings, was supervised by Paul E. Allaire.

She joined the Virginia Tech faculty in 1997, and retired in 2024.

== Recognition ==
Kasarda was named as an ASME Fellow in 2011.
