= Samuel Earnshaw =

- Born: 1 February 1805; Sheffield, Yorkshire, England
- Died: 6 December 1888 (aged 83); Sheffield, Yorkshire, England
- Known for: Earnshaw's theorem Earnshaw paradox

Samuel Earnshaw (1 February 1805, Sheffield, Yorkshire – 6 December 1888, Sheffield, Yorkshire) was an English clergyman and mathematician and physicist, noted for his contributions to theoretical physics, especially for proving Earnshaw's theorem.

Earnshaw was born in Sheffield and entered St John's College, Cambridge, graduating Senior Wrangler and Smith's Prizeman in 1831.

From 1831 to 1847 Earnshaw worked in Cambridge as tripos coach, and in 1846 was appointed to the parish church St. Michael, Cambridge. For a time he acted as curate to the Revd Charles Simeon. In 1847 his health broke down and he returned to Sheffield working as a chaplain and teacher. As a clergyman, he published several sermons and treatises.

== Research ==
Earnshaw published several mathematical and physical articles and books. His most famous contribution, Earnshaw's theorem, shows the impossibility of stability of matter under purely electrostatic forces.

Earnshaw was important in the early development of the theory of shock waves. The Earnshaw paradox, which shows it is impossible for an ideal to carry waves, is named after him.

Other topics included optics, calculus, trigonometry and partial differential equations in mathematics.

== See also ==
- Cotes's spiral
