= Maglev =

Train system using magnetic levitation

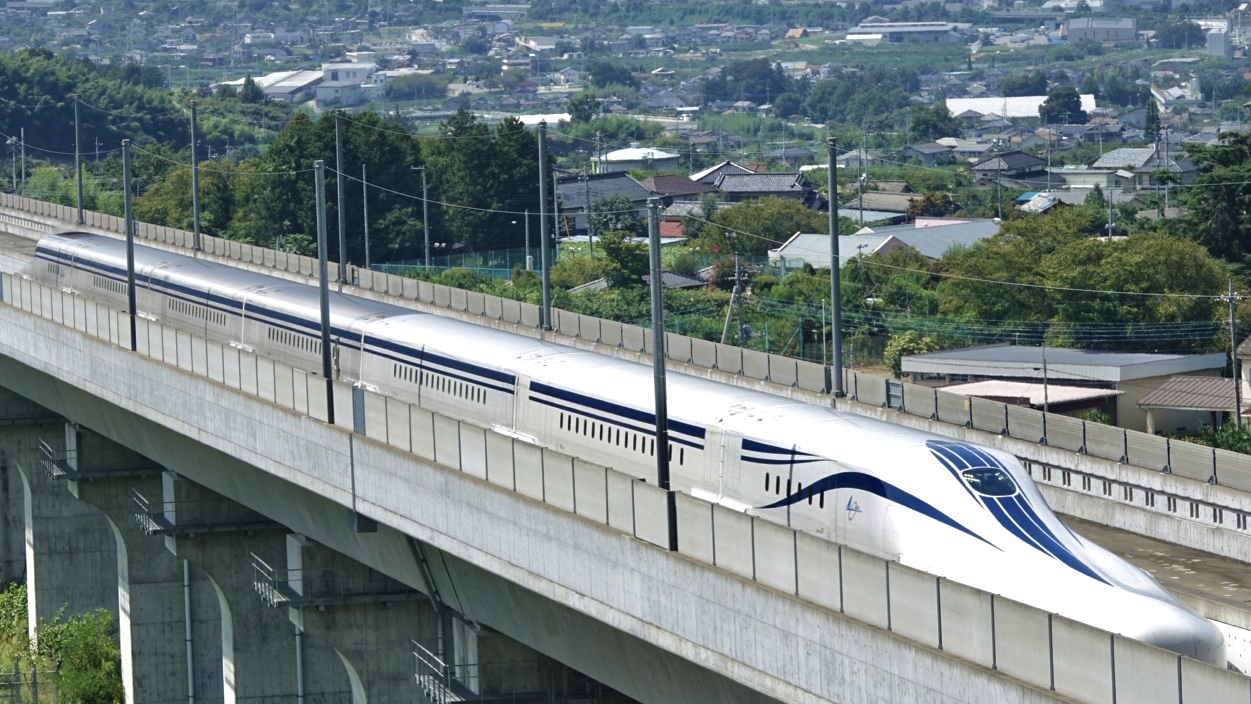
L0 Series train on the under-construction Chūō Shinkansen, Yamanashi Prefecture, Japan

A full trip on the Shanghai Transrapid maglev train

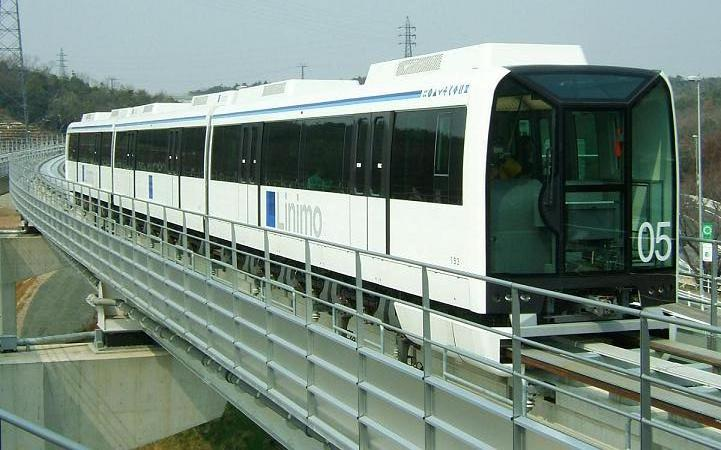
Example of low-speed urban maglev system, Linimo

Maglev (derived from magnetic levitation) is a system of rail transport whose rolling stock is levitated by magnets rather than rolled on wheels.

Compared to conventional railways, maglev trains can have higher top speeds, superior acceleration and deceleration, lower maintenance costs, improved gradient handling, and lower noise. However, they are more expensive to build, cannot use existing infrastructure, and use more energy at high speeds.

Maglev trains have set several speed records. The train speed record of 603 km/h (375 mph) was set by the experimental Japanese L0 Series maglev in 2015. From 2002 until 2021, the record for the highest operational speed of a passenger train of 431 kilometres per hour (268 mph) was held by the Shanghai maglev train, which uses German Transrapid technology. The service connects Shanghai Pudong International Airport and the outskirts of central Pudong, Shanghai. At its historical top speed, it covered the distance of 30.5 kilometres (19 mi) in just 7 minutes and 20 seconds.

Different maglev systems achieve levitation in different ways, which broadly fall into two categories: electromagnetic suspension (EMS) and electrodynamic suspension (EDS). Propulsion is typically provided by a linear motor. The power needed for levitation is typically not a large percentage of the overall energy consumption of a high-speed maglev system. Instead, overcoming drag takes the most energy. Vactrain technology has been proposed as a means to overcome this limitation.

Despite over a century of research and development, there are only six operational maglev trains today – four in China, one in Japan, and one in South Korea.

Two inter-city maglev lines are currently under construction, the Chūō Shinkansen connecting Tokyo and Nagoya (with further connection to Osaka) and a line between Changsha and Liuyang in Hunan Province, China.

== History ==
=== Development ===
In the late 1940s, the British electrical engineer Eric Laithwaite, a professor at Manchester University, developed the first full-size working model of the linear induction motor. He became a professor of heavy electrical engineering at Imperial College London in 1964, where he continued his successful development of the linear motor. Since linear motors do not require physical contact between the vehicle and guideway, they became a common fixture on advanced transportation systems in the 1960s and 1970s. Laithwaite joined one such project, the Tracked Hovercraft RTV-31, based near Cambridge, UK, although the project was canceled in 1973.

The linear motor was naturally suited to use with maglev systems as well. In the early 1970s, Laithwaite discovered a new arrangement of magnets, the magnetic river, that allowed a single linear motor to produce both lift and forward thrust, allowing a maglev system to be built with a single set of magnets. Working at the British Rail Research Division in Derby, along with teams at several civil engineering firms, the "transverse-flux" system was developed into a working system.

The first commercial maglev people mover was simply called "MAGLEV" and officially opened in 1984 near Birmingham, England. It operated on an elevated 600 metres (2,000 ft) section of monorail track between Birmingham Airport and Birmingham International railway station, running at speeds up to 42 kilometres per hour (26 mph). The system was closed in 1995 due to reliability problems.

=== First maglev patent ===
High-speed transportation patents were granted to various inventors throughout the world. The first relevant patent, U.S. patent 714,851 (2 December 1902), issued to Albert C. Albertson, used magnetic levitation to take part of the weight off of the wheels while using conventional propulsion.

Early United States patents for a linear motor propelled train were awarded to German inventor Alfred Zehden. The inventor was awarded U.S. patent 782,312 (14 February 1905) and U.S. patent RE12700 (21 August 1907). (Note: Zehden describes a geometry in which the linear motor is used below a steel beam, giving partial levitation of the vehicle. These patents were later cited by Electromagnetic apparatus generating a gliding magnetic field by Jean Candelas (U.S. patent 4,131,813), Air cushion supported, omnidirectionally steerable, traveling magnetic field propulsion device by Harry A. Mackie (U.S. patent 3,357,511) and Two-sided linear induction motor especially for suspended vehicles by Schwarzer et al. (U.S. patent 3,820,472)) In 1907, another early electromagnetic transportation system was developed by F. S. Smith. In 1908, Cleveland mayor Tom L. Johnson filed a patent for a wheel-less "high-speed railway" levitated by an induced magnetic field. Jokingly known as "Greased Lightning," the suspended car operated on a 90-foot test track in Johnson's basement "absolutely noiseless[ly] and without the least vibration." A series of German patents for magnetic levitation trains propelled by linear motors were awarded to Hermann Kemper between 1937 and 1941. (Note: These German patents would be GR643316 (1937), GR44302 (1938), GR707032 (1941).) An early maglev train was described in U.S. patent 3,158,765, "Magnetic system of transportation", by G. R. Polgreen on 25 August 1959. The first use of "maglev" in a United States patent was in "Magnetic levitation guidance system" by Canadian Patents and Development Limited.

=== New York, United States, 1912 ===
In 1912, French-American inventor Émile Bachelet demonstrated a model train with electromagnetic levitation and propulsion in Mount Vernon, New York. Bachelet's first related patent, U.S. patent 1,020,942 was granted in 1912. The electromagnetic propulsion was by attraction of iron in the train by direct current solenoids spaced along the track. The electromagnetic levitation was due to the repulsion between the train's aluminum base plate and the pulsating-current electromagnets beneath the track. The pulses were generated by Bachelet's own Synchronizing-interrupter U.S. patent 986,039 supplied with 220 VAC. As the train moved, it switched power to the section of track that it was on. Bachelet went on to demonstrate his model in London, England in 1914, which resulted in the registration of Bachelet Levitated Railway Syndicate Limited 9 July in London, just weeks before the start of WWI.

Bachelet's second related patent, U.S. patent 1,020,943, granted the same day as the first, featured levitation electromagnets in the train, with the track as an aluminum plate. In the patent, he stated that this was a much cheaper construction, but he did not demonstrate it.

=== Japan, 1962–present ===
Japan has two technologically distinct maglev systems developed independently: one is the superconducting maglev (SCMaglev), whose development began in the 1960s, and the other is HSST, whose development began in the 1970s. The former is being constructed as the Chūō Shinkansen, a line linking Tokyo (Shinagawa Station) and Nagoya over a distance of 285.6 kilometres (177.5 mi), while the latter entered operation in 2005 as the Linimo, operating over an 8.9 kilometres (5.5 mi) route in Aichi Prefecture.

The development of the former started in 1962. The first successful SCMaglev run was conducted on a short track at the Japanese National Railways (JNR) Railway Technical Research Institute in 1972. Maglev trains on the Miyazaki test track (a later, 7 km long test track) regularly hit 517 kilometres per hour (321 mph) by 1979. After an accident destroyed the train, a new design was selected. In Okazaki, Japan (1987), the SCMaglev was used for test rides at the Okazaki exhibition. Tests in Miyazaki continued throughout the 1980s, before transferring to a far longer test track, 20 kilometres (12 mi) long, in Yamanashi in 1997. The track has since been extended to almost 43 kilometres (27 mi). The 603 kilometres per hour (375 mph) world speed record for crewed trains was set there in 2015.

Construction of the Chūō Shinkansen, which employs SCMaglev technology, began in 2014. Initially, the section between Tokyo (Shinagawa Station) and Nagoya was scheduled to open in 2027, with the extension to Osaka planned for the 2030s. However, due to construction delays and opposition from Heita Kawakatsu, the governor of Shizuoka Prefecture, through which the line passes, the opening of the Tokyo–Nagoya section is, as of 2026, expected no earlier than 2036.

Development of HSST started in 1974. In 1978, it successfully achieved unmanned operation at a speed of 308 km/h. In Tsukuba, Japan (1985), the HSST-03 became popular at the Tsukuba World Exposition, in spite of its low 30 kilometres per hour (19 mph) top speed. In the 1989 experimental line project using the Class 100S vehicles, the technology was assessed by the Ministry of Transport and academic experts as having reached the stage of practical application. Subsequently, the lower-cost Class 100L was developed, and based on this vehicle, the Linimo was constructed. The Linimo opened in 2005 for the Expo 2005 and has since operated as a local public transport system, with a maximum speed of 100 kilometres per hour (62 mph).

=== New York, United States, 1967 ===
In 1961, while stuck in traffic, Brookhaven National Laboratory (BNL) researcher James Powell thought of using magnetic levitation technology to solve the congestion. Powell and BNL colleague Gordon Danby worked in their spare time to develop a maglev concept using static magnets mounted on a moving vehicle to induce electrodynamic lifting and stabilising forces in specially shaped loops. They applied for a patent for their system in 1967, which was granted in 1969.

=== Hamburg, Germany, 1979 ===
Transrapid 05 was the first maglev train with long-stator propulsion licensed for passenger transportation. In 1979, a 908 metres (2,979 ft) track was opened in Hamburg for the first International Transportation Exhibition (IVA 79). Interest was so strong that operations were extended for three months after the exhibition finished, during which more than 50,000 passengers were carried. The Transrapid 05 was reassembled in Kassel in 1980.

=== Ramenskoye, Moscow, USSR, 1979 ===
In 1979, the USSR town of Ramenskoye (Moscow oblast) built an experimental test site for running experiments with cars on magnetic suspension. The test site consisted of a 60-metre ramp, which was later extended to 980 metres. From the late 1970s to the 1980s five prototypes of cars were built that received designations from TP-01 (ТП-01) to TP-05 (ТП-05). The early cars were supposed to reach the speed up to 100 kilometres per hour (62 mph).

The construction of a maglev track using the technology from Ramenskoye started in Armenian SSR in 1987 and was planned to be completed in 1991. The track was supposed to connect the cities of Yerevan and Sevan via the city of Abovyan. The original design speed was 250 kilometres per hour (160 mph) which was later lowered to 180 kilometres per hour (110 mph). However, the Spitak earthquake in 1988 and the First Nagorno-Karabakh War caused the project to freeze. In the end, the overpass was only partially constructed.

In the early 1990s, the maglev theme was continued by the Engineering Research Center "TEMP" (ИНЦ "ТЭМП") this time by the order from the Moscow government. The project was named V250 (В250). The idea was to build a high-speed maglev train to connect Moscow to the Sheremetyevo airport. The train would consist of 64-seater cars and run at speeds up to 250 kilometres per hour (160 mph). In 1993, due to the financial crisis, the project was abandoned. However, since 1999, the "TEMP" research center has been participating as a co-developer in developing the linear motors for the Moscow Monorail system.

=== Birmingham, United Kingdom, 1984–1995 ===
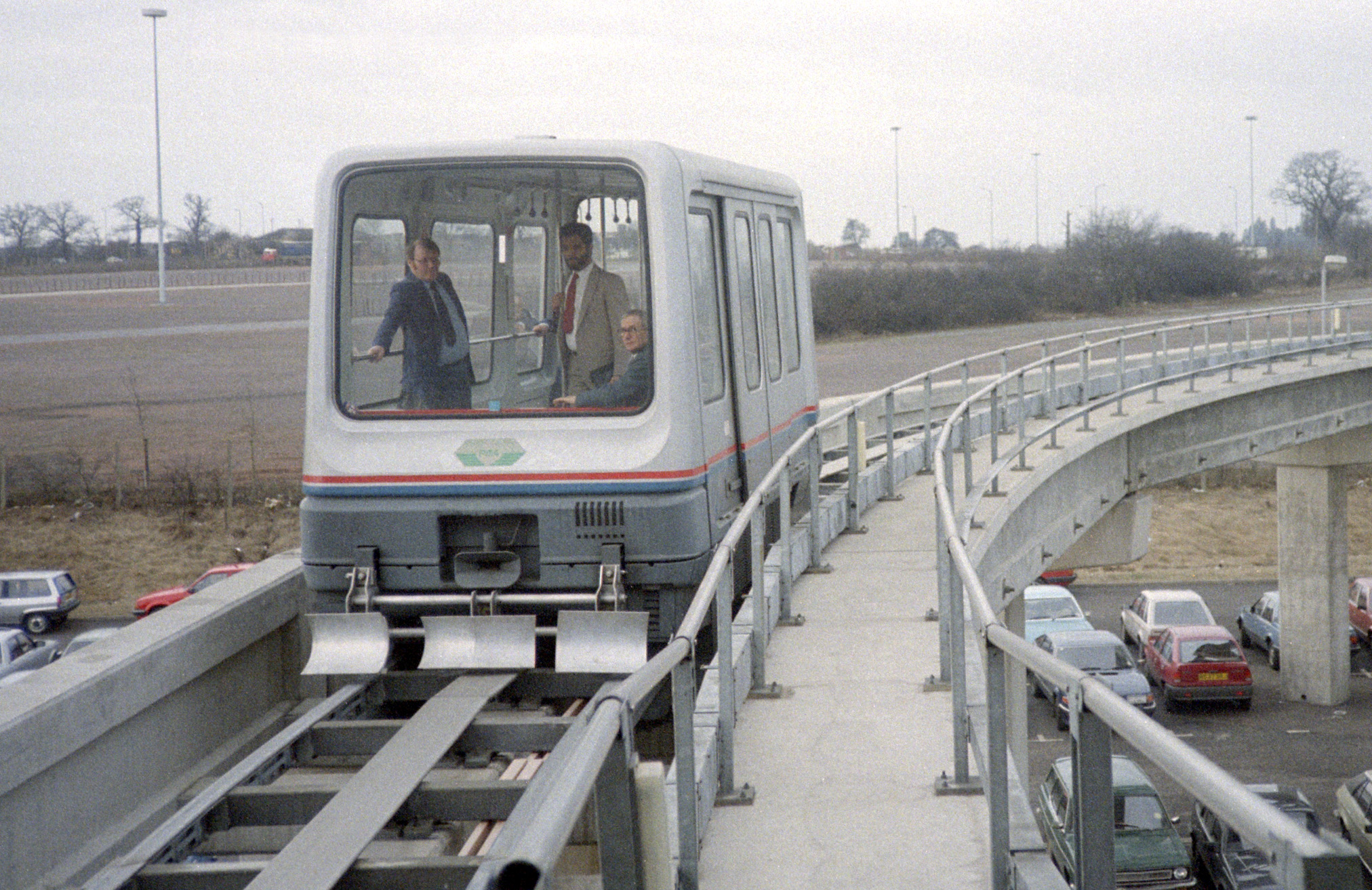
The Birmingham International Maglev shuttle

The world's first commercial maglev system was a low-speed maglev shuttle that ran between the airport terminal of Birmingham Airport and the nearby Birmingham International railway station between 1984 and 1995. Its track length was 600 metres (2,000 ft); trains levitated at an altitude of 15 millimetres [0.59 in], levitated by electromagnets, and propelled with linear induction motors. It operated for 11 years and was initially very popular with passengers, but obsolescence problems with the electronic systems made it progressively unreliable as years passed, leading to its closure in 1995. One of the original cars is now on display at Railworld in Peterborough, together with the RTV31 hover train vehicle. Another is on display at Locomotion Museum in Shildon, County Durham.

Several favorable conditions existed when the link was built:

- The British Rail Research vehicle was 3 tonnes, and the extension to the 8-tonne vehicle was easy.
- Electrical power was available.
- The airport and rail buildings were suitable for terminal platforms.
- Only one crossing over a public road was required, and no steep gradients were involved.
- Land was owned by the railway or airport.
- Local industries and councils were supportive.
- Some government finance was provided, and because of shared work, the cost per organization was low.

After the system closed in 1995, the original guideway lay dormant until 2003, when a replacement cable-hauled system, the AirRail Link Cable Liner people mover, was opened.

=== Emsland, Germany, 1984–2011 ===
Transrapid at the Emsland test facility

Transrapid, a German maglev company, had a test track in Emsland totaling 31.5 kilometres (19.6 mi). The single-track line ran between Dörpen and Lathen with turning loops at each end. The trains regularly ran at up to 420 kilometres per hour (260 mph). Paying passengers were carried as part of the testing process. The construction of the test facility began in 1980 and finished in 1984.

In 2006, a maglev train accident occurred in Lathen, killing 23 people. It was found to have been caused by human error in the implementation of safety checks. From 2006, no passengers were carried. At the end of 2011, the operating license expired and was not renewed; in early 2012, demolition permission was granted for its facilities, including the track and factory.

In March 2021, it was reported that the CRRC was investigating the revival of the Emsland test track. In May 2019, CRRC had unveiled its "CRRC 600" prototype, which is designed to reach 600 kilometres per hour (370 mph).

=== Vancouver, Canada, and Hamburg, Germany, 1986–1988 ===
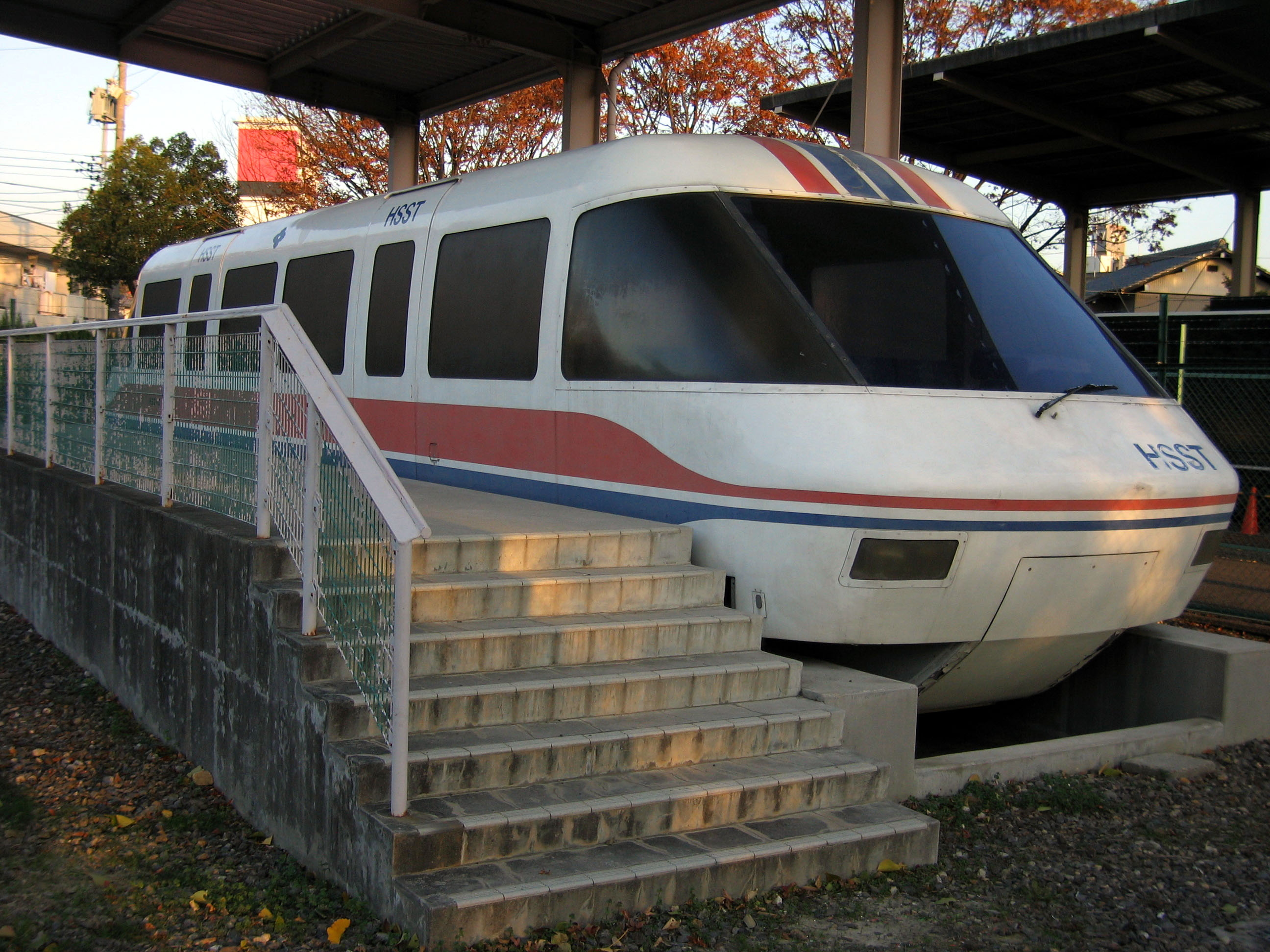
HSST-03 at Okazaki Minami Park

In Vancouver, Canada, the HSST-03 by HSST Development Corporation (Japan Airlines and Sumitomo Corporation) was exhibited at Expo 86, and ran on a 400-metre (0.25 mi) test track that provided guests with a ride in a single car along a short section of track at the fairgrounds. It was removed after the fair. It was shown at the Aoi Expo in 1987 and is now on static display at Okazaki Minami Park.

=== South Korea, 1993–2022, 2025–present ===
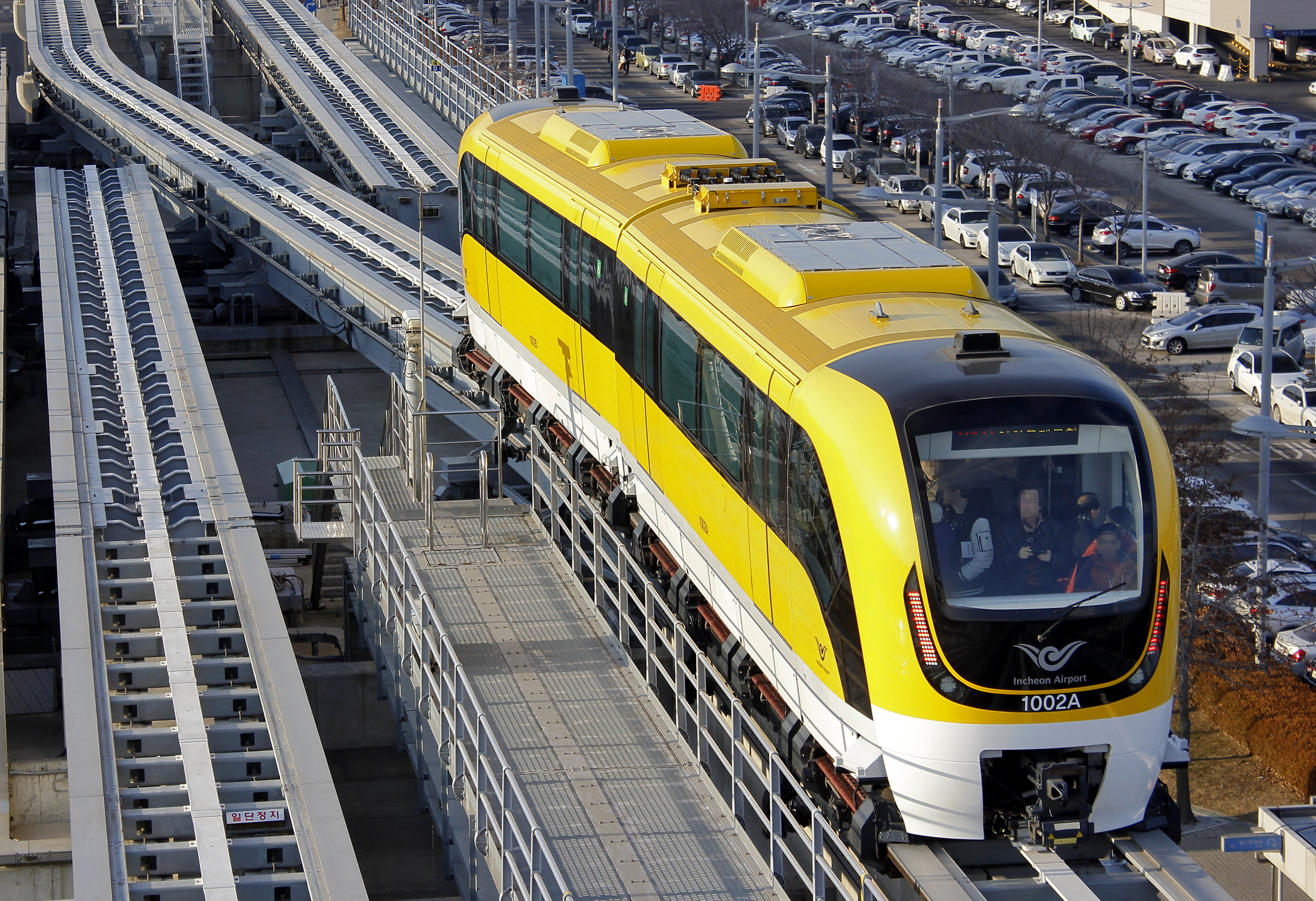
South Korea's Incheon Airport Maglev, the world's fourth commercially operating maglev

In 1993, South Korea completed the development of its own maglev train, shown off at the Daejeon Expo '93, which was developed further into a full-fledged maglev UTM-02 capable of traveling up to 110 kilometres per hour (68 mph) in 2006. This final model was incorporated in the Incheon Airport Maglev which opened on 3 February 2016, making South Korea the world's fourth country to operate its own self-developed maglev after the United Kingdom's Birmingham International Airport, Germany's Berlin M-Bahn, and Japan's Linimo. It links Incheon International Airport to the Yongyu Station and Leisure Complex on Yeongjong island. It offers a transfer to the Seoul Metropolitan Subway at AREX's Incheon International Airport Station and is offered free of charge to anyone to ride, operating between 9 am and 6 pm with 15-minute intervals.

The maglev system was co-developed by the South Korea Institute of Machinery and Materials (KIMM) and Hyundai Rotem. It is 6.1 kilometres (3.8 mi) long, with six stations and a 110 kilometres per hour (68 mph) operating speed.

Two more stages are planned of 9.7 kilometres (6 mi) and 37.4 kilometres (23.2 mi). Once completed, it will become a circular line.

The line was shut down in July 2022. It reopened "as a tourism and experiential facility rather than a public transportation service" in October 2025.

=== Brazil 2009–present ===
Maglev Cobra is a maglev system under development at the Federal University of Rio de Janeiro in Brazil. The prototype was unveiled in 2009.

=== Germany/China, 2010–present ===
Transport System Bögl (TSB) is a driverless maglev system developed by the German construction company Max Bögl since 2010. Its primary intended use is for short- to medium-distance travel (up to 30 km) and speeds up to 150 km/h, for uses such as airport shuttles. The company has been conducting test runs on an 820-metre-long test track at its headquarters in Sengenthal, Upper Palatinate, Germany, since 2012, clocking over 100,000 tests covering over 65,000 km as of 2018.

In 2018, Max Bögl entered into a joint venture with the Chinese company Chengdu Xinzhu Road & Bridge Machinery Co., granting the Chinese partner exclusive rights to production and marketing of the system in China. The joint venture constructed a 3.5 km (2.2 mi) demonstration line near Chengdu, China, and two vehicles were airlifted there in June 2020. In February 2021 a vehicle on the Chinese test track hit a top speed of 169 km/h (105 mph).

=== China, since 2000 ===
According to the International Maglev Board there are at least four maglev research programmes underway in China at:

- Southwest Jiaotong University (Chengdu)
- Tongji University (Shanghai)
- CRRC Tangshan-Changchun Railway Vehicle Co.
- Chengdu Aircraft Industry Group.

The latest high-speed prototype, unveiled in July 2021, was manufactured by CRRC Qingdao Sifang.

==== Low-to-medium speed ====
Development of the low-to-medium speed systems, that is, 100–200 km/h (62–124 mph), by the CRRC has led to opening lines such as the Changsha Maglev Express in 2016 and the Line S1 in Beijing in 2017. In April 2020, a new model capable of 160 km/h (99 mph) and compatible with the Changsha line completed testing. The vehicle, under development since 2018, has a 30 percent increase in traction efficiency and a 60 percent increase in speed over the stock in use on the line. The vehicles entered service in July 2021 with a top speed of 140 km/h (87 mph). CRRC Zhuzhou Locomotive said in April 2020 that it is developing a model capable of 200 km/h (120 mph).

==== High speed ====
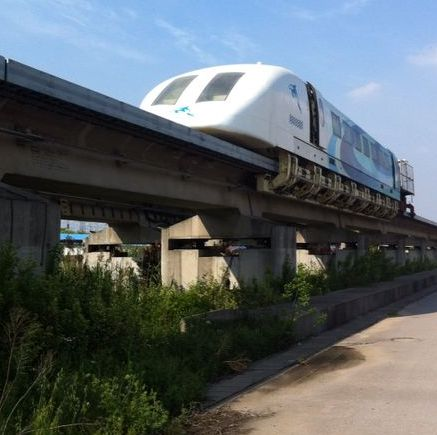
Maglev on the Tongji University test track

There are two competing efforts for high-speed maglev systems, i.e., 300–620 km/h (190–390 mph).

- The first is based on the Transrapid technology used in the Shanghai maglev train and is developed by the CRRC under license from Thyssen-Krupp.
  - In 2006 the 500 km/h (310 mph) CM1 Dolphin prototype was unveiled and began testing on a new 1.5-kilometre (0.93 mi) test track at Tongji University, northwest of Shanghai.
  - A prototype vehicle of the 600 km/h (370 mph) CRRC 600 was developed in 2019 and tested from June 2020.
  - In March 2021 a 300 km/h (190 mph) model began trials.
  - In July 2021, the CRRC 600 maglev, planned to travel at up to 600 km/h (370 mph), was unveiled in Qingdao.
  - A high-speed test track is under development in China, and in April 2021, consideration was given to reopening the Emsland test facility in Germany.
- A second, incompatible high-speed prototype was constructed by Max Bögl and Chengdu Xinzhu Road & Bridge Machinery Co. Ltd. and unveiled in January 2021. Developed at Southwest Jiaotong University in Chengdu, the Super Bullet Maglev design uses high-temperature superconducting magnets and has a proposed top speed of 620 km/h (390 mph). However, at the time of its unveiling, testing was limited to low-speed runs on a 165-metre (180 yd) test track using a full-scale model.

== Technology ==
Maglev systems may be monorail or dual rail, powered by a linear motor—the SCMaglev MLX01, for instance, uses a trench-like track—and not all monorail trains are maglevs. Some railway transport systems incorporate linear motors but use electromagnetism only for propulsion, without levitating the vehicle. Such trains have wheels and are not maglevs. (Note: This is the case with the Moscow Monorail—currently the only non-maglev linear motor-propelled monorail train in active service.) Maglev tracks, monorail or not, can also be constructed at grade or underground in tunnels. Conversely, non-maglev tracks, monorail or not, can be elevated or underground too. Some maglev trains incorporate wheels and operate like linear-motor-propelled wheeled vehicles at slower speeds, but levitate at higher speeds. This is typically the case with electrodynamic suspension maglev trains. Aerodynamic factors may also play a role in the levitation of such trains.

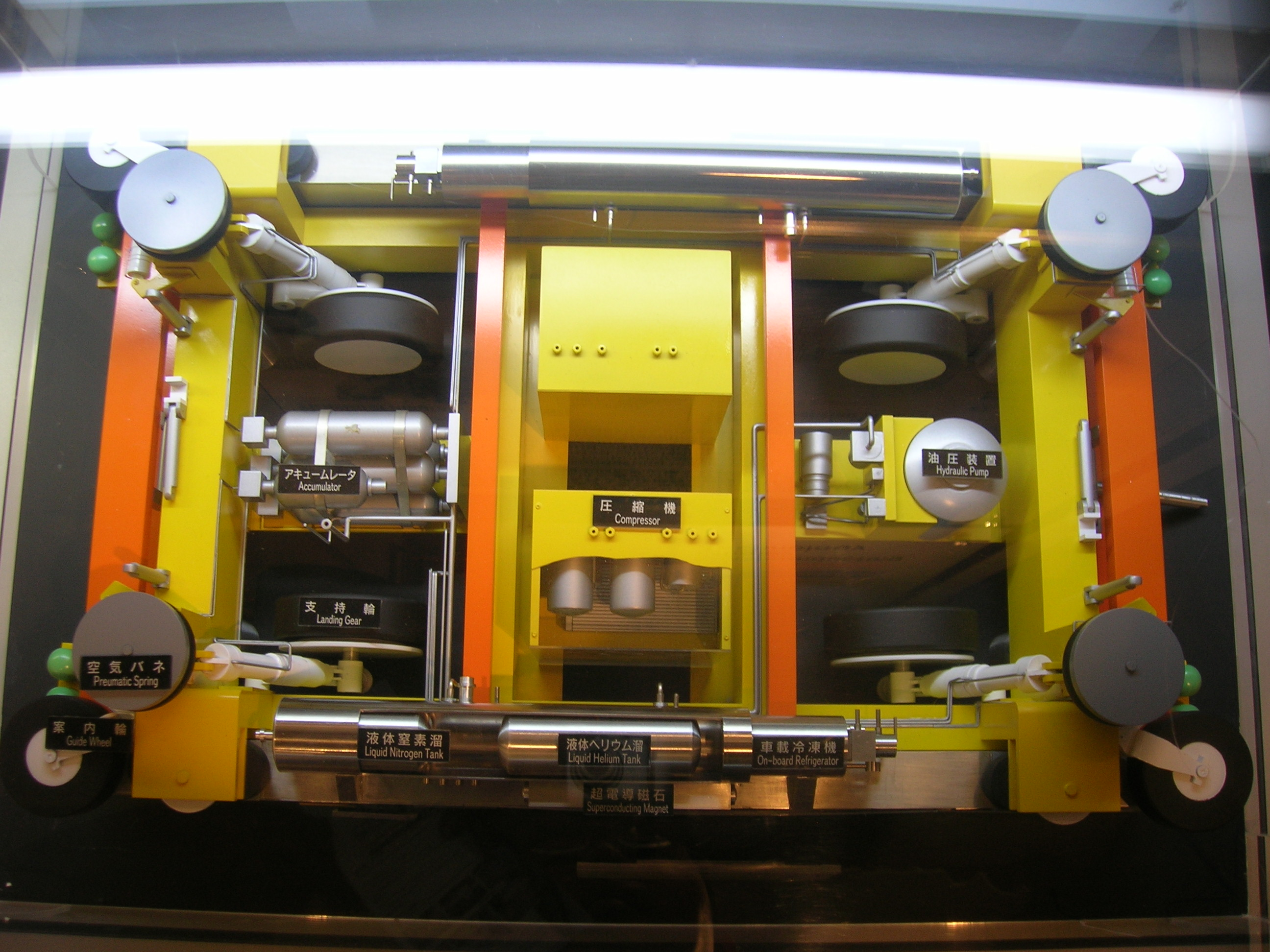
MLX01 Maglev train superconducting magnet bogie

The two main types of maglev technology are:

- Electromagnetic suspension (EMS), electronically controlled electromagnets in the train attract it to a magnetically conductive (usually steel) track.
- Electrodynamic suspension (EDS) uses superconducting electromagnets or strong permanent magnets that create a toroidal magnetic field, which induces currents in nearby metallic conductors when there is relative movement, which pushes and pulls the train towards the designed levitation position on the guide way.

=== Electromagnetic suspension (EMS) ===
Electromagnetic suspension (EMS) is used to levitate the Transrapid on the track, so that the train can be faster than wheeled mass transit systems.

In electromagnetic suspension (EMS) systems, the train levitates by attraction to a ferromagnetic (usually steel) rail while electromagnets, attached to the train, are oriented toward the rail from below. The system is typically arranged on a series of C-shaped arms, with the upper portion of each arm attached to the vehicle and the lower inner edge containing the magnets. The rail is situated inside the C, between the upper and lower edges.

Magnetic attraction varies inversely with the square of distance, so minor changes in distance between the magnets and the rail produce greatly varying forces. These changes in force are dynamically unstable—a slight divergence from the optimum position tends to grow, requiring sophisticated feedback systems to maintain a constant distance from the track, (approximately 15 millimetres [0.59 in]).

The major advantage of suspended maglev systems is that they work at all speeds, unlike electrodynamic systems, which only work at a minimum speed of about 30 kilometres per hour (19 mph). This eliminates the need for a separate low-speed suspension system and can simplify track layout. On the downside, dynamic instability requires tight track tolerances, which can offset this advantage. Eric Laithwaite was concerned that to meet required tolerances, the gap between magnets and rail would have to be increased to the point where the magnets would be unreasonably large. In practice, this problem was addressed through improved feedback systems, which support the required tolerances.

==== Hybrid electromagnetic suspension (H-EMS) ====
Hybrid electromagnetic suspension (H-EMS) is a variation on EMS that uses permanent magnets to provide the main lifting force. Because the electromagnets only need to provide stabilisation, the air gap can be increased and the energy usage reduced.

=== Electrodynamic suspension (EDS) ===
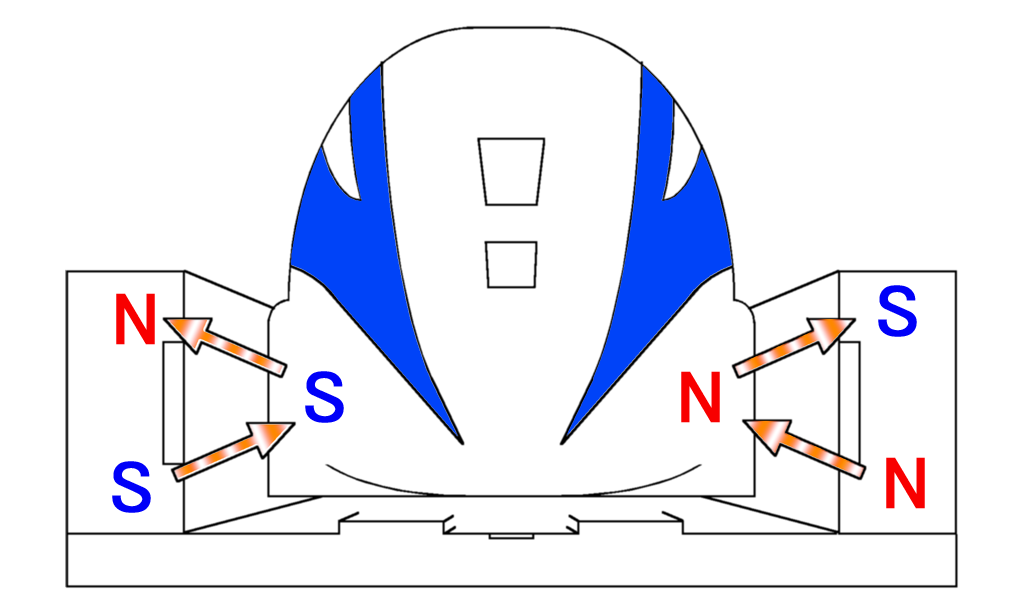
The Japanese SCMaglev's EDS suspension is powered by the magnetic fields induced either side of the vehicle by the passage of the vehicle's superconducting magnets.

EDS maglev propulsion via propulsion coils

In electrodynamic suspension (EDS), both the guideway and the train exert a magnetic field, and the repulsive and attractive force between these magnetic fields levitates the train. In some configurations, the train can be levitated only by repulsive force. In the early stages of maglev development at the Miyazaki test track, a purely repulsive system was used instead of the later repulsive and attractive EDS system. The magnetic field is produced either by superconducting magnets (as in JR–Maglev) or by an array of permanent magnets (as in Inductrack). The repulsive and attractive force in the track is created by an induced magnetic field in wires or other conducting strips in the track.

A major advantage of EDS maglev systems is that they are dynamically stable—changes in the distance between the track and the magnets generate strong forces that return the system to its original position. In addition, the attractive force varies oppositely, providing the same adjustment effects. No active feedback control is needed.

However, at slow speeds, the current induced in these coils and the resultant magnetic flux are not large enough to levitate the train. For this reason, the train must have wheels or another form of landing gear to support it until it reaches take-off speed. Since a train may stop at any location, for instance, due to equipment problems, the entire track must be able to support both low- and high-speed operation.

Another downside is that the EDS system naturally creates a field in the track in front of and behind the lift magnets, which opposes the magnets and induces magnetic drag. This is generally only a concern at low speeds, and is one of the reasons why JR abandoned a purely repulsive system and adopted the sidewall levitation system. At higher speeds, other modes of drag dominate.

The drag force can be used to the electrodynamic system's advantage, however, as it creates a varying force in the rails that can be used as a reactionary system to drive the train, without the need for a separate reaction plate, as in most linear motor systems. Laithwaite led the development of such "traverse-flux" systems at his Imperial College laboratory. Alternatively, propulsion coils on the guideway are used to exert a force on the magnets in the train and make the train move forward. The propulsion coils that exert a force on the train are effectively a linear motor: an alternating current through the coils generates a continuously varying magnetic field that moves forward along the track. The frequency of the alternating current is synchronized with the train's speed. The offset between the field exerted by the magnets on the train and the applied field creates a force that moves the train forward.

=== Tracks ===
The term maglev refers not only to the vehicles but also to the railway system, specifically designed for magnetic levitation and propulsion. All operational implementations of maglev technology rely minimally on wheeled train technology and are not compatible with conventional rail tracks. Because they cannot share existing infrastructure, maglev systems must be designed as standalone systems. The SPM maglev system is interoperable with steel rail tracks, allowing maglev vehicles and conventional trains to operate on the same tracks. MAN in Germany also designed a maglev system that worked with conventional rails, but it was never fully developed.

=== Evaluation ===
Each implementation of the magnetic levitation principle for train-type travel involves advantages and disadvantages.

Technology	Pros	Cons
EMS (electromagnetic suspension)	Magnetic fields inside and outside the vehicle are less than EDS; proven, commercially available technology; high speeds (500 kilometres per hour or 310 miles per hour); no wheels or secondary propulsion system needed.	The separation between the vehicle and the guideway must be constantly monitored and corrected due to the unstable nature of electromagnetic attraction; the system's inherent instability and the required constant corrections by outside systems may induce vibration.
EDS (electrodynamic suspension)	Onboard magnets and a large margin between rail and train enable the highest-recorded speeds (603 kilometres per hour or 375 miles per hour) and heavy load capacity; demonstrated successful operations using high-temperature superconductors in its onboard magnets, cooled with inexpensive liquid nitrogen.	Strong magnetic fields on the train would make the train unsafe for passengers with pacemakers or magnetic data storage media such as hard drives and credit cards, necessitating the use of magnetic shielding; limitations on guideway inductivity limit maximum speed; vehicle must be wheeled for travel at low speeds.
Inductrack system (permanent magnet passive suspension)	Failsafe suspension—no power required to activate magnets; Magnetic field is localised below the car; can generate enough force at low speeds (around 5 kilometres per hour or 3.1 miles per hour) for levitation; given power failure cars stop safely; Halbach arrays of permanent magnets may prove more cost-effective than electromagnets.	Requires either wheels or track segments that move when the vehicle is stopped. Under development as of 2008; no commercial version or full-scale prototype.

Neither Inductrack nor the Superconducting EDS can levitate vehicles at a standstill, although Inductrack provides levitation at much lower speeds; wheels are required for these systems. EMS systems are wheel-free.

The German Transrapid, Japanese HSST (Linimo), and Korean Rotem EMS maglevs levitate at a standstill, with electricity extracted from the guideway using power rails for the latter two, and wirelessly for Transrapid. If guideway power is lost while in motion, the Transrapid can still generate levitation down to 10 kilometres per hour (6.2 mph) using power from onboard batteries. This is not the case with the HSST and Rotem systems.

==== Propulsion ====
EMS systems such as HSST/Linimo can provide both levitation and propulsion using an onboard linear motor. But EDS systems and some EMS systems, such as Transrapid, levitate without propulsion. Such systems require additional propulsion technology. A linear motor (propulsion coils) mounted in the track is one solution. Over long distances, coil costs could be prohibitive.

==== Stability ====
Earnshaw's theorem shows that no combination of static magnets can be in a stable equilibrium. Therefore, a dynamic (time varying) magnetic field is required to achieve stabilization. EMS systems rely on active electronic stabilization that constantly measures the bearing distance and adjusts the electromagnet current accordingly. EDS systems rely on changing magnetic fields to create currents, which can give passive stability.

Because maglev vehicles essentially fly, pitch, roll, and yaw stabilization are required. In addition to rotation, surge (forward-and-backward motion), sway (sideways motion), or heave (up-and-down motion) can be problematic.

Superconducting magnets on a train above a track made out of a permanent magnet lock the train into its lateral position. It can move linearly along the track but not off it. This is due to the Meissner effect and flux pinning.

==== Guidance system ====
Some systems use Null Current systems (also sometimes called Null Flux systems). These use a coil that is wound so that it enters two opposing, alternating fields, so that the average flux in the loop is zero. When the vehicle is in the straight-ahead position, no current flows, but any moves off-line create flux that generates a field that naturally pushes/pulls it back into line.

=== Proposed technology enhancements ===
==== Evacuated tubes ====
Some systems (notably the Swissmetro system and the Hyperloop) propose using vactrains—maglev trains running in a tunnel with a partial or total vacuum, which reduces or eliminates air drag. This has the potential to greatly increase speed and efficiency, as most of the energy in conventional maglev trains is lost to aerodynamic drag.

One potential risk for passengers on trains operating in evacuated tubes is exposure to cabin depressurization unless tunnel safety monitoring systems can repressurize the tube in the event of a train malfunction or accident. Since trains are likely to operate at or near the Earth's surface, emergency restoration of ambient pressure should be straightforward. The RAND Corporation has depicted a vacuum-tube train that could, in theory, cross the Atlantic or the US in about 21 minutes.

==== Rail-maglev hybrid ====
The Polish startup Nevomo (previously Hyper Poland) is developing a system for modifying existing railway tracks into a maglev system, on which conventional wheel-rail trains, as well maglev vehicles can travel. Vehicles on this so-called 'magrail' system will be able to reach speeds of up to 300 kilometres per hour (190 mph) at significantly lower infrastructure costs than stand-alone maglev lines. In 2023, Nevomo conducted the first MagRail tests on Europe's longest test track for passive magnetic levitation, which the company had previously built in Poland.

==== Ringway Transportation System ====
The Ringway Transportation System is a conceptual mass transit design that proposes moving vehicles linearly using a series of intermittent pillar supports rather than a continuous rail track or tube. Unlike standard trains or traditional high-speed maglev lines, it works by reversing the standard orientation of wheels and rails, embedding the propulsive or magnetic components directly into a sequence of isolated ringway pillars.

=== Energy use ===
Energy is consumed to levitate and propulsion. Energy may be regained when the train slows down via regenerative braking. At higher speeds, most of the energy is needed to overcome air drag. Some energy is used for air conditioning, heating, lighting, and other miscellaneous uses.

At low speeds, the percentage of power used for levitation can be significant, consuming up to 15% more power than a subway or light rail service. For short distances, the energy used for acceleration might be considerable.

The force required to overcome air drag increases with the square of the velocity and thus dominates at high speeds. The energy required per unit distance increases with the square of the velocity, while the time decreases linearly. However, power increases by the cube of the velocity. For example, 2.37 times as much power is needed to travel at 400 kilometres per hour (250 mph) than 300 kilometres per hour (190 mph), while drag increases by 1.77 times the original force.

Aircraft take advantage of lower air pressure and lower temperatures by cruising at altitude to reduce energy consumption, but unlike trains, they need to carry fuel on board. This has led to the suggestion of conveying maglev vehicles through partially evacuated tubes.

=== High-speed maglev comparison with conventional high-speed trains ===
Maglev transport is non-contact and electric-powered. It relies less or not at all on the wheels, bearings, and axles common to wheeled rail systems.

- Speed: Maglev allows higher top speeds than conventional rail. While experimental wheel-based high-speed trains have demonstrated similar speeds, conventional trains will suffer from friction between wheels and track, thereby increasing maintenance costs at such speeds, unlike levitated maglev trains.
- Maintenance: Maglev trains currently in operation have demonstrated the need for minimal guideway maintenance. Vehicle maintenance is also minimal (based on hours of operation, rather than on speed or distance traveled). Traditional rail is subject to mechanical wear and tear that increases rapidly with speed, also increasing maintenance. For example, the wearing down of brakes and overhead wire wear have caused problems for the Fastech 360 rail Shinkansen. Maglev would eliminate these issues.
- Weather: In theory, maglev trains should be unaffected by snow, ice, severe cold, rain, or high winds. However, as of yet, no maglev system has been installed in a location with such a harsh climate.
- Acceleration: Maglev vehicles accelerate and decelerate faster than mechanical systems regardless of the slickness of the guideway or the slope of the grade, because they are non-contact systems.
- Track: Maglev trains are not compatible with conventional track, and therefore require custom infrastructure for their entire route. By contrast, conventional high-speed trains such as the TGV can run, albeit at reduced speeds, on existing rail infrastructure, thus reducing expenditure where new infrastructure would be particularly expensive (such as the final approaches to city terminals), or on extensions where traffic does not justify new infrastructure. John Harding, former chief maglev scientist at the Federal Railroad Administration, claimed that separate maglev infrastructure more than pays for itself through higher all-weather operational availability and nominal maintenance costs. These claims have yet to be proven in an intensive operational setting, and they do not account for the increased maglev construction costs. However, in countries like China, there are discussions of building some key conventional high-speed rail tunnels/bridges to a standard that would allow them to be upgraded to maglev.
- Efficiency: Conventional rail is probably more efficient at lower speeds. But due to the lack of physical contact between the track and the vehicle, maglev trains experience no rolling resistance, leaving only air resistance and electromagnetic drag, which can improve power efficiency. Some systems, however, such as the Central Japan Railway Company SCMaglev use rubber tires at low speeds, reducing efficiency gains.
- Mass: The electromagnets in many EMS and EDS designs require between 1 and 2 kilowatts per ton. The use of superconductor magnets can reduce the electromagnets' energy consumption. A 50-ton Transrapid maglev vehicle can lift an additional 20 tons, for a total of 70 tons, which consumes 70–140 kilowatts (94–188 hp). Most energy use for the TRI is for propulsion and overcoming air resistance at speeds over 100 miles per hour (160 km/h).
- Weight loading: High-speed rail requires more support and construction for its concentrated wheel loading. Maglev cars are lighter and distribute weight more evenly.
- Noise: Because the major source of noise of a maglev train comes from displaced air rather than from wheels touching rails, maglev trains produce less noise than a conventional train at equivalent speeds. However, the psychoacoustic profile of the maglev may reduce this benefit: a study concluded that maglev noise should be rated like road traffic, while conventional trains experience a 5–10 dB "bonus", as they are found less annoying at the same loudness level.
- Magnet reliability: Superconducting magnets are generally used to generate the powerful magnetic fields to levitate and propel the trains. These magnets must be kept below their critical temperatures (this ranges from 4.2 K to 77 K, depending on the material). New alloys and manufacturing techniques in superconductors and cooling systems have helped address this issue.
- Control systems: No signaling systems are needed for high-speed maglev, because such systems are computer-controlled. Human operators cannot react fast enough to manage high-speed trains. High-speed systems require dedicated rights-of-way and are usually elevated. Two maglev system microwave towers are in constant contact with trains. There is no need for train whistles or horns, either.
- Terrain: Maglevs can ascend higher grades, offering more routing flexibility and reduced tunneling.

=== High-speed maglev comparison with aircraft ===
Differences between airplane and maglev travel:

- Efficiency: For maglev systems, the lift-to-drag ratio can exceed that of aircraft (for example, Inductrack can approach 200:1 at high speed, far higher than any aircraft). This can make maglevs more efficient per kilometre. However, at high cruising speeds, aerodynamic drag is much larger than lift-induced drag. Jet-powered aircraft take advantage of low air density at high altitudes to significantly reduce air drag. Hence, despite their lift-to-drag ratio disadvantage, they can travel more efficiently at high speeds than maglev trains that operate at sea level.
- Routing: Maglevs offer competitive journey times for distances of 800 kilometres (500 mi) or less. Additionally, maglevs can easily serve intermediate destinations. Air routes don't require infrastructure between the origin and destination airport and therefore provide greater flexibility to modify service endpoints as needed.
- Availability: Maglevs are little affected by weather.
- Travel time: Maglevs do not face the extended security protocols faced by air travelers, nor is time consumed for taxiing, or for queuing for take-off and landing.

== Economics ==
As more maglev systems are deployed, experts expect construction costs to drop through the use of new construction methods and economies of scale.

=== High-Speed systems ===
The Shanghai maglev demonstration line cost US$1.2 billion to build in 2004. This total includes capital costs such as right-of-way clearing, extensive pile driving, on-site guideway manufacturing, in-situ pier construction at 25 metres (82 ft) intervals, a maintenance facility and vehicle yard, several switches, two stations, operations and control systems, power feed system, cables and inverters, and operational training. Ridership is not a primary focus of this demonstration line, since the Longyang Road station is on the eastern outskirts of Shanghai. Once the line is extended to South Shanghai Train station and Hongqiao Airport station, which may not happen because of economic reasons, ridership was expected to cover operation and maintenance costs and generate significant net revenue.

The South Shanghai extension was expected to cost approximately US$18 million per kilometre. In 2006, the German government invested $125 million in guideway cost-reduction development, producing an all-concrete modular design that is faster to build and 30% less costly. Other new construction techniques were also developed that put maglev at or below price parity with new high-speed rail construction.

In South Korea, the operational Incheon Airport Maglev, launched in 2016, exemplifies a lower-speed, urban application in which construction costs (approximately US$65 million per kilometre) have proven more manageable, offering a model for cost-effective deployment in densely populated areas.

Because maglev trains eliminate mechanical friction through magnetic levitation, their maintenance requirements tend to be lower than those for conventional high-speed rail. Advanced systems - such as those using superconducting magnets or adaptive control for energy management - further reduce operating costs. For instance, some designs claim energy consumption reductions of up to 30% compared with earlier maglev systems, with lower long-term maintenance expenses owing to reduced wear. U.S. studies on proposed corridors (e.g. the Baltimore-Washington Rapid Rail project) have estimated construction costs in the range of US$50–100 million per mile, while also highlighting potential benefits such as job creation during both the construction and operation phases.

The primary economic rationale for maglev is the dramatic reduction in travel times, which could result in substantial productivity gains and drive regional economic integration. In Japan, the time savings offered by the Chuo Shinkansen are projected to generate benefits on the order of several trillion yen over its operational lifetime. Similarly, proposals in the United States emphasize the dual benefits of rapid intercity connectivity and reduced highway congestion, despite the need to overcome political and funding challenges. German research into the Transrapid system - which, although not deployed commercially, led to innovations in modular guideway manufacturing that reduced costs by up to 30% - further supports the potential for maglev systems to achieve price parity with new high-speed rail lines under the right conditions. In Switzerland, while full-scale commercial maglev has not yet been implemented, ongoing R&D (including Hyperloop inspired tests) indicates that similar cost-saving measures could eventually be applied in European markets.

=== Low-Speed systems ===
The Japanese Linimo HSST cost approximately US$100 million/km to build. Besides offering improved operation and maintenance costs over other transit systems, these low-speed maglevs provide ultra-high levels of operational reliability and introduce little noise and generate zero air pollution into dense urban settings.

== Records ==
The highest-recorded maglev speed is 603 kilometres per hour (375 mph), achieved in Japan by JR Central's L0 superconducting maglev on 21 April 2015, 28 kilometres per hour (17 mph) faster than the conventional TGV wheel-rail speed record. However, the operational and performance differences between these two very different technologies are far greater. The TGV record was achieved, accelerating down a 72.4 kilometres (45 mi) slight decline, requiring 13 minutes. It then took another 77.25 kilometres (48 mi) for the TGV to stop, bringing the total distance for the test to 149.65 kilometres (93 mi). The L0 record, however, was achieved on the 42.8 kilometres (26.6 mi) Yamanashi test track – less than one-third the distance. No maglev or wheel-rail commercial operation has actually been attempted at speeds over 500 kilometres per hour (310 mph).

=== History of maglev speed records ===
List of speed records set by maglev vehicles, by date, sortable
Year	Country	Train	Speed	Notes
1971	West Germany	Prinzipfahrzeug	90 kilometres per hour (56 mph)	
1971	West Germany	TR-02 (TSST)	164 kilometres per hour (102 mph)	
1972	Japan	ML100	60 kilometres per hour (37 mph)	crewed
1973	West Germany	TR04	250 kilometres per hour (160 mph)	crewed
1974	West Germany	EET-01	230 kilometres per hour (140 mph)	uncrewed
1975	West Germany	Komet	401 kilometres per hour (249 mph)	by steam rocket propulsion, uncrewed
1978	Japan	HSST-01	308 kilometres per hour (191 mph)	by supporting rockets propulsion, made in Nissan, uncrewed
1978	Japan	HSST-02	110 kilometres per hour (68 mph)	crewed
1979-12-12	Japan	ML-500R	504 kilometres per hour (313 mph)	(uncrewed) It succeeds in operation over 500 kilometres per hour (310 mph) for the first time in the world.
1979-12-21	Japan	ML-500R	517 kilometres per hour (321 mph)	(uncrewed)
1987	West Germany	TR-06	406 kilometres per hour (252 mph)	(crewed)
1987	Japan	MLU001	401 kilometres per hour (249 mph)	(crewed)
1988	West Germany	TR-06	413 kilometres per hour (257 mph)	(crewed)
1989	West Germany	TR-07	436 kilometres per hour (271 mph)	(crewed)
1993	Germany	TR-07	450 kilometres per hour (280 mph)	(crewed)
1994	Japan	MLU002N	431 kilometres per hour (268 mph)	(uncrewed)
1997	Japan	MLX01	531 kilometres per hour (330 mph)	(crewed)
1997	Japan	MLX01	550 kilometres per hour (340 mph)	(uncrewed)
1999	Japan	MLX01	552 kilometres per hour (343 mph)	(crewed/five-car formation) Guinness authorization.
2003	Japan	MLX01	581 kilometres per hour (361 mph)	(crewed/three formation) Guinness authorization.
2015	Japan	L0	590 kilometres per hour (370 mph)	(crewed/seven-car formation)
2015	Japan	L0	603 kilometres per hour (375 mph)	(crewed/seven-car formation) Guinness authorization.

== Systems ==
=== Operational systems ===
==== High speed ====
===== Shanghai Maglev (2003) =====
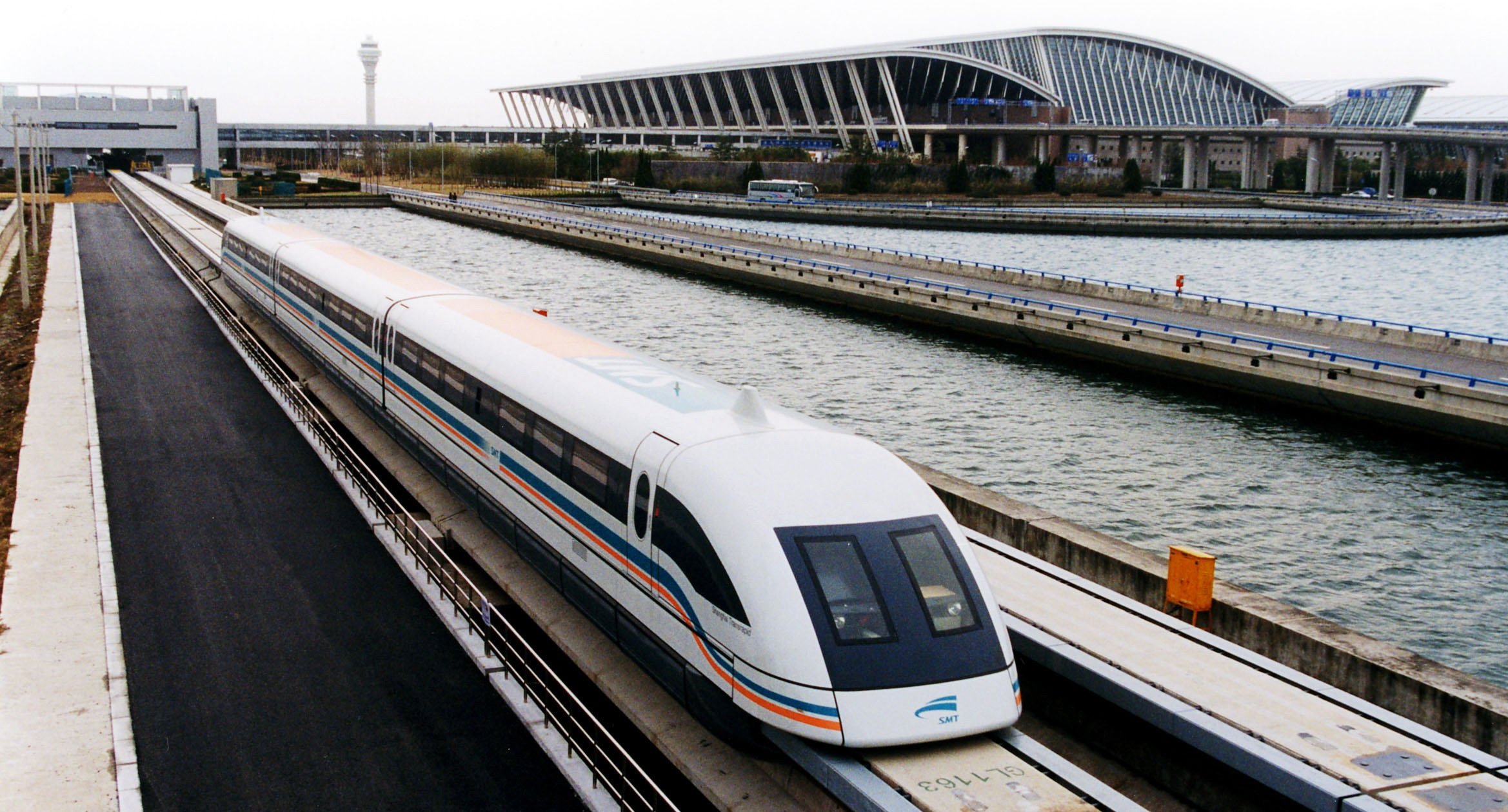
A maglev train coming out of the Pudong International Airport

The Shanghai Maglev Train, an implementation of the German Transrapid system, has a top speed of 300 kilometres per hour (190 mph). The line is the fastest and first commercially operational high-speed maglev. It connects Shanghai Pudong International Airport and the outskirts of central Pudong, Shanghai. The service covers a distance of 30.5 kilometres (19.0 mi) in just 8 minutes.

In January 2001, the Chinese signed an agreement with Transrapid to build an EMS high-speed maglev line linking Pudong International Airport to Longyang Road Metro station on the southeastern edge of Shanghai. This Shanghai Maglev Train demonstration line, or Initial Operating Segment (IOS), has been in commercial operations since April 2004 and now operates 115 daily trips (up from 110 in 2010) that traverse the 30 kilometres (19 mi) between the two stations in 8 minutes, achieving a top speed of 300 kilometres per hour (190 mph) and averaging 224 kilometres per hour (139 mph). Before May 2021, services operated at up to 431 kilometres per hour (268 mph), taking only 7 minutes to complete the trip. On a 12 November 2003 system commissioning test run, it achieved 501 kilometres per hour (311 mph), its designed top cruising speed. The Shanghai maglev is faster than Birmingham technology and offers on—time—to—the—second reliability greater than 99.97%.

Plans to extend the line to Shanghai South Railway Station and Hongqiao Airport on the northwestern edge of Shanghai are on hold. After the Shanghai–Hangzhou Passenger Railway became operational in late 2010, the maglev extension became somewhat redundant and may be canceled.

==== Low speed ====
===== Linimo (Tobu Kyuryo Line, Japan) (2005) =====
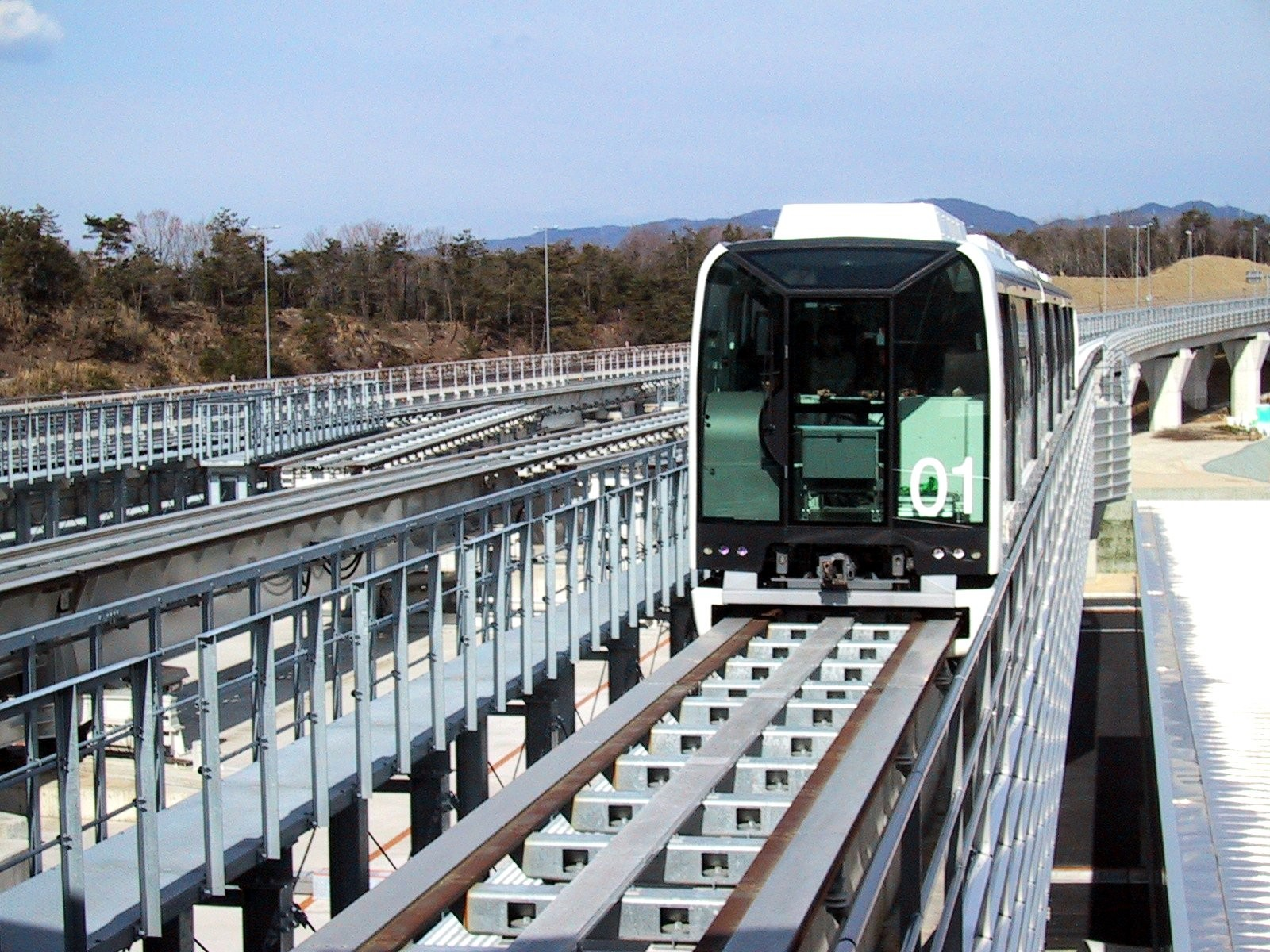
Linimo train approaching Banpaku Kinen Koen, towards Fujigaoka Station in March 2005

The commercial automated "Urban Maglev" system commenced operation in March 2005 in Aichi, Japan. The Tobu Kyuryo Line, otherwise known as the Linimo line, covers 9 kilometres (5.6 mi). It has a minimum operating radius of 75 metres (246 ft) and a maximum gradient of 6%. The linear-motor magnetically levitated train has a top speed of 100 kilometres per hour (62 mph). More than 10 million passengers used this "urban maglev" line in its first three months of operation. At 100 kilometres per hour (62 mph), it is sufficiently fast for frequent stops, has little or no noise impact on surrounding communities, can navigate short radius rights of way, and operates during inclement weather. The trains were designed by the Chubu HSST Development Corporation, which also operates a test track in Nagoya.

===== Changsha Maglev (2016) =====
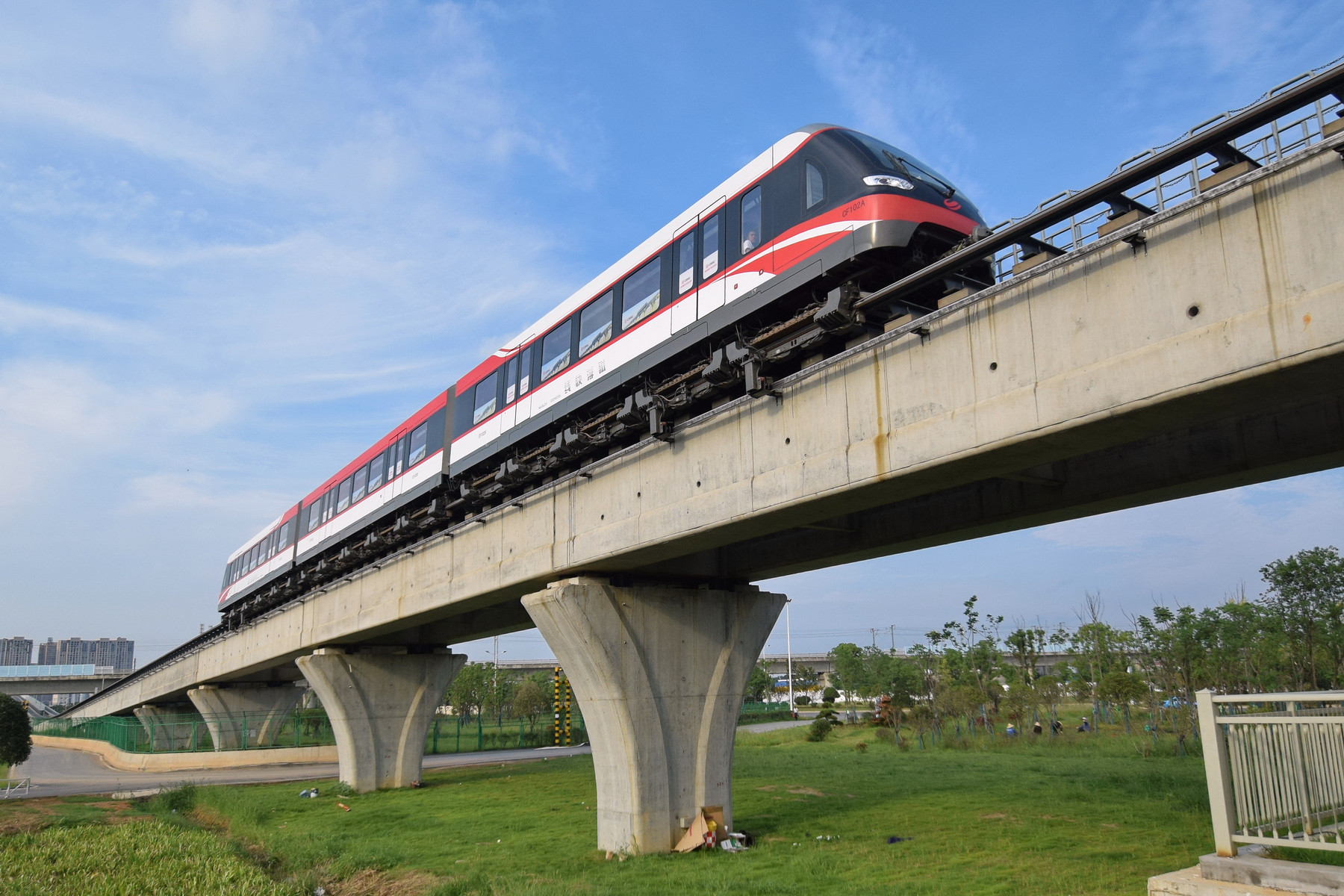
Changsha Maglev Train arriving at Langli Station

The Hunan provincial government launched the construction of a maglev line between Changsha Huanghua International Airport and Changsha South Railway Station, covering a distance of 18.55 km. Construction started in May 2014 and was completed by the end of 2015. Trial runs began on 26 December 2015 and trial operations started on 6 May 2016. As of 13 June 2018 the Changsha maglev had covered a distance of 1.7 million km and carried nearly 6 million passengers. A second generation of these vehicles has been produced, which have a top speed of 160 km/h (99 mph). In July 2021 the new model entered service operating at a top speed of 140 km/h (87 mph), which reduced the travel time by 3 minutes.

===== Beijing Line S1 (2017) =====
Beijing has built China's second low-speed maglev line, Line S1, Beijing Subway, using technology developed by National University of Defense Technology. The line was opened on 30 December 2017. The line operates at speeds up to 100 kilometres per hour (62 mph).

===== Fenghuang Maglev (2022) =====
Fenghuang Maglev (凤凰磁浮) is a medium- to low-speed maglev line in Fenghuang County, Xiangxi, Hunan province, China. The line operates at speeds up to 100 kilometres per hour (62 mph). The first phase is 9.12 kilometres (5.67 mi) with 4 stations (and 2 more future infill stations). The first phase opened on 30 July 2022 and connects the Fenghuanggucheng railway station on the Zhangjiajie–Jishou–Huaihua high-speed railway with the Fenghuang Folklore Garden.

===== Qingyuan Maglev (2025) =====
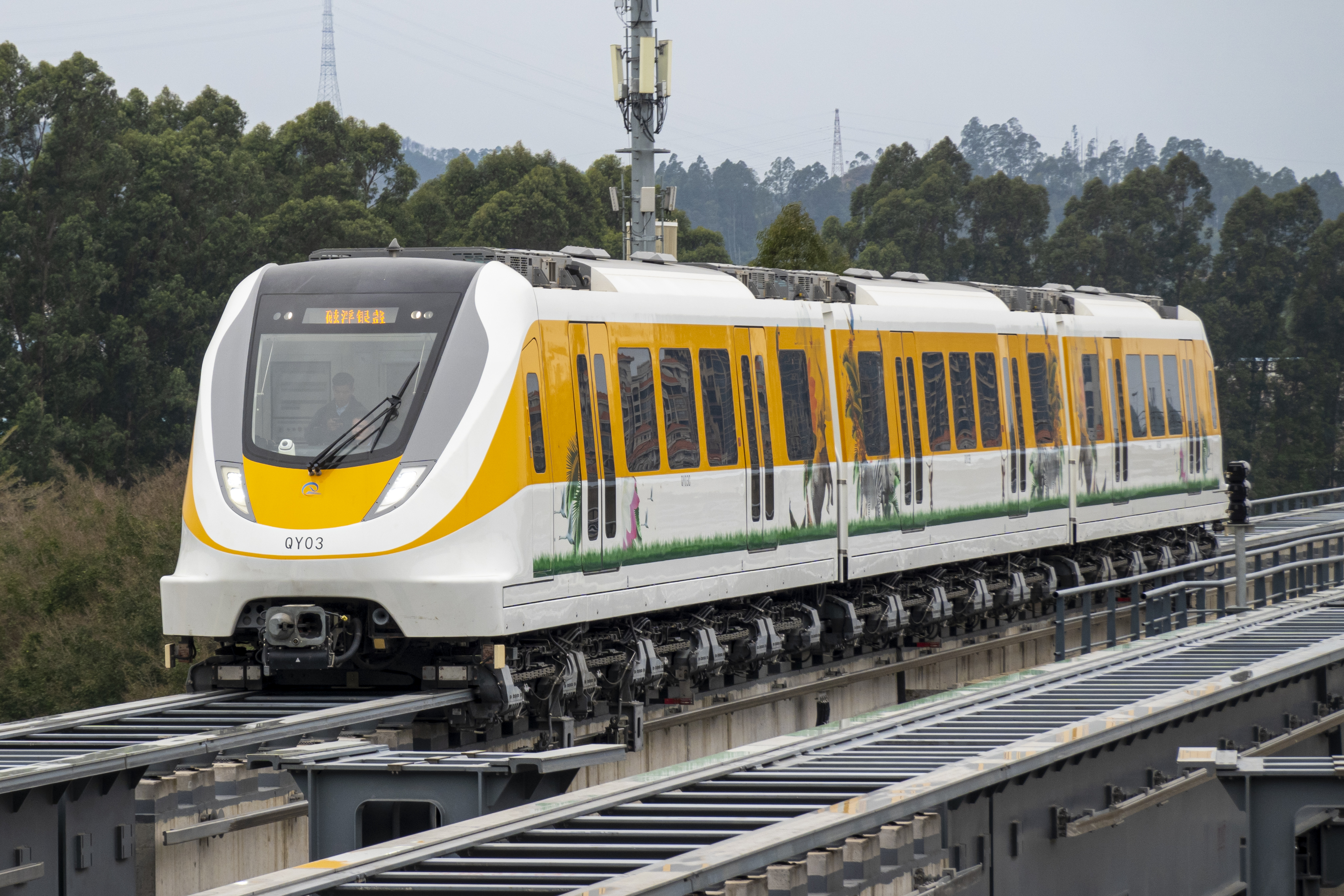
Qingyuan Maglev arriving at Maglev Yinzhan Station

Qingyuan Maglev Tourist Line (清远磁浮旅游专线) is a medium- to low-speed maglev line in Qingyuan, Guangdong province, China. The line will operate at speeds up to 100 kilometres per hour (62 mph). The first phase is 8.1 km with three stations (and one more future infill station). The first phase was originally scheduled to open in October 2020 and will connect the Yinzhan railway station on the Guangzhou–Qingyuan intercity railway with the Qingyuan Chimelong Theme Park. In the long term the line will be 38.5 km.

=== Maglevs under construction ===
==== Chūō Shinkansen (Japan) ====
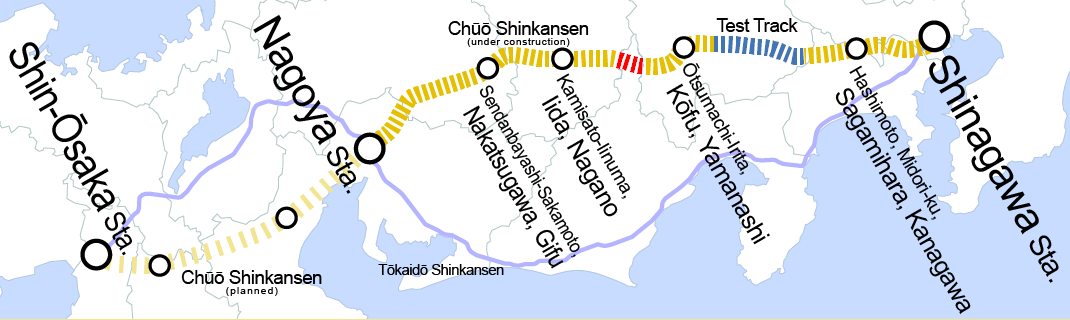
The Chūō Shinkansen route (bold yellow and red line) and existing Tōkaidō Shinkansen route (thin blue line)

The Chūō Shinkansen is a high-speed maglev line in Japan. Construction began in 2014, with commercial operations expected to start by 2027. The 2027 target was given up in July 2020 and will now open no earlier than 2035. The Linear Chuo Shinkansen Project aims to connect Tokyo and Osaka by way of Nagoya, the capital city of Aichi, in approximately one hour, less than half the travel time of the fastest existing bullet trains connecting the three metropolises. The full track between Tokyo and Osaka was originally expected to be completed in 2045, but the operator is now aiming for 2037.

The L0 Series train type is undergoing testing by the Central Japan Railway Company (JR Central) for eventual use on the Chūō Shinkansen line. It set a crewed world speed record of 603 kilometres per hour (375 mph) on 21 April 2015. The trains are planned to run at a maximum speed of 505 kilometres per hour (314 mph), offering journey times of 40 minutes between Tokyo (Shinagawa Station) and Nagoya, and 1 hour 7 minutes between Tokyo and Osaka (Shin-Ōsaka Station).

=== Test tracks ===
==== AMT test track – Powder Springs, Georgia, USA ====
A second prototype system in Powder Springs, Georgia, USA, was built by American Maglev Technology, Inc. The test track is 610 metres (2,000 ft) long with a 168.6 metres (553 ft) curve. Vehicles are operated up to 60 kilometres per hour (37 mph), below the proposed operational maximum of 97 kilometres per hour (60 mph). A June 2013 review of the technology called for an extensive testing program to ensure the system complies with various regulatory requirements, including the American Society of Civil Engineers (ASCE) People Mover Standard. The review noted that the test track is too short to assess the vehicles' dynamics at the maximum proposed speeds.

==== FTA's UMTD program, USA ====
In the US, the Federal Transit Administration (FTA) Urban Maglev Technology Demonstration program funded the design of several low-speed urban maglev demonstration projects. It assessed HSST for the Maryland Department of Transportation and maglev technology for the Colorado Department of Transportation. The FTA also funded work by General Atomics at California University of Pennsylvania to evaluate the MagneMotion M3 and the Maglev2000 superconducting EDS system of Florida. Another US urban maglev demonstration project of note is the Massachusetts-based Magplane.

==== San Diego, California, USA ====
General Atomics has a 120-metre (390 ft) test facility in San Diego, which is used to test Union Pacific's 8 kilometres (5 mi) freight shuttle in Los Angeles. The technology is "passive" (or "permanent"), using permanent magnets in a Halbach array for lift and requiring no electromagnets for either levitation or propulsion. General Atomics received US$90 million in research funding from the federal government. They are also considering their technology for high-speed passenger services.

==== SCMaglev, Yamanashi, Japan ====
Japan has a demonstration line in Yamanashi prefecture where a test train of the SCMaglev L0 Series Shinkansen reached 603 kilometres per hour (375 mph), faster than any wheeled train. The demonstration line will become part of the Chūō Shinkansen linking Tokyo and Nagoya, which is currently under construction.

These trains use superconducting magnets, which allow for a larger gap, and repulsive/attractive-type electrodynamic suspension (EDS). In comparison, Transrapid uses conventional electromagnets and attractive-type electromagnetic suspension (EMS).

On 15 November 2014, the Central Japan Railway Company ran eight days of testing for the experimental maglev Shinkansen train on its test track in Yamanashi Prefecture. One hundred passengers covered a 42.8-kilometre (26.6 mi) route between the cities of Uenohara and Fuefuki, reaching speeds of up to 500 kilometres per hour (310 mph).

==== Sengenthal, Germany and Chengdu, China ====
Transport System Bögl, a division of German construction company Max Bögl, has built a test track in Sengenthal, Bavaria, Germany. In appearance, it's more like the German M-Bahn than the Transrapid system. The vehicle tested on the track is patented in the US by Max Bögl. The company is also in a joint venture with a Chinese firm. A 3.5 km (2.2 mi) demonstration line has been built near Chengdu, China, and two vehicles were airlifted there in June 2000. In April 2021, a vehicle on the Chinese test track hit a top speed of 169 km/h (105 mph).

==== Southwest Jiaotong University, China ====
On 31 December 2000, the first crewed high-temperature superconducting maglev was tested successfully at Southwest Jiaotong University, Chengdu, China. This system is based on the principle that bulk high-temperature superconductors can be levitated stably above or below a permanent magnet. The load was over 530 kilograms (1,170 lb) and the levitation gap over 20 millimetres (0.79 in). The system uses liquid nitrogen to cool the superconductor.

==== Jiading Campus of Tongji University, China ====
A 1.5 km (0.93 mi) maglev test track has been operating since 2006 at the Jiading Campus of Tongji University, northwest of Shanghai. The track uses the same design as the Shanghai Maglev in operation. Top speed is restricted to 120 km/h (75 mph) due to the length of the track and its topology.

==== MagRail test track, Poland ====
In the first quarter of 2022, Polish technology startup Nevomo completed the construction of Europe's longest test track for passive magnetic levitation. The 700 metre-long railway track in Subcarpathian Voivodeship in Poland allows vehicles utilizing the company's MagRail system to travel at speeds of up to 160 km/h. The installation of all necessary wayside equipment was completed in December 2022 and tests began in spring 2023.

=== Defunct systems ===
==== Daejeon Expo Maglev (2008) ====
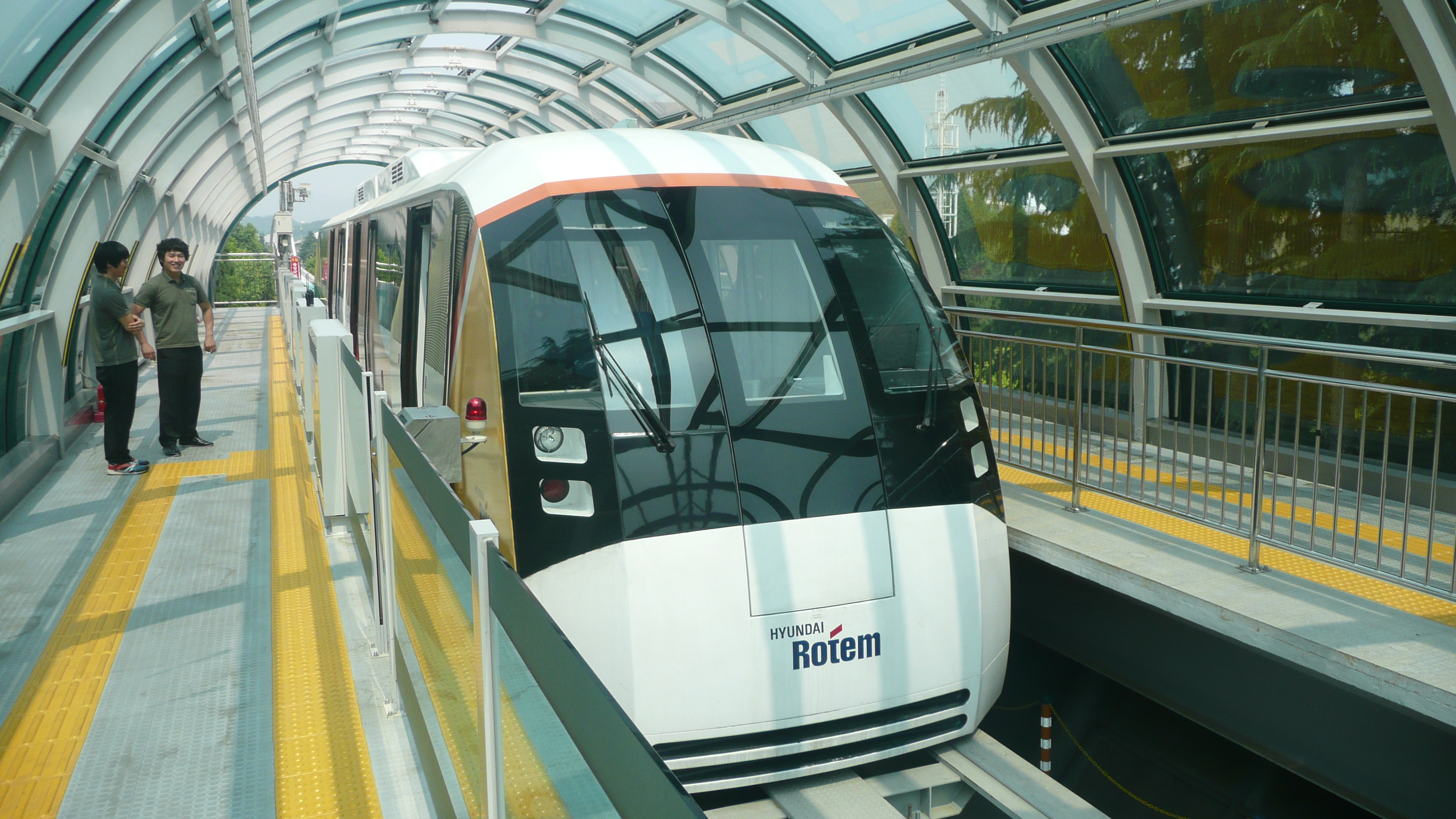
The rolling stock of the Daejeon Expo Maglev UTM-02

The first maglev test trials using electromagnetic suspension opened to public was HML-03, made by Hyundai Heavy Industries for the Daejeon Expo in 1993, after five years of research and manufacturing two prototypes, HML-01 and HML-02. Government research on urban maglev using electromagnetic suspension began in 1994. The first operating urban maglev was UTM-02 in Daejeon beginning on 21 April 2008, after 14 years of development and one prototype; UTM-01. The train runs on a 1 kilometre (0.6 mi) track between Expo Park and National Science Museum which has been shortened with the redevelopment of Expo Park. The track currently ends at the street parallel to the science museum. Meanwhile, UTM-02 conducted the world's first-ever maglev simulation. However, UTM-02 is still the second prototype of a final model. The final UTM model of Rotem's urban maglev, UTM-03, was used for a new line that opened in 2016 on Incheon's Yeongjong island connecting Incheon International Airport (see below). The Daejeon Expo Maglev ended service in 2020 and was demolished in 2021.

== Proposed maglev systems ==
Many maglev systems have been proposed in North America, Asia, Europe, and on the Moon. Many are in the early planning stages or were explicitly rejected.

=== China ===
==== Shanghai – Hangzhou ====
China planned to extend the existing Shanghai Maglev Train, initially by around 35 kilometres (22 mi) to Shanghai Hongqiao Airport and then 200 kilometres (120 mi) to the city of Hangzhou (Shanghai-Hangzhou Maglev Train). If built, this would be the first inter-city maglev rail line in commercial service.

The project was controversial and repeatedly delayed. In May 2007 the project was suspended by officials, reportedly due to public concerns about radiation from the system. In January and February 2008 hundreds of residents demonstrated in downtown Shanghai that the line route came too close to their homes, citing concerns about sickness due to exposure to the strong magnetic field, noise, pollution and devaluation of property near to the lines. Final approval to build the line was granted on 18 August 2008. Originally scheduled to be ready by Expo 2010, plans called for completion by 2014. The Shanghai municipal government considered multiple options, including building the line underground to allay public fears. This same report stated that the final decision had to be approved by the National Development and Reform Commission.

In 2007, the Shanghai municipal government was considering building a factory in Nanhui district to produce low-speed maglev trains for urban use.

==== Shanghai – Beijing ====
A proposed line would have connected Shanghai to Beijing, over a distance of 1,300 kilometres (800 mi), at an estimated cost of £15.5 billion. No projects had been revealed as of 2014.

=== Germany ===
On 25 September 2007, Bavaria announced a high-speed maglev-rail service from Munich to its airport. The Bavarian government signed contracts with Deutsche Bahn and Transrapid with Siemens and ThyssenKrupp for the €1.85 billion project.

On 27 March 2008, the German Transport minister announced that the project had been canceled due to rising construction costs. A new estimate put the project between €3.2–3.4 billion.

=== The Moon ===
The Flexible Levitation on a Track (FLOAT) project, announced by NASA, plans to build a maglev train on the Moon.

=== United Kingdom ===
==== London – Glasgow ====
A line was proposed in the United Kingdom from London to Glasgow with several route options through the Midlands, Northwest and Northeast of England. It was reported to be under favorable consideration by the government. The approach was rejected in the Government white paper Delivering a Sustainable Railway published on 24 July 2007. Another high-speed link was planned between Glasgow and Edinburgh but the technology remained unsettled.

=== United States ===
==== Washington, D.C. to New York City ====
Using Superconducting Maglev (SCMAGLEV) technology developed by the Central Japan Railway Company, the Northeast Maglev would ultimately connect major Northeast metropolitan hubs and airports traveling more than 500 kilometres per hour (311 miles per hour), with a goal of one-hour service between Washington, D.C. and New York City. As of 2019 the Federal Railroad Administration and Maryland Department of Transportation were preparing an Environmental Impact Statement (EIS) to evaluate the potential impacts of constructing and operating the system's first leg between Washington, DC and Baltimore, Maryland with an intermediate stop at BWI Airport.

==== California-Nevada Interstate Maglev ====
High-speed maglev lines between major cities of southern California and Las Vegas are under study via the California-Nevada Interstate Maglev Project. This plan was originally proposed as part of an I-5 or I-15 expansion plan. Still, the federal government ruled that it must be kept separate from interstate public works projects.

After the decision, private groups from Nevada proposed a line running from Las Vegas to Los Angeles, with stops in Primm, Nevada, Baker, California, and other points throughout San Bernardino County before reaching Los Angeles. Politicians expressed concern that a high-speed rail line out of state would carry spending out of state along with travelers.

== Incidents ==
Two incidents involved fires. A Japanese test train in Miyazaki, MLU002, was completely consumed by a fire in 1991.

On 11 August 2006, a fire broke out on the commercial Shanghai Transrapid shortly after arriving at the Longyang terminal. People were evacuated without incident before the vehicle was moved about 1 kilometre to keep smoke from filling the station. NAMTI officials toured the SMT maintenance facility in November 2010 and learned that the fire was caused by "thermal runaway" in a battery tray. As a result, SMT secured a new battery vendor, installed new temperature sensors and insulators, and redesigned the trays.

On 22 September 2006, a Transrapid train collided with a maintenance vehicle on a test/publicity run in Lathen (Lower Saxony / north-western Germany). Twenty-three people were killed and ten were injured; these were the first maglev crash fatalities. The accident was caused by human error. Charges were brought against three Transrapid employees after a year-long investigation.

Safety is a greater concern with high-speed public transport due to the potential for high-impact force and a large number of casualties. In the case of maglev trains as well as conventional high-speed rails, an incident could result from human error, including loss of power, or factors outside human control, such as ground movement caused by an earthquake.

== See also ==
- Bombardier Advanced Rapid Transit – transit systems using linear induction motors
- Electromagnetic suspension
- Ground-effect train
- Hyperloop
- Land speed record for rail vehicles
- Launch loop would be a maglev system for launching to orbit or escape velocity.
- Mass driver
- Nagahori Tsurumi-ryokuchi Line
- Oleg Tozoni worked on a published non-linearly stabilized maglev design.
- StarTram – a maglev launch system
- Transfer table
