= CPDL =

The acronym CPDL may refer to:

- Canadian Patents and Development Limited, a Canadian agency from 1947 to 1993
- Choral Public Domain Library, a sheet music archive which focuses on choral and vocal music
- Controller Pilot Data Link (also known as Controller Pilot Data Link Communications), a method of communication between an aircraft pilot and Air Traffic Control
