= Transport System Bögl =

German driverless maglev system

Transport System Bögl (TSB) is a maglev system for driverless trains developed by the German construction company Max Bögl since 2010. Its primary intended use is for short to medium distances (up to 30 kilometres (19 mi)) and speeds up to 150 kilometres per hour (93 mph) for uses such as airport shuttles. The company has been doing test runs on an 820 metres (2,690 ft) long test track at their headquarters in Sengenthal, Upper Palatinate, Germany since 2012, clocking over 100,000 tests covering a distance of over 65,000 kilometres (40,000 mi) as of 2018.

== Technical data ==
Technical data (per car where applicable)
capacity	up to 127 passengers
length	12 m
width	2.85 m
Empty weight	18 t
max. load	9.5 t
speed	150 km/h
maximum speed	169 km/h
acceleration	1.0 m/s²
deceleration	1.0 m/s²
maximum incline (percent)	10 %
Minimum curve radius	45 m
Maximum incline (arc degrees)	8°

== Chinese joint venture ==
In 2018, Max Bögl signed a joint venture agreement with the Chinese company Chengdu Xinzhu Road & Bridge Machinery Co. Ltd. to build a 3.5 km test track in Chengdu, China. The Chinese partner is to be given exclusive rights of production and marketing for the system in China. In 2020, the first cars intended for use on the Chinese test track were carried by truck to Munich Airport and then flown by an Antonov An-124 cargo plane to their destination for a planned entry into test-service later that year.

== Proposals for use ==
In February 2020, the German Ministry of Transportation announced a feasibility study for the use of TSB at Munich Airport. In June 2020, the CDU Berlin (then in opposition at the state level) proposed to build a line of the TSB to Berlin Brandenburg Airport citing alleged cost benefits as compared to an extension of the Berlin U-Bahn.

In November 2023, the CDU Berlin announced plans for the construction of a TSB line in the city centre.
