= Sengenthal =

- Municipality
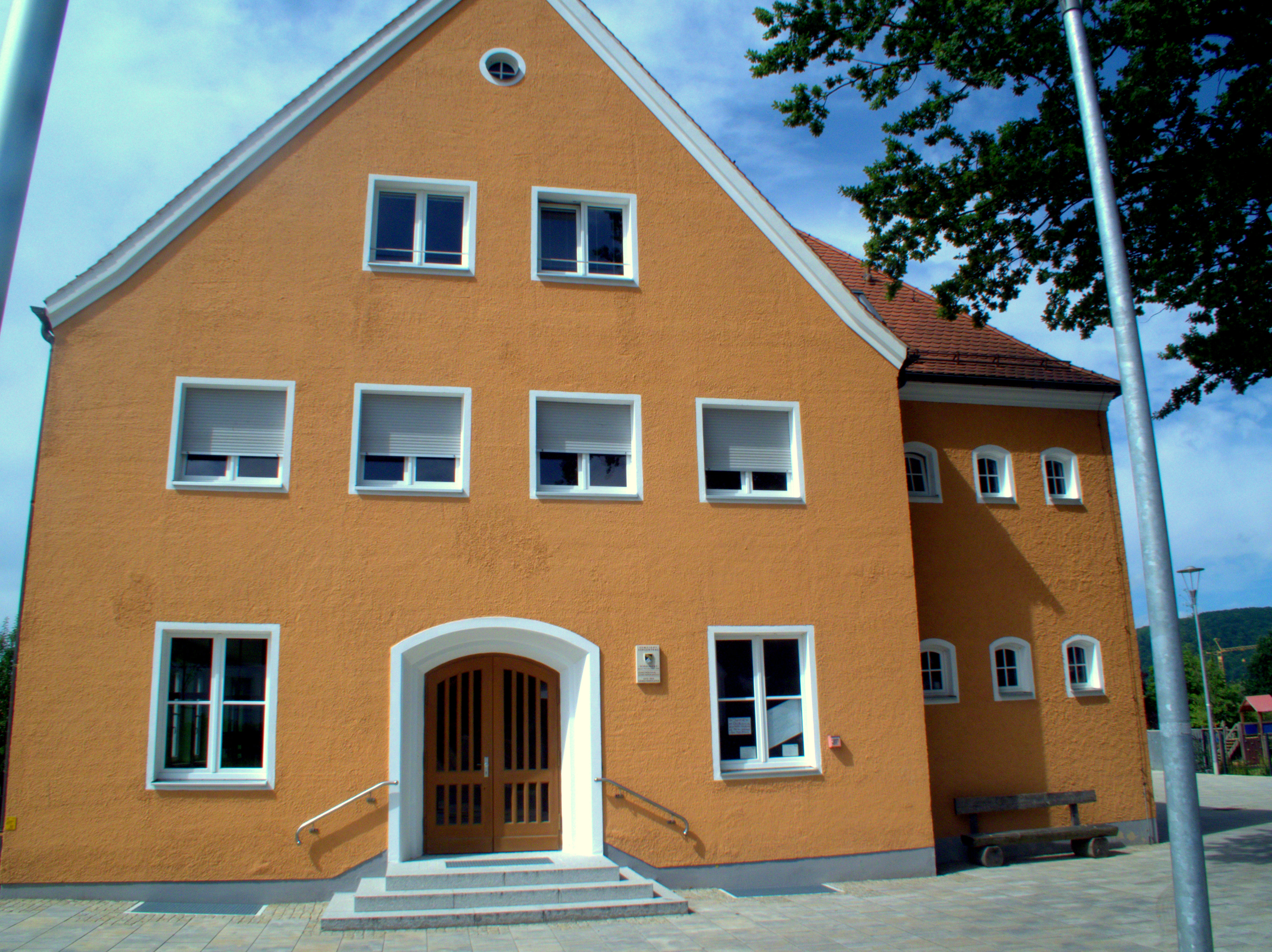
- Town hall

- Coat of arms

- Location of Sengenthal within Neumarkt in der Oberpfalz district
- Interactive map of Sengenthal
- Location within Germany Location within Bavaria
- Coordinates: 49°14′N 11°28′E
- Country: Germany
- State: Bavaria
- Admin. region: Oberpfalz
- District: Neumarkt in der Oberpfalz
- Municipal assoc.: Neumarkt in der Oberpfalz

Government
  - Mayor (2020–26): Werner Brandenburger

Area
  - Total: 28.53 km^{2} (11.02 sq mi)
- Elevation: 434 m (1,424 ft)

Population (2025-12-31)
  - Total: 4,114
  - Density: 144.2/km^{2} (373.5/sq mi)
- Time zone: UTC+01:00 (CET)
  - Summer (DST): UTC+02:00 (CEST)
- Postal codes: 92369
- Dialling codes: 09181
- Vehicle registration: NM
- Website: www.sengenthal.de

Sengenthal is a municipality in the district of Neumarkt in Bavaria in Germany.

== Local economy ==
Sengenthal is the headquarters of the construction company Max Bögl the developer of Transport System Bögl who also have a testing site in Sengenthal for their maglev system.
