= Oleg Tozoni =

Oleg V. Tozoni
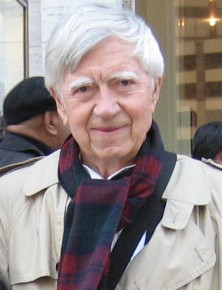
- Oleg Tozoni
- Born: 3 January 1927; Qyzylorda, Kazakh SSR, USSR
- Died: 1 June 2012 (aged 85); Rockville, Maryland, United States
- Citizenship: USA
- Education: Novocherkassk Polytechnic Institute, Kiev Polytechnic Institute
- Known for: AMLEV MDS Maglev System
- Scientific career
- Fields: Electrical engineering, mathematics
- Workplaces: University of Maryland

Oleg V. Tozoni was a scientist, inventor, and a specialist in the field of electro-dynamic and electrical engineering. Since 1964 through 1988 Tozoni was the Head of the Department of Electrodynamics at the Cybernetics Institute of the Academy of Science, USSR. After immigration to the U.S. in 1989, Tozoni worked as a Visiting research professor at the University of Maryland, Department of Electrical Engineering. He resided in Maryland and continued to work developing his MDS maglev system until his death. His work continues to be developed by TozoniMAGLEV, L.L.C.

Tozoni died on 1 June 2012, age 85, from cancer.

== Education and professional activities ==
Tozoni received a M.S. and PhD in Electrical Engineering from Novocherkassk Polytechnical Institute in 1951, and 1958 respectively, and Doctor of Science (a Post Doctoral degree) in Electrical Engineering from Kiev Polytechnical Institute in 1965. He was a member of editorial board of COMPEL – International Journal for Computation and Mathematics in Electrical and Electronic Engineering and Consultant to the Science Application Institute of Electronics, Warsaw, Poland from 1985 to 1988. Prior to emigration from the USSR, in 1989, Tozoni was also a member of Editorial Boards of publications of the USSR Academy of Science: Teoreticheskaya electrotekhnika and Electromekhanika.

== Works ==
=== Published scientific books ===
- "Mathematical Models for The Evaluation of Electric and Magnetic Fields", 238 p., Gordon & Breach, New York, 1970.
- "Poly-phase Industrial Power Buses" (with T.J. Kolerova), 368 p., Naukova Dumka, Kiev, USSR, (UK), 1966.
- "Evaluation of Electromagnetic Fields by Computers", 252 p., Technika, Kiev, USSR (UK), 1967.
- "Computation of 3‑Dimensional Electromagnetic Fields" (With I.Mayergoyz), 352 p., Technika, Kiev, USSR, 1974.
- "Method of Secondary Sources in Electrical Engineering", 296 p., Energy, Moscow, USSR, 1975.

=== Self published sociology books ===
- "Can Democracy Overcome Tyranny (Сможет ли Демократия Победить Тиранию)", 171 p., Gstanislav Company, Inc., New York, 2004.

=== Scientific publications ===
- Oleg V. Tozoni, "Gas gun accelerator based on passive magnetodynamic suspension", IEЕЕ Transactions on Magnetics., vol. 40, no 3, May 2004.
- "Amlev – Self-regulating Version of Maglev", submitted in IEEE Transactions on Magnetic, 2001.
- "Designing a Magneto-dynamic Stable Suspension System", IEEE Transactions on Magnetics, vol.35, No.5, pp. 4268–4274, September 1999.
- "Self-regulating Permanent Magnet Linear Motor", IEEE Transactions on Magnetics., vol. 35, no 4, pp. 2137–2145 July 1999.
- "New Stable Magneto-dynamic Suspension system", IEEE Transactions on Magnetics., vol. 35, no 2 pp . 1047–1054‚ March 1999.
- "On Creating an Information Base for CAD and Analysis of Electrical Devices", Electricity, USSR, no.7, 1–11, July 1988.
- "The Linear Induction Motor Stator Gap Primary Magnetic Field", (with M.E. Mamedshakhov, M. M.Nezhinskaya, N.S. Nikolaeva), Electrical Engineering, USSR no 4, 60–77, 1986.
