= Max Bögl =

Multinational construction company

- Type: Stiftung & Co. KG
- Industry: Construction
- Founded: 1929
- Headquarters: Sengenthal, Germany
- Key people: Stefan Bögl (CEO)
- Products: building construction, traffic routes construction, civil engineering, tunnel construction, structural steel and plant construction, supply and waste disposal, prefabricated components
- Revenue: €1.7 billion (2017)
- Number of employees: 6,500 (2017)
- Website: www.max-boegl.de

Max Bögl is a German multinational major construction company based in Sengenthal, Germany.

== History ==
On 8 August 2008, a bridge renovated by the Czech subsidiary BÖGL a KRÝSL k.s. collapsed in Studénka. The debris fell onto the Eurocity railway line from Krakow to Prague which the EuroCity 102 Comenius train crashed into. As a result, eight people died and 97 were injured. The Studenka train disaster was the worst in Czech history. The legal dispute over responsibility for the bridge collapse ended in 2017 with the acquittal due to lack of evidence of all of the accused.

During 2010, the company took the lead in the acquisition work for the Transrapid, and in the same year, it won contracts for the expansion of the Miejski Stadium (Wrocław), the extension of the runway of the Sibiu Airport, the new construction of the Arena Națională in Bucharest, and the construction of the bypass expressway around Sibiu. In 2011, Bavaria's most powerful wind turbine was commissioned on Winnberg in the district of Neumarkt in der Oberpfalz (total height 180 m (590 ft), connection power 3.4 MW (4,600 hp)).

In 2018, Max Bögl signed a joint venture with the Chinese company Chengdu Xinzhu Road & Bridge Machinery Co. Ltd. to build a 3.5 km (2.2 mi) Maglev test track in Chengdu, China. The Chinese partner has been given exclusive rights of production and marketing for the system in China. Two years later, the first cars destined for the Chinese test track were carried by truck to Munich Airport and then flown by Antonov An-124 cargo plane to their destination for a planned entry into test-service later that year. In February 2021, a vehicle on the Chinese test track reached a top speed of 169 km/h (105 mph).

== Projects ==
The company has carried out several major projects in transport infrastructure, civil engineering and sport venues. It has also patented a new hybrid turbine wind tower. The company also developed the Transport System Bögl technology, a new kind of Maglev for medium speeds (up to 150 km/h (93 mph)) and distances of up to 50 km (31 mi).

=== List ===
==== Germany ====
- Munich, Stuttgart and Hamburg airports (new terminals)
- parts of the Rhine–Main–Danube Canal
- Cologne–Rhine/Main and Nuremberg–Ingolstadt ICE railway lines
- EuroSpeedway Lausitz race track
- Commerzbank Arena in Frankfurt (upgrade)
- Höfe am Brühl, shopping mall in Leipzig
- BayArena in Leverkusen (renovated)
- Arena Nürnberger Versicherung
- Arena Ulm/Neu-Ulm
- Bundesautobahn 6 sector between Roth and Nuremberg

==== Croatia ====
- Varaždin Arena

==== Poland ====
- Stadion Miejski in Wrocław

==== Romania ====
- National Arena in Bucharest
- Sibiu Airport land strip
- A1 motorway segments Sibiu bypass and Arad – Nădlac (both in a joint venture with Astaldi)
- A2 motorway segment between Drajna and Feteşti, and the sector between Cernavodă and Constanţa (both in a joint venture with Astaldi)
- A3 motorway segment between Iernut and Cheţani - currently under construction (in a joint venture with Astaldi)

==== United Arab Emirates ====
- Al Maktoum International Airport in Dubai
