= Nevomo =

Polish railway technology company

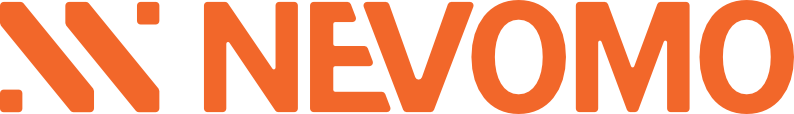
- Formerly: Hyper Poland
- Industry: Railway Technology
- Founded: April 21, 2017; 7 years ago in Warsaw, Poland
- Headquarters: Warsaw, Poland
- Products: MagRail
- Number of employees: 53 (2023)
- Website: www.nevomo.tech

Nevomo (known as Hyper Poland until 2020) is a Polish transportation start-up founded in 2017. The company proposes a Maglev-based transportation system which can be retrofitted to existing railway tracks, and future work on a Hyperloop system.

== History ==
Nevomo was founded in April 2017 under its original name Hyper Poland as a spin-off of a team of university students of Warsaw University of Technology. The student team had successfully participated in the Hyperloop Pod Competition II competition organized by SpaceX in California. By the end of 2018, the company had filed eight patent applications. In October 2019, the company unveiled its first 1:5 scale prototype of the track and MagRail vehicle. In 2020, the company begun test runs on a scaled-down track. In the same year, the company rebranded from Hyper Poland to Nevomo.

In the first quarter of 2022, Nevomo completed the construction of Europe's longest test track for passive magnetic levitation. The 700 meter-long railway track in Subcarpathian Voivodeship in Poland allows vehicles utilizing the company's MagRail technology to travel at speeds of up to 160 kph. The installation of all necessary wayside equipment was completed in December 2022 and tests began in spring 2023. The first levitation tests were planned for 2023.

== Technology ==
Nevomo is developing a proprietary transport system similar to Maglev, which can be retrofitted onto existing rail infrastructure. The company's core technological focus areas are in the development of a new type of linear motor, the levitation and guidance systems, the power electronics and position control systems, as well as monitoring systems. The company anticipates that a railway track will be first upgraded with the company's MagRail technology, which in a later stage is first enclosed to reduce drag, before finally becoming a full-fledged Hyperloop with a vacuum tube. As the later stages are expected to demand many more years of development before becoming technically and commercially viable, Nevomo is currently focusing on a "MagRail Booster" system intended to magnetically propel existing retrofitted rolling stock, and a full "Levitating MagRail" system which implements Maglev by retrofitting existing train tracks.

== Funding ==
The company has secured a grant of PLN 16.5 million from the National Center for Research and Development (NCBiR) and completed two rounds of equity crowdfunding campaigns on Seedrs with PLN 3.7 million. In 2020, the Hütter Private Equity fund from Gdynia, Poland joined the company's investor group.

In mid-2022 Nevomo received funding of €2.5 million from the European Innovation Council (EIC) accelerator program, to be expanded with a campaign component of up to €15 million from the EIC fund. In the same year, EIT InnoEnergy - one of the world's largest investors in sustainable energy innovation - also invested in the company.
