= Inductrack =

Passive, fail-safe electrodynamic magnetic levitation system

Inductrack is a passive, fail-safe electrodynamic magnetic levitation system, using only unpowered loops of wire in the track and permanent magnets (arranged into Halbach arrays) on the vehicle to achieve magnetic levitation. The track can be in one of two configurations, a "ladder track" and a "laminated track". The ladder track is made of unpowered Litz wire cables, and the laminated track is made out of stacked copper or aluminium sheets.

There are three designs: Inductrack I, which is optimized for high-speed operation, Inductrack II, which is more efficient at lower speeds, and Inductrack III, which is intended for heavy loads at low speed.

Inductrack (or Inductrak) was invented by a team of scientists at Lawrence Livermore National Laboratory in California, headed by physicist Richard F. Post, for use in maglev trains, based on technology used to levitate flywheels. At constant velocity, power is required only to push the train forward against air and electromagnetic drag. Above a minimum speed, as the velocity of the train increases, the levitation gap, lift force and power used are largely constant. The system can lift 50 times the magnet weight.

== Description ==
Magnetic levitation using a planar Halbach array and concentric structure windings

The name inductrack comes from the word inductance or inductor; an electrical device made from loops of wire. As a Halbach magnet array passes over the loops of wire, the sinusoidal variations in the field induce a voltage in the track coils. At low speeds, the loops are a largely resistive impedance, and hence the induced currents are highest where the field is changing most quickly, which is around the least intense parts of the field, thus little lift is produced.

However, at speed, the impedance of the coils increases, proportionate to speed, and dominates the composite impedance of the coil assemblies. This delays the phase of the current peak so that induced current in the track tends more closely to coincide with the field peaks of the magnet array. The track thus creates its own magnetic field which lines up with and repels the permanent magnets, creating the levitation effect. The track is well modeled as an array of series RL circuits.

When neodymium–iron–boron permanent magnets are used, levitation is achieved at low speeds. The test model levitated at speeds above 22 mph (35 km/h), but Richard Post believes that, on real tracks, levitation could be achieved at "as little as 1 to 2 mph (1.6 to 3.2 km/h)". Below the transition speed the magnetic drag increases with vehicle speed; above the transition speed, the magnetic drag decreases with speed. For example, at 500 km/h (310 mph) the lift to drag ratio is 200:1, far higher than any aircraft but much lower than classic steel on steel rail which reaches 1000:1 (rolling resistance). This occurs because the inductive impedance increases proportionately with speed which compensates for the faster rate of change of the field seen by the coils, thus giving a constant current flow and power consumption for the levitation.

The Inductrack II variation uses two Halbach arrays, one above and one below the track, to double the magnetic field without substantially increasing the weight or area of the arrays, while also reducing drag at low speeds.

Several maglev railroad proposals are based upon Inductrack technology. The U.S. National Aeronautics and Space Administration (NASA) is also considering Inductrack technology for launching space planes.

General Atomics is developing Inductrack technology in cooperation with multiple research partners.

=== Evolution of InducTrack ===
Depending the application, lift to drag ratio at low speed or higher speed are favored. The three variation of the Inductrack are designed for different purposes. The Inductrack I was designed for high-speed trains. The lift-to-drag ratio lowers while speed increases. The Inductrack II has more capabilities of levitation at relatively low speed for use in individual (PRT) or urban transport and uses a cantilevered track. The InducTrack III is designed for high load and cargo with track only partly cantilevered to sustain high loads.

=== Damping ===
There is no active damping and the damping is only provided by the geometry of the track. Tests have shown that low-frequency oscillations (1 Hz) occur and a US patent for mechanically damping the track itself (on Inductrack II) was issued (7478598). The track is cut in segments and each segment is mechanically dampened.
