= Canadian Patents and Development Limited =

Canadian Patents and Development Limited (CPDL) was a Canadian agency tasked with promoting the commercialization of inventions and discoveries arising from government departments and agencies, as well as those disclosed to it by universities and others publicly funded organizations. The National Research Council of Canada (NRC) founded CPDL on October 24, 1947, as a subsidiary Crown Corporation under part 1 of the Canadian Companies Act (now Canadian Corporations Act). As a subsidiary of the NRC, CPDL was charged with handling the assessment, patenting, development, and licensing of the intellectual property developed by the scientific workers of the NRC. Soon after its incorporation, CPDL began making its services available to Canadian universities and other publicly financed organizations. The number of Canadian agencies and departments reporting inventions to CPDL increased substantially in 1954 with the enactment of the Public Servants' Inventions Act, which made CPDL eligible to accept and manage the inventions arising from all federal departments and agencies. Despite its broad mandate and many agreements, CPDL was noted by university administrators as possessing inadequate resources to effectively manage inventions for all of Canada's universities, while the industry consensus "was that CPDL's work was under-publicized, under-supported, undersold and under-followed-up." On February 20, 1990, the Minister of Finance announced the planned dissolution of CPDL as part of a larger government commitment to reducing the size of government and improving the efficiency of public services. A few months later, the Crown Corporation Dissolution or Transfer Authorization Bill (Bill C-73) was introduced to parliament to facilitate the closure of several crown corporations and the transfer of their responsibilities. The bill authorized the Minister of Industry, Science, and Technology to dissolve CPDL, and made government departments and agencies responsible for managing their own intellectual property. Following the Crown Corporation Dissolution or Transfer Authorization Bill, all CPDL agreements with Canadian universities were terminated, and all patented faculty inventions held by CPDL were transferred back to each respective university. On August 1, 1993 CPDL ceased all operations.
