= List of speed records in rail transport =

This article provides an overview of speed records in rail transport. It is divided into absolute records for rail vehicles and fastest connections in the timetable.

== Current speed records ==
An L0 Series trainset, holding the non-conventional train world speed record of 603 km/h (375 mph)

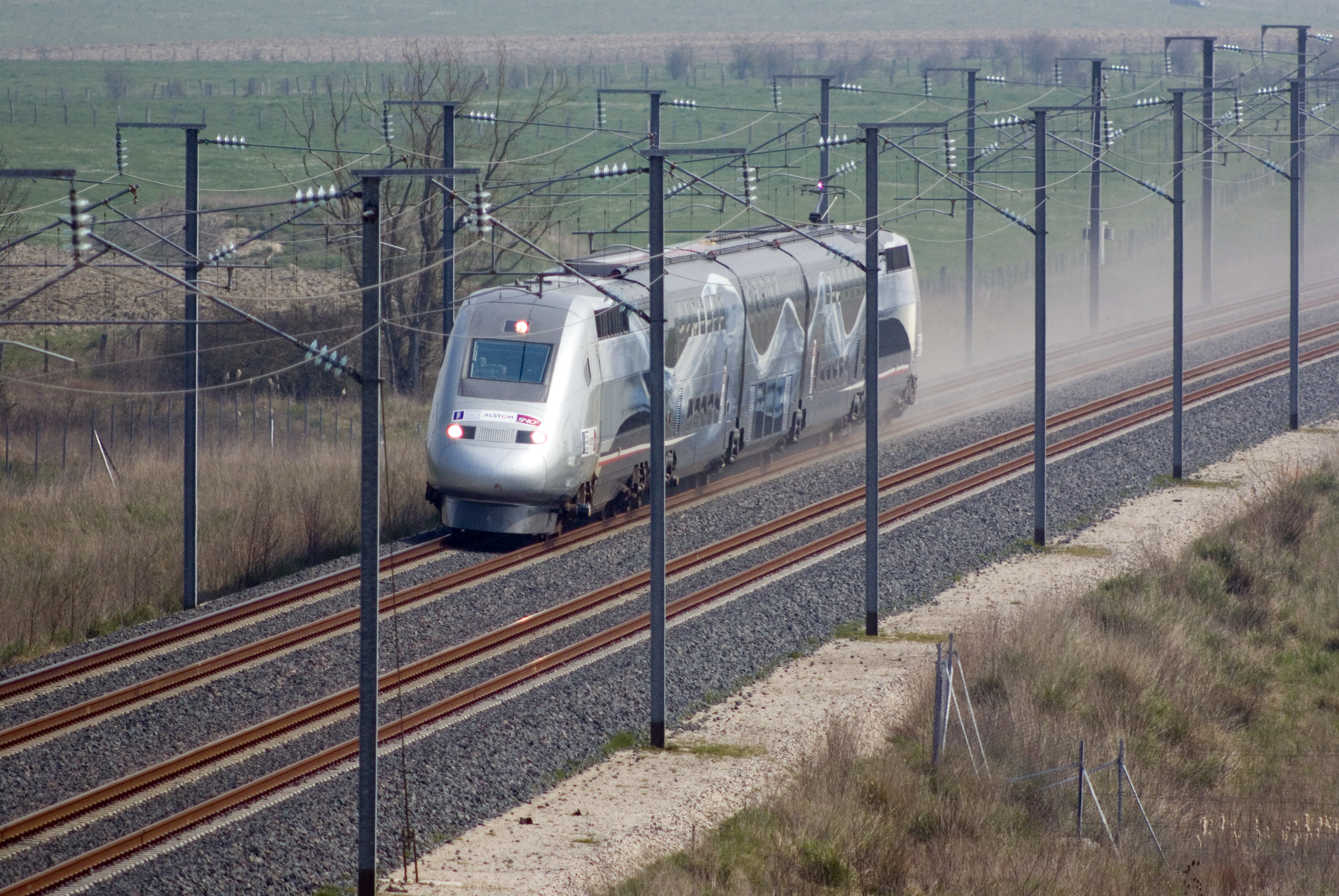
TGV 4402 (operation V150) reaching 574.8 km/h (357 mph)

The world record for a conventional wheeled passenger train is held by a modified French TGV high-speed (with standard equipment) code named V150, set in 2007 when it reached 574.8 km/h (357.2 mph) on a 140 km (87 mi) long section of LGV Est line, part of the Trans-European high-speed rail network. Japan's experimental maglev train L0 Series achieved 603 km/h (375 mph) on a 42.8 km (26.6 mi) magnetic levitation track in 2015.

Under commercial traffic and practical conditions where trains carry passengers across from one station to another, the world records for top operating speeds of maglev and single-phase trains are held respectively by China's Shanghai maglev train with a top speed of 431 km/h (268 mph) and CR400 Fuxing Hao at 350 km/h (220 mph). They are followed by France's TGV Duplex, Japan's E5 Series Shinkansen and the German ICE 3 (when operating in France) which all have maximum operating speeds of 320 km/h (200 mph) for commercial services.

== Past world speed records ==
Legend:

Arr (Arrangement)
Disposition and number of elements forming the train.

Loc
One locomotive pulling one or more cars.
Multi
Multiple motorized elements on a single train.
Single
Single rail vehicle (i.e. railbus)

Power
DC, DC 3rd rail, AC, Single phase, Triphase, Diesel-elec., Gas, Steam, Diesel-hydraulic, Propeller, Rocket, Jet
State
- "Proto." (Prototype)
- "Unmod." (Unmodified from vehicles in service)
- "Tuned" (Modified at some level for a better performance)
- "Unknown"

=== All passenger trains ===
The following is a partial list of absolute world speed records for all trains designed to carry passengers, regardless of gauge, propulsion or type of rail.

Speed	Date	Line	Country	Train	Arr	Power	State	Comments
603 km/h (375 mph)	2015-04-21	Yamanashi Test Track	Japan	L0 Series	Multi	AC (Maglev)	Proto.	Seven-car train set, manned
590 km/h (367 mph)	2015-04-16	Yamanashi Test Track	Japan	L0 Series	Multi	AC (Maglev)	Proto.	Seven-car train set, manned
581 km/h (361 mph)	2003-12-02	Yamanashi Test Track	Japan	MLX01	Multi	AC (Maglev)	Proto.	Three-car train set. Guinness Book of Records authenticated.
574.8 km/h (357 mph)	2007-04-03	LGV Est	France	SNCF TGV POS Set No. 4402	Multi	AC	Tuned	Extensive modifications. Set formed of 5 cars. Current world record on steel rails.
568 km/h (353 mph)	2007-04-01	LGV Est	France	SNCF TGV POS Set No. 4402	Multi	AC	Tuned	Set formed of 5 cars.
515.3 km/h (320 mph)	1990-05-18	LGV Atlantique	France	SNCF TGV Atlantique Set No. 325	Multi	AC	Tuned	Extensive modifications. Set formed of 5 cars. Definitive record for TGV No. 325.
510.6 km/h (317 mph)	1990-05-09	LGV Atlantique	France	SNCF TGV Atlantique Set No. 325	Multi	AC	Tuned	Extensive modifications. Set formed of 5 cars. First attempt for TGV No. 325.
501 km/h (311 mph)	2003-11-12	Shanghai Maglev Train	China	Transrapid SMT	Multi	AC (Maglev)	Unmod.	Recorded in 2003 at a test run before the commercial operation in 2004
487.3 km/h (303 mph)	2011-01-10	Beijing–Shanghai HSR	China	CRH380BL	Multi	Single phase	Tuned	12-car trainset
486.1 km/h (302 mph)	2010-12-03	Beijing–Shanghai HSR	China	CRH380AL	Multi	Single phase	Tuned	16-car trainset, near Sùzhōu
482.4 km/h (300 mph)	1990-12-05	LGV Atlantique	France	SNCF TGV Atlantique Set No. 325	Multi	AC	Tuned	Extensive modifications.
453.0 km/h (281.5 mph)	2023-06-28	Fuzhou-Xiamen HSR	China	CR400AF-J-0002	Multi	AC	Proto	8-car train with parts for CR450
443.0 km/h (275 mph)	1996-07-26	Tokaido Shinkansen	Japan	Class 955 (300X)	Multi	AC	Proto.	
425.0 km/h (264 mph)	1993-12-21	Jōetsu Shinkansen	Japan	Class 952/953 (STAR21)	Multi	AC	Proto.	
421.4 km/h (262 mph)	2013-03-28	Gyeongbu high-speed railway	South Korea	Hyundai Rotem HEMU-430X	Multi	AC	Proto	six-car train set, maximum speed test
411.5 km/h (256 mph)	1974-08-14	High Speed Ground Test Center	United States	LIMRV	Loc	Gas turbine	Proto	
408.4 km/h (254 mph)	1988	LGV Sud-Est	France	SNCF TGV Sud-Est Set No. 88	Multi	AC		
406.9 km/h (253 mph)	1988-05-01	Hanover–Würzburg high-speed railway	Germany	Intercity Experimental (ICE V)	Multi	AC	Proto	The first time that a railway vehicle broke the 400 km/h mark. The official world record was beaten just one year later by the French TGV.
380 km/h (236 mph)	2007-04-03	LGV Est	France	SNCF TGV POS Set No. 4404	Multi	AC	unmod	Set formed of 10 cars -The 4404 train opens the way at 380 km/h for record breaker Tgv 4402 V150 train.
362 km/h (225 mph)	2009-02-04	Monte Bibele tunnel (Bologna-Firenze HSL)	Italy	ETR 500-Y	Multi	AC	Tuned	World record in tunnel.
350.4 km/h (218 mph)	1992-08-08	Sanyo Shinkansen	Japan	500-900 Series (WIN350)	Multi	AC	Proto.	
334.7 km/h (208 mph)	2003-07-30	High Speed 1	United Kingdom	Alstom Eurostar Tgv 3313/4, British Rail Class 373	Multi	AC	Unmod	The speed of 334.7 km/h was recorded at Nashenden Valley, just outside Rochester.
331 km/h (206 mph)	1955-03-29	"Les Landes", between Bordeaux and Dax	France	Jeumont-Schneider SNCF BB 9003-9004	Loc	DC	Tuned	Pulling 3 cars. Train was specially modified for the test. The track was badly damaged by the test.
319.0 km/h (198 mph)	1979-12-07	Oyama Test Track (later part of the Tōhoku Shinkansen)	Japan	Class 961	Multi	AC	Proto.	
318 km/h (198 mph)	1974-12-08	"Les Landes", between Bordeaux and Dax	France	TGV001	Multi	AC	proto	TGV first prototype
303 km/h (188 mph)	2007-09-14	Ankara-Istanbul high-speed railway between Ankara and Eskişehir.	Turkey	ETR 500 Y2	Multi	AC	Unmod.	Turkish railway speed record. Record set during testing of the high-speed railway, 18 months before revenue service began.
243 km/h (151 mph)	1954-02-21		France	SNCF CC 7107	Loc	DC	unmod	
271 km/h (168 mph)	1993-10-05	Saint Petersburg — Moscow	Russia	TEP80	Loc	Diesel-elec	Proto.	Claimed, but no verification from an independent witness
256 km/h (159 mph)	2002-06-12, 2002-07-10	Madrid - Barcelona, Olmedo-Medina del Campo	Spain	Talgo XXI	Multi	Diesel-elec	Proto.	Claimed by the company for both dates.
238 km/h (148 mph)	1987-11-01	East Coast Main Line	United Kingdom	Class 43 (HST)	Multi	Diesel-elec	Modified	Current official diesel speed record listed in 2006 Guinness Book of Records
230.4 km/h (143 mph)	1973-06-12	East Coast Main Line	United Kingdom	HST prototype	Multi	Diesel-elec	Proto.	
205 km/h (127 mph)	1936-02-17		Germany	DRG SVT 137 233-234 "Bauart Leipzig"	Multi	Diesel-elec	Unmod.	First diesel train faster than 200 km/h (124 mph)
202.58 km/h (126 mph)	1938-03-07	East Coast Main Line between Peterborough and Grantham	United Kingdom	LNER Class A4 4468 Mallard	Loc	Steam	Unmod.	Authenticated speed. World Steam Speed Record Holder to this day. Analysis of the original dynamometer rolls in 2018 however points to several issues with the original authentication and a sustained maximum speed of 199.36 km/h (124 mph).
166.6 km/h (104 mph)	1934-07-20		United States	Milwaukee Road class F6 #6402	Loc	Steam	Unmod	A point between Oakwood, Illinois and Lake, Wisconsin. Also averaged 75.5 mph (122 km/h) on 85 miles (137 km) from Chicago, Illinois to Milwaukee, and 89.92 mph (145 km/h) for a 68.9 miles (110.9 km) stretch
161 km/h (100 mph)	1934-11-30	East Coast Main Line	United Kingdom	LNER Class A3 4472 Flying Scotsman	Loc	Steam	Unmod.	In 1934, Flying Scotsman achieved the first authenticated 100 mph (161 km/h) by a steam locomotive.
48 km/h (30 mph)	1829	Rainhill Trials	United Kingdom	Stephenson's Rocket	Loc	Steam	Unmod.	

=== Conventional wheeled ===
The following is a list of verified absolute world speed records for conventional wheeled rail vehicles.

Speed	Date	Line	Country	Train	Arr.	Power	State	Comments
574.8 km/h (357 mph)	2007-04-03	LGV Est	France	SNCF TGV POS Set No. 4402	Multi	AC	Tuned	Set formed of 2 power cars + 3 trailers. Current world record on steel rails.
515.3 km/h (320 mph)	1990-05-18	LGV Atlantique	France	SNCF TGV Atlantique Set No. 325	Multi	AC	Tuned	Extensive modifications.
487.3 km/h (303 mph)	2010-12-03	Beijing–Shanghai HSR	China	CRH380BL	Multi	Single phase	Unmod.	16-car trainset
486.1 km/h (302 mph)	2010-12-03	Beijing–Shanghai HSR	China	CRH380AL	Multi	Single phase	Unmod.	16-car trainset, near Sùzhōu
482.4 km/h (300 mph)	1989-12-05	LGV Atlantique	France	SNCF TGV Atlantique Set No. 325	Multi	AC	Tuned	Extensive modifications.
421.4 km/h (262 mph)	2013-03-28	Gyeongbu high-speed railway	South Korea	Hyundai Rotem HEMU-430X	Multi	AC	Proto	
406.9 km/h (253 mph)	1988-05-01	Hanover–Würzburg high-speed railway	Germany	Intercity Experimental (ICE V)	Multi	AC	Proto	The first time that a railway vehicle broke the 400 km/h mark. The record was beaten just one year later by the French TGV.
380 km/h (236 mph)	1981-02-26	LGV Sud-Est	France	SNCF TGV Sud-Est Set No. 16	Multi	AC	Tuned	Line voltage increased from 25 kV to 29 kV, wheels of a larger diameter, and gear ratios between motors and wheels increased.
352.4 km/h (219 mph)	2004-12-16	Gyeongbu high-speed railway	South Korea	Hyundai Rotem HSR-350x	Multi	AC	Proto	
334.7 km/h (208 mph)	2003-07-30	High Speed 1	United Kingdom	Eurostar 3313/4, British Rail Class 373	Multi	AC	Unmod	The speed of 334.7 km/h was recorded at Nashenden Valley, just outside Rochester.
331 km/h (206 mph)	1955-03-29	"Les Landes", between Bordeaux and Dax	France	Jeumont-Schneider SNCF BB 9003-9004	Loc	DC	Tuned	Pulling 3 cars. Train was specially modified for the test. The track was badly damaged by the test.
271 km/h (168 mph)	1993-10-05	Saint Petersburg — Moscow	Russia	TEP80	Loc	Diesel-elec	Proto.	Claimed, but no verification from an independent witness
238 km/h (148 mph)	1987-11-01	East Coast Main Line	United Kingdom	Class 43 (HST)	Multi	Diesel-elec	Modified	Current official diesel speed record listed in 2006 Guinness Book of Records
230.4 km/h (143 mph)	1973-06-12	East Coast Main Line	United Kingdom	HST prototype	Multi	Diesel-elec	Proto.	
205 km/h (127 mph)	1936-02-17		Germany	DRG SVT 137 233-234 "Bauart Leipzig"	Multi	Diesel-elec	Unmod.	World speed record. First diesel train faster than 200 km/h (124 mph)
202.6 km/h (126 mph)	1938-07-03		United Kingdom	LNER Class A4 No. 4468 Mallard	Loc	Steam	unknown	Downhill grade. Data indicates peak speed 202.6 km/h (126 mph), mean speed (half-mile) 201.2 km/h (125 mph). Mallard suffered an overheated crankpin during the run, but was repaired and returned to traffic within 9 days. This is the standing record for a steam locomotive. Analysis of the original dynamometer rolls in 2018 however points to several issues with the original authentication and a sustained maximum speed of 199.36 km/h (124 mph).
166.6 km/h (104 mph)	1934-07-20		United States	Milwaukee Road class F6 #6402	Loc	Steam	Unmod	A point between Oakwood, Illinois and Lake, Wisconsin. Also averaged 75.5 mph (122 km/h) on 85 miles (137 km) from Chicago, Illinois to Milwaukee, and 89.92 mph (145 km/h) for a 68.9 miles (110.9 km) stretch
161 km/h (100 mph)	1934-11-30	East Coast Main Line	United Kingdom	LNER Class A3 4472 Flying Scotsman	Loc	Steam	Unmod.	In 1934, Flying Scotsman achieved the first authenticated 100 mph (161 km/h) by a steam locomotive.
48 km/h (30 mph)	1829	Rainhill Trials	United Kingdom	Stephenson's Rocket	Loc	Steam	Unmod.	

==== Electric ====
The following is a list of speed records for rail vehicles with electric traction motors and powered by electricity transferred to the train.

Speed records of electric locomotive and electric multiple unit trains
Speed	Date	Line	Country	Train	Arr.	Power	State	Comments
574.8 km/h (357 mph)	2007-04-03	LGV Est	France	SNCF TGV POS Set No. 4402	Multi	Single phase	Tuned	Set formed of 2 power cars + 3 trailers. Current world record.
515.3 km/h (320 mph)	1990-05-18	LGV Atlantique	France	SNCF TGV Atlantique Set No. 325	Multi	Single	Tuned	Extensive modifications. Set formed of 5 cars. Definitive record for TGV No. 325.
487.3 km/h (303 mph)	2010-12-03	Beijing–Shanghai HSR	China	CRH380BL	Multi	Single phase	Unmod.	16-car trainset Current record for the top speed of an unmodified production vehicle.
486.1 km/h (302 mph)	2010-12-03	Beijing–Shanghai HSR	China	CRH380AL	Multi	Single phase	Unmod.	16-car trainset, near Sùzhōu
443.0 km/h (275 mph)	1996-07-26	Tōkaidō Shinkansen	Japan	Class 955 Shinkansen	Multi	Single phase	Proto	
425.0 km/h (264 mph)	1993-12-21	Jōetsu Shinkansen	Japan	Class 952/953 Shinkansen	Multi	Single phase	Proto	
421.4 km/h (262 mph)	2013-03-28	Gyeongbu high-speed railway	South Korea	Hyundai Rotem HEMU-430X	Multi	Single phase	Proto	six-car train set. maximum speed test.
416.6 km/h (259 mph)	2010-09-28	Shanghai–Hangzhou HSR	China	CRH380A	Multi	Single phase	Unmod.	
403.7 km/h (251 mph)	2006-07-15	Madrid–Barcelona HSR between Guadalajara and Calatayud	Spain	Siemens Velaro E (AVE S-103)	Multi	Single phase	Unmod.	15–16 July Record for the top speed of an unmodified production vehicle until 2010.
368.4 km/h (229 mph)	2001-09-03	Hannover–Berlin between Oebisfelde and Rathenow	Germany	ICE 3 (DB BR 406)	Multi	Single phase	Unmod.	The journey was carried out as a regular approval journey, whereby according to German regulations a speed of at least 10% higher to the approval speed must be reached during the approval process. Since the train was regularly approved for 330 km/h, at least 363 km/h had to be reached during the test run. Record for the top speed of an unmodified production vehicle until 2006.
362 km/h (225 mph)	2009-02-03	Bologna–Florence high-speed railway	Italy	ETR 500 Y1	Multi	Single phase	Tuned	Indoor Italian speed record, in the Monte Bibele tunnel on the high speed line between Florence and Bologna.
357 km/h (222 mph)	2006-09-02	Nuremberg–Ingolstadt high-speed railway	Germany	Siemens EuroSprinter ES64U4 No. 1216 050-5	Loc	AC	Unmod.	On Nuremberg–Ingolstadt high-speed railway, locomotive owned by ÖBB, pulling one car. Record for the maximum speed of an electric locomotive.
334.7 km/h (208 mph)	2003-07-30	High Speed 1	United Kingdom	Eurostar 3313/4, British Rail Class 373	Multi	AC	Unmod	The speed of 334.7 km/h was recorded at Nashenden Valley, just outside Rochester.
331 km/h (206 mph)	1955-03-29	"Les Landes", between Bordeaux and Dax	France	Jeumont-Schneider SNCF BB 9003-9004	Loc	DC	Tuned	Pulling 3 cars. Train was specially modified for the test. The track was badly damaged by the test.
319 km/h (198 mph)	1979-12-07	Oyama test track	Japan	Class 961 Shinkansen	Multi	Single phase	Proto.	test track, now part of Tōhoku Shinkansen
286 km/h (178 mph)	1972-02-24	Sanyō Shinkansen	Japan	Class 951 Shinkansen	Multi	Single phase	Proto.	
256 km/h (159 mph)	1963-03-30	Odawara test track	Japan	Class 1000 Shinkansen	Multi	Single phase	Proto.	Test track now part of Tōkaidō Shinkansen
210.2 km/h (131 mph)	1903-10-28	Royal Prussian Military Railway between Marienfelde and Zossen	Germany	AEG Experimental three-phase railcar	Multi	Triphase	Proto.	Overall speed record. Many sources say 27 October.
203 km/h (126 mph)	1939-20-07	Florence–Bologna "direttissima" and Bologna-Milan lines	Italy	ETR 200	Multi	DC	Unmod.	Record average speed between Bologna and Milan
203 km/h (126 mph)	1903-10-06	Royal Prussian Military Railway between Marienfelde and Zossen	Germany	Siemens & Halske Experimental three-phase railcar	Multi	Triphase	Proto.	After railbed was improved. Some sources say 7 October, others say 200.99 km/h (125 mph) or an improbable 231 km/h (144 mph).
180 km/h (112 mph)	1941	Chicago North Shore and Milwaukee Railroad	United States	Electroliner	Multi	DC. It used its OHEL system, not its 3rd rail system for the record run.	Unmod.	When the sets were received in 1941, during one test run the traction motors were allowed full field shunt to determine absolute maximum speed. It reached just over 110 mph (180 km/h), but at that speed the train reached highway crossings before the crossing gates fully closed, a dangerous situation. Thereafter, the sets were limited to 90 mph (140 km/h).
175 km/h (109 mph) or	1988-04-11	on the Waterloo to Weymouth route	United Kingdom	British Rail Class 442	N/A	DC third rail	Unmod.	World speed record for a 750 DC third rail train.
162.5 km/h (101 mph)	1901	Royal Prussian Military Railway between Marienfelde and Zossen	Germany	Siemens & Halske Experimental three-phase railcar	Multi	Triphase	Proto.	Early tests of AC power. Some sources say 160 km/h (99 mph) or 162 km/h (101 mph).
156 km/h (97 mph)	1930	Cincinnati and Lake Erie Railroad	United States	Red Devil (interurban)	Single	DC	Unmod.	Defeated a plane in a race for publicity.
141.22 km/h (87.75 mph)	1972-01-31	LIRR Main Line between Woodside and Jamaica	United States	R44 (New York City Subway car)	Multi	DC	Unmod.	World speed record for a subway train. When half the motors were disabled to simulate the weight of a rush-hour crowd, it still reached 124 km/h (77 mph). The cars were capable of even higher speeds, as the consist was still accelerating as it approached the end of the designated test track.

==== Fuel-electric ====
The following is a list of speed records for rail vehicles with on-board fuel to generate electricity for traction motors such as diesel-electric locomotive, diesel electric multiple unit and gas turbine-electric locomotive trains.

Speed record of fuel-electric rail vehicles
Speed	Date	Line	Country	Train	Arr.	Power	State	Comments
271 km/h (168 mph)	1993-10-05	Saint Petersburg — Moscow	Russia	TEP80	Loc	Diesel-elec	Proto.	Has documentation and video of the record attempt, but no verification from an independent witness.
256 km/h (159 mph)	2002-06-12; 2002-07-10	Madrid - Barcelona, Olmedo-Medina del Campo	Spain	Talgo XXI	Multi	Diesel-elec	Proto.	Claimed by the company for both dates.
238 km/h (148 mph)	1987-11-01	East Coast Main Line	United Kingdom	Class 43 (HST)	Multi	Diesel-elec	Modified	Current official diesel speed record listed in 2006 Guinness Book of Records
230.4 km/h (143 mph)	1973-06-12	East Coast Main Line	United Kingdom	HST prototype	Multi	Diesel-elec	Proto.	
205 km/h (127 mph)	1936-02-17		Germany	DRG SVT 137 233-234 "Bauart Leipzig"	Multi	Diesel-elec	Unmod.	World speed record. First diesel train faster than 200 km/h (124 mph)
181 km/h (112.5 mph)	1934-05-26		United States	Pioneer Zephyr	Multi	Diesel-elec	Unmod.	Long distance speed record, averaging 124.9 km/h (77.6 mph) over 1,633 km (1,015 mi) in thirteen hours and five minutes, and reaching a maximum speed of 181.1 km/h (112.5 mph).

==== Fuel-mechanic ====
The following is a list of speed records for rail vehicles with on-board fuel to mechanical energy to drive vehicle's wheels such as diesel-hydraulic trains and gas turbine locomotive trains that use mechanical transmission to power the drive wheels.

Speed record of fuel-mechanic rail vehicles
Speed	Date	Line	Country	Train	Arr.	Power	State	Comments
275 km/h (171 mph)	1967-12-20	Northeast Corridor	United States	UAC TurboTrain	Multi	Gas	unknown	

==== Steam ====
The following is a list of speed records for steam locomotives.

Note: All records with a faster speed than 202.6 km/h (126 mph) (the record set by Mallard) are claimed and have not been officially verified (compare rival claims section).

Speed record of steam rail vehicles
Speed	Date	Line	Country	Train	Arr.	Power	State	Comments
202.6 km/h (126 mph)	1938-07-03	East Coast Main Line	United Kingdom	LNER Class A4 No. 4468 Mallard	Loc	Steam	Unmod.	Downhill grade. Data indicates peak speed 202.6 km/h (126 mph), mean speed (half-mile) 201.2 km/h (125 mph). Mallard suffered an overheated center big end bearing (or crankpin) during the run, but was repaired and returned to traffic within 9 days. Mallard's record is the standing world speed record for a steam locomotive.
200.4 km/h (125 mph)	1936-05-11		Germany	Borsig DRG series 05 002	Loc	Steam	Unmod.	Level grade.
181.1 km/h (113 mph)	1935-04-05		United States	Milwaukee Road class A #2	Loc	Steam	unknown	This was the first streamlined oil-fired steam train in history. Claimed to have sustained 112.5 mph (181 km/h) for 14 miles (23 km). Average speed for 136 miles (219 km) between Milwaukee and New Lisbon, Wisconsin was 74.9 mph (121 km/h).
166.6 km/h (104 mph)	1934-07-20		United States	Milwaukee Road class F6 #6402	Loc	Steam	Unmod.	A point between Oakwood, Illinois and Lake, Wisconsin. Also averaged 75.5 mph (122 km/h) on 85 miles (137 km) from Chicago, Illinois to Milwaukee, and 89.92 mph (145 km/h) for a 68.9 miles (110.9 km) stretch. This trip was a test run for the feasibility of a new planned high speed passenger train service between Chicago and Minneapolis-St. Paul via Milwaukee, which came to fruition the next year as the Hiawatha.
161 km/h (100 mph)	1934-11-30	East Coast Main Line	United Kingdom	LNER Class A3 4472 Flying Scotsman	Loc	Steam	Unmod.	In 1934, Flying Scotsman achieved the first authenticated 100 mph (161 km/h) by a steam locomotive. (Note: The speed was measured and recorded using a mechanical device. The record was available for public inspection.)
165 km/h (102.3 mph)	1904-05-4	Exeter to Bristol Line	United Kingdom	GWR 3700 Class 3440 City of Truro	Loc	Steam	Unmod.	This was the first independently measured and published 100 mph (161 km/h) by a steam locomotive. (Note: This was recorded by Charles Rous-Marten, a highly experienced railway journalist who subsequently published his notebook. But since the times were recorded using a stopwatch they must remain unauthenticated. His stated figure of 102.3 mph comes from a single quarter-mile taking 8.8 seconds on a stopwatch with a 0.2 second minimum interval; the next step, 9.0 seconds, would equate to 100 mph.)
149 km/h (92.3 mph)	1895-10-24	Lake Shore and Michigan Southern Railway	United States	Brooks-built ten-wheeler and train	Loc	Steam	Unmod.	The engineer was presented with a memorial watch from the Webb C. Ball Company in a ceremony at the Brooks Locomotive Works offices on April 17, 1896.
145 km/h (90 mph)	1895	London and North Western Railway	United Kingdom	LNWR Improved Precedent Class No. 790 Hardwicke	Loc	Steam	unmod.	
160.9 km/h (100 mph)	1893-05-10		United States	Empire State Express No. 999	Loc	Steam	Unmod.	112 mph (180 km/h) claimed, which would make it the first wheeled vehicle to exceed 100 mph (161 km/h). Unauthenticated and dubious.
129 km/h (80 mph)	1840s	Great Western Main Line	United Kingdom	GWR Iron Duke class Iron Duke	Loc	Steam	unknown	
64 km/h (40 mph)	1830-09	Liverpool and Manchester Railway	United Kingdom	Northumbrian	Loc	Steam	unknown	
48 km/h (30 mph)	1829	Rainhill Trials	United Kingdom	Stephenson's Rocket	Loc	Steam	Unmod.	
8 km/h (5 mph)	1804-02-21	Merthyr Tramroad	United Kingdom	Richard Trevithick: World's first railway steam locomotive	Loc	Steam	Unmod.	On 21 February 1804 it successfully carried 11.24 tons of coal, five wagons and 70 men over the full distance, in 4 hours and 5 minutes, at an average speed of 2.4 mph (3.9 km/h).

==== Air propulsion ====
The following is a list of speed records for rail vehicles that use air propulsion to move rail vehicles while the wheels are rolling along the track.

Speed record of air propulsion rail vehicles
Speed	Date	Line	Country	Train	Arr.	Power	State	Comments
411.5 km/h (256 mph)	1974-08-14	High Speed Ground Test Center	United States	LIMRV	Loc	Gas turbine	Proto	Propelled by a linear induction motor assisted by a jet engine.
280 km/h (174 mph)	1928-06-23		Germany	Opel RAK III	Loc	Rocket	Proto.	Unmanned. Some sources say 254 km/h (158 mph) or 290 km/h (180 mph). See:

Using an air cushion and a monorail, the Aérotrain set on 5 March 1974 a mean speed of 417.6 km/h (259.5 mph) and a peak speed of 430.4 km/h (267.4 mph).

=== Conventional wheeled – Narrow gauge ===
Speed	Date	Line	Country	Train	Arr	Power	State	Comments
245 km/h (152 mph)	1978-10-31	Between Westonaria and Midway	South Africa	SAR Class 6E1 (No. E1525)	Loc	Single phase	unknown	3 ft 6 in (1,067 mm) Scheffel bogie
210 km/h (130 mph)	1999	Queensland Rail North Coast Line	Australia	Electric Tilt Train	Multi	AC	Unmod.	3 ft 6 in (1,067 mm) Tilting train
175 km/h (109 mph)	1960-11-21	JNR Tōkaidō Main Line	Japan	JNR KuMoYa93 test car	Multi	DC	Proto.	3 ft 6 in (1,067 mm)
163 km/h (101 mph)	1959-07-31	JNR Tōkaidō Main Line	Japan	JNR 151 series	Multi	DC	unknown	3 ft 6 in (1,067 mm)
145 km/h (90 mph)	1957-09-27	JNR Tōkaidō Main Line	Japan	Odakyū 3000 series SE Romancecar	Multi	DC	unknown	3 ft 6 in (1,067 mm)
136 km/h (85 mph)	1914		South-West Africa	OMEG Rail motor coach No. «Kronprinz»	Single	Gasoline	unknown	600 mm (1 ft 11 5/8 in) Summer 1914.
129 km/h (80 mph)	1954-12-15	JNR Tokaido Main Line	Japan	JNR Class C62 No. C62 17	Loc	Steam	unknown	3 ft 6 in (1,067 mm)
127 km/h (79 mph)	1914		Indonesia	Staatsspoorwegen SS Class 700	Single	Steam	Unmod.	3 ft 6 in (1,067 mm)

The European speed record on meter gauge was achieved in the night from 8th to 9th July 2022. A Rhaetian Railway class ABe 4/16 train made by Stadler Rail reached 163 kph during testing in the Vereina tunnel.

=== Maglev trains ===
Speed	Date	Line	Country	Train	Arr	Power	State	Comments
603 km/h (375 mph)	2015-04-21	Yamanashi Test Track	Japan	L0 Series	Multi	AC	Proto.	Seven-car train set, manned
590 km/h (367 mph)	2015-04-16	Yamanashi Test Track	Japan	L0 Series	Multi	AC	Proto.	Seven-car train set, manned
581 km/h (361 mph)	2003-12-02	Yamanashi Test Track	Japan	MLX01	Multi	AC	Proto.	Three-car train set. Guinness Book of Records authenticated.
552 km/h (343 mph)	1999-04-14	Yamanashi Test Track	Japan	MLX01	Multi	AC	Proto.	Five-car train set. Guinness Book of Records authenticated.
501 km/h (311 mph)	2003-11-12	Shanghai Maglev Train	China	Transrapid SMT	Multi	AC	Unmod.	Recorded in 2003 at a test run before the commercial operation in 2004

== World fastest point-to-point average speeds in commercial operations ==
The following are the lists of world record average operating speeds between two stations. The average speeds are measured by the total time and the distance between the two stations.

=== All commercially operated trains ===
World record average operating speeds of trains in commercial traffic
Average speed	Top speed	Train	Type	Location	From	To	Distance	Duration	Date from	Date to	Comments
317.7 km/h (197 mph)	350 km/h (217 mph)	Fuxing (train)	Single phase	China	Beijing	Nanjing	1,021.9 km (635 mi)	193 min	2025		On Beijing-Shanghai High-Speed Railway
283.7 km/h (176 mph)	300 km/h (310 km/h with +10 tolerance)	CRH380	Single phase	China	Shijiazhuang	Zhengzhou	383.0 km (238 mi)	81 min	2013		On Shijiazhuang–Wuhan high-speed railway
279.3 km/h (174 mph)	320 km/h (199 mph)	TGV Duplex	Single phase	France	Lorraine	Champagne-Ardenne	167.6 km (104 mi)	36 min	2007	2010	On the LGV Est
271.5 km/h (169 mph)	320 km/h (199 mph)	E5 series shinkansen	Single phase	Japan	Ōmiya	Sendai	294.1 km (183 mi)	65 min	2011		With the Hayabusa service on the Tohoku Shinkansen line
263.3 km/h (164 mph)	320 km/h (199 mph)	TGV Duplex	Single phase	France	Lyon–Saint-Exupéry Airport	Aix-en-Provence	289.6 km (180 mi)	66 min	2005	2007	On the LGV Méditerranée
261.8 km/h (163 mph)	300 km/h (186 mph)	Nozomi Shinkansen	Single phase	Japan	Hiroshima	Kokura	192.0 km (119 mi)	44 min	1997	2005	Operated by 500 Series Shinkansen
249.5 km/h (155 mph)	431 km/h (268 mph)	Shanghai Maglev Train	AC (Maglev)	China	Longyang Road	Pudong International Airport	29 km (18 mi)	7 minutes 20 seconds	2003		Average and maximum speeds during peak operation 09:00–10:45 and 15:00–15:45
235.8 km/h (147 mph)	310 km/h (193 mph)	AVE S-103	Single phase	Spain	Madrid-Atocha	Barcelona-Sants	620.9 km (386 mi)	158 min	2008		On Madrid–Barcelona high-speed rail line
232.4 km/h (144 mph)	300 km/h (186 mph)	ICE 3	Single phase	Germany	Frankfurt Airport	Siegburg/Bonn	143.3 km (89 mi)	37 min	2006		On Cologne–Frankfurt high-speed rail line
223.2 km/h (139 mph)	320 km/h (199 mph)	Al Boraq	Single phase	Morocco	Tanger-Ville	Kenitra-Ville	186 km (116 mi)	50 min	2018		On Casablanca–Tangier high-speed rail line
219.9 km/h (137 mph)	320 km/h (199 mph)	Eurostar e300/e320	Single phase	United Kingdom, France	London St Pancras	Paris Gare du Nord	491 km (305 mi)	134 min	2007		On High Speed 1, Channel Tunnel, LGV Nord. On a trip 2007 the train took 124 min, which equals an average of 238.3 km/h (148 mph).
210.8 km/h (131 mph)	300 km/h (186 mph)	ETR500, Frecciarossa 1000, ETR575 "Italo"	Single phase	Italy	Milano Centrale	Bologna Centrale	214.7 km (133 mi)	61 min	2008		On Milan-Bologna high speed railway
254.3 km/h (158 mph)	300 km/h (186 mph)	TGV	Single phase	France	Gare de Lille Europe	Charles de Gaulle Airport	203.4 km (126 mi)	48 min	1995	1997	On LGV Interconnexion Est and LGV Nord. Historical
130.4 km/h (81 mph)	161 km/h (100 mph)	Morning Hiawatha	Steam	United States	Sparta, Wisconsin	Portage, Wisconsin	126.0 km (78 mi)	58 min	1939	1971	78.3 miles (126.0 km) in 58 minutes, Milwaukee Road class F7. Historical
114.8 km/h (71 mph)	148.7 km/h (92 mph)	Cheltenham Spa Express	Steam	United Kingdom	Swindon	London	124.3 km (77 mi)	65 min	1932	1933	77.25 miles (124.32 km) in 65 minutes. Claimed by the Great Western Railway at the time to be the world's fastest train. Now operated by GWR in 49 minutes with Class 800 Hitachi Intercity Express Train. Historical

== See also ==
- Land speed record
- List of vehicle speed records
- List of high-speed trains
- High-speed rail
- Schienenzeppelin, experimental car, driven by propeller, speed record for rail vehicles on 21 June 1931, 230.2 km/h (143.0 mph) on the Berlin–Hamburg Railway
- An unknown R44 set, which reached 141.22 km/h (87.75 mph) while testing on Long Island Railroad trackage
