= TGV world speed record =

Speed record achieved by TGV train

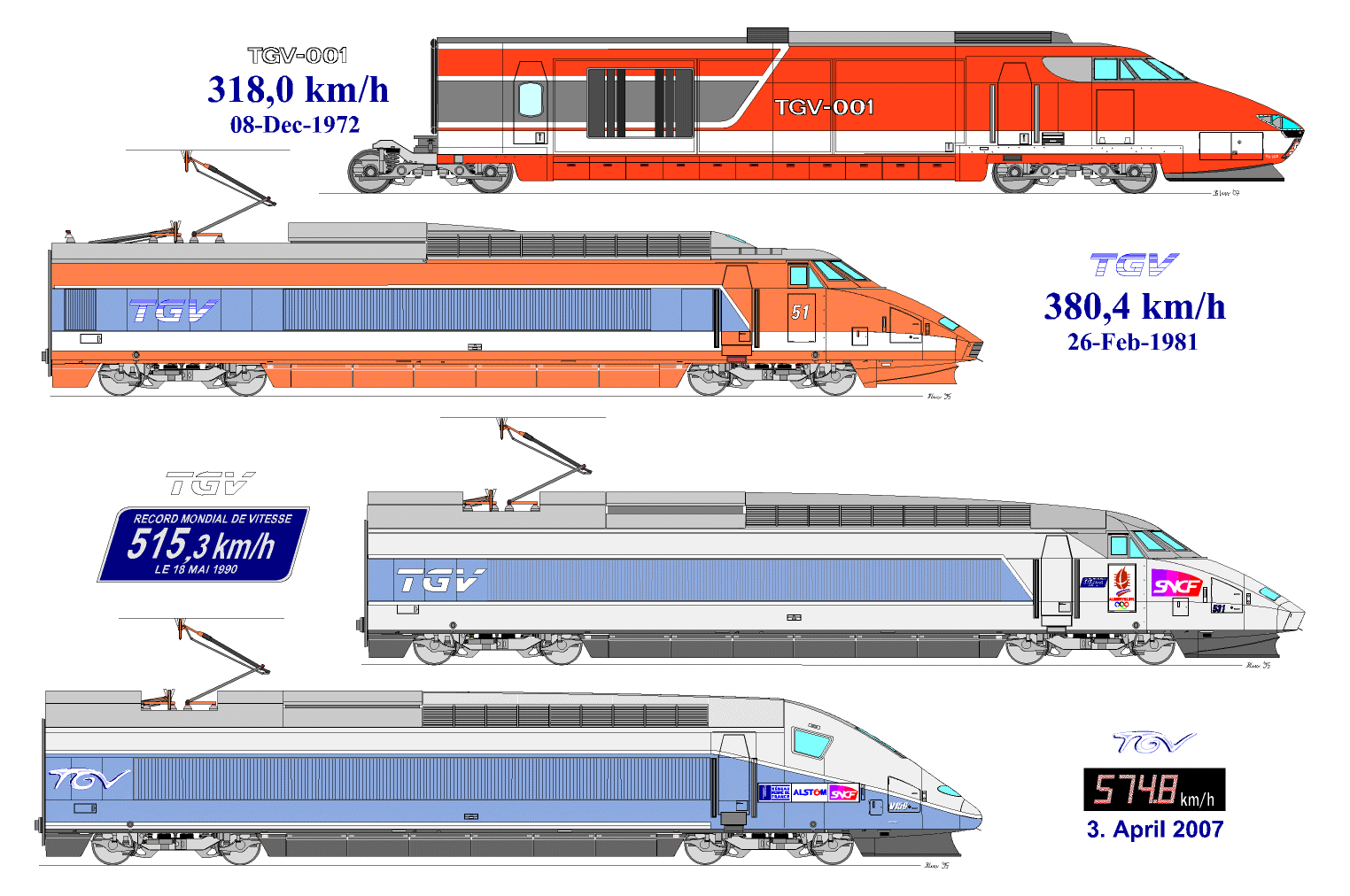
Four TGV records from 1972 to 2007

The TGV (train à grande vitesse, 'high-speed train') holds a series of land speed records for rail vehicles achieved by SNCF, the French national railway, and its industrial partners. The high-speed trials are intended to expand the limits of high-speed rail technology, increasing speed and comfort without compromising safety.

The current world speed record for a commercial train on steel wheels is held by the French TGV at 574.8 km/h (357.2 mph), achieved on 3 April 2007 on the new LGV Est.

== TGV 001 ==
The TGV 001 was an experimental gas turbine-electric locomotive-powered trainset built by Alstom to break speed records between 250–300 kilometres per hour. It was the first TGV prototype and was commissioned in 1969, to begin testing in 1972. It achieved a top speed of 318 kilometres per hour (198 mph) on 8 December 1972.

== Record of 1981 ==
=== Operation TGV 100 ===
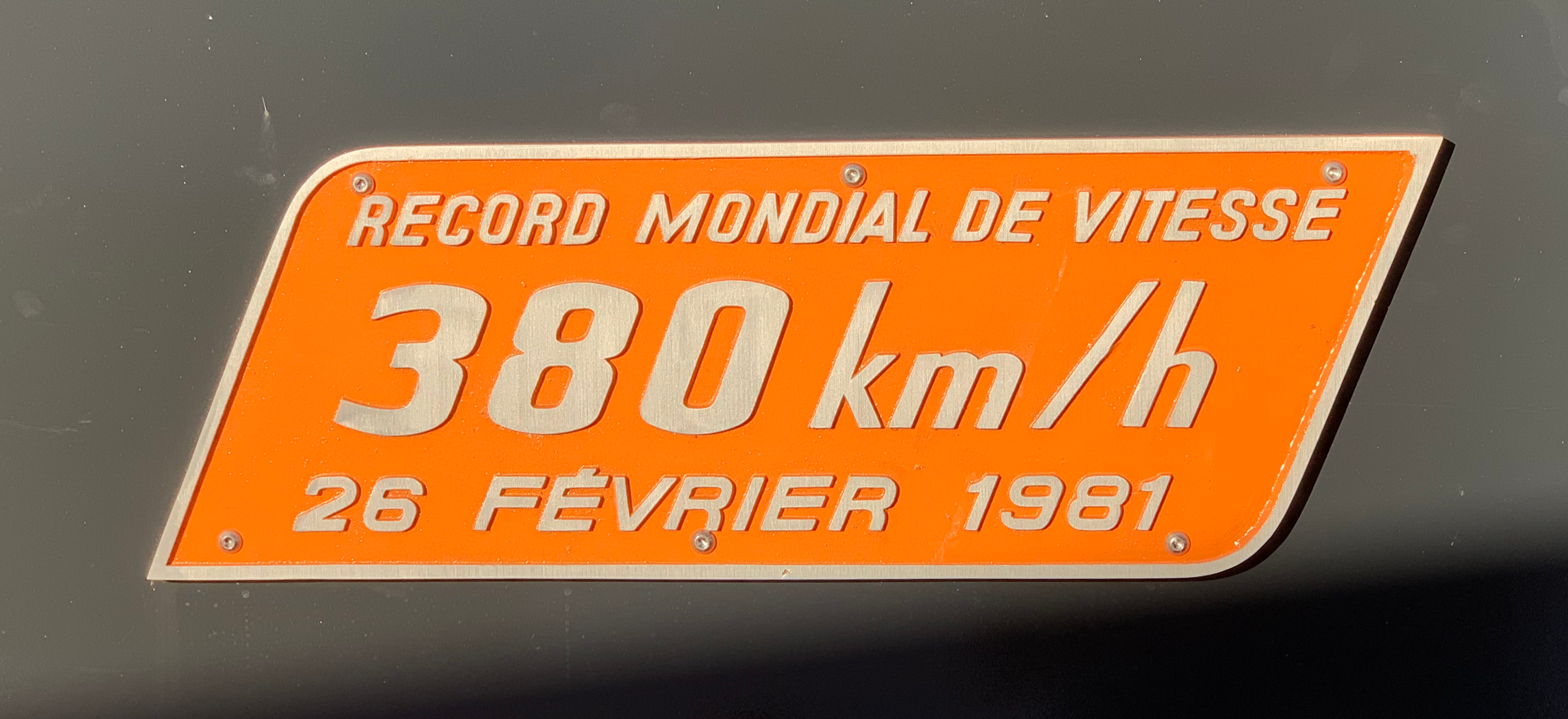
World Record plaque

Operation TGV 100, referring to a target speed of 100 metres per second (360 km/h, 224 mph), took place on 26 February 1981 shortly before the opening of the LGV Sud-Est and ended with a speed record of 380 km/h (236 mph) set by TGV Sud-Est trainset number 16.

== Record of 1990 ==
=== Overview ===
Operations TGV 117 and TGV 140, referring to target speeds in metres per second, were carried out by SNCF from November 1989 to May 1990. The culmination of these test programs was a new world speed record of 515.3 km/h (143.1 m/s or 320.3 mph), set on 18 May 1990.

In the early stages when operation TGV 117 was still being defined, several criteria were settled upon to focus the preparation of a test train. These were aerodynamics, traction and electrical systems, rail and catenary contact, braking, and comfort.

The basic purpose of the test program was to push the envelope of the TGV system, and to characterize its behavior at very high speeds. With this in mind, it only made sense to start with a stock TGV trainset and to modify it as little as possible. Brand new TGV Atlantique trainset number 325 (25th of 105 in the Atlantique series) was arbitrarily chosen to be the starting point of the modifications. There was nothing special about this trainset, and it was returned to its intended state after the test program to enter revenue service. Today, the only distinguishing feature on 325, as compared to other Atlantique trainsets, is a blue ribbon painted across the nose, and bronze plaques bolted to the sides of the two power cars to commemorate the event.

The record runs took place in two separate campaigns, separated by a period of modifications to trainset 325. For each day of testing, the 325 was towed to the test site by TGV Atlantique trainset 308 because its 1500 V DC systems had been removed, preventing operations near Paris. Trainset 308 also performed a sweep of the test track at 350 km/h before each high-speed run.

The test runs took place on a section of the Atlantique branch of the TGV network, a few months before the line was opened to TGV revenue service. Strictly speaking, there were no significant alterations of the track or catenary for testing purposes. However, some sections of the line's profile had been planned since 1982 (shortly after the TGV Sud-Est world speed record of February 1981) to allow very high-speed running.

Construction of the dedicated tracks of the LGV Atlantique was officially decided on 25 May 1984. Ground was broken on 15 February 1985. The new line was to stretch from slightly outside the Gare Montparnasse in Paris to Le Mans, with a second branch towards Tours. The Le Mans branch was opened for 300 km/h (186 mph) revenue service on 20 September 1989, and the Tours branch opened a year later. The two branches separate at Courtalain, 130 km west of Paris, where movable frog points good for 220 km/h (137 mph) in the diverging route direct trains towards either Le Mans or Tours.

=== Location ===
The test section itself begins on the common branch, at kilometre 114, at the Dangeau siding. It runs past Courtalain and onto the Tours branch of the line. Between kilometre 135 and kilometre 170, the line was designed with progressively wider curves, reaching a minimum radius of 15 km (9.3 mi) after kilometre 150. These curves were built with larger superelevation than strictly necessary for running at 300 km/h (186 mph). At kilometre 160, the line passes through the Vendôme TGV station. At kilometre 166, there is a long 2.5% downhill stretch into the Loir valley (the Loir is a tributary of the better-known Loire river) and the line crosses the Loir on a 175 m (575 ft) bridge. This is the area where the highest speeds were expected, and most of the activity was concentrated there.

=== Track preparation ===
The Tours branch of the line was tested by special computerized Maintenance of Way equipment manufactured by GEISMAR, from the Track Research department of SNCF. Just as on all TGV lines, the rails were aligned to 1 mm (0.039 in) tolerances, and the ballast was blasted to remove small, loose gravel. In subsequent testing with trainsets 308 and 325, the track was not significantly affected and required only minimal realignment. This was in contrast to the 1955 world speed record of 331 km/h (206 mph), also set in France, where the track was seriously damaged after the high-speed runs. Large sections of the track were warped and misshapen, as well as the train's pantograph was melted. Strain gauges were placed in several locations, especially at the expansion joint at the end of the Loir bridge.

==== Catenary modifications ====
The catenary was standard TGV style, without any modifications. The only changes were in the tuning. In general, when a pantograph passes under the catenary, it creates a wave-like disturbance that travels down the wire at a speed determined by the tension in the wire and its mass per unit length. As a train approaches this critical speed, the pantograph catches up with the disturbance, causing dangerously large vertical displacements of the wire and contact interruptions. The maximum speed of the train is then limited by the critical speed of the overhead line. This problem was central to the test runs, as it was desired to test the 325 set at speeds well above the critical speed of the standard TGV catenary. There were two solutions: increase the tension in the wire or reduce its mass per unit length.

The TGV catenary is strung in 1,200 m (3,900 ft) sections and mechanically tensioned by a system of pulleys and counterweights. The masts are spaced at 54 m (177 ft) apart. The messenger wire is bronze with a circular cross-section of 65 mm^{2} (0.101 in^{2}). The contact wire is copper with a cross-section of 150 mm^{2} (0.23 in^{2}). The cross-section of the contact wire is circular with a dovetail cut at the top.

Replacing the copper contact wire by a lighter cadmium alloy wire was considered, but dismissed on the grounds of time and cost. The critical speed of the test track catenary was then to be increased solely by increasing the tension in the wire. For the test runs, the usual tension of 20 kN (4,500 lbf) was increased to 28 kN (6,300 lbf) and exceptionally 32 kN (7,200 lbf). For some of the faster runs over 500 km/h (310 mph), the voltage in the catenary was increased from the usual 25 kV 50 Hz to 29.5 kV.

At kilometre 166, catenary masts were equipped with sensors to measure the displacement of the wire. During the 18 May 1990 record at 515.3 km/h (320.3 mph), vertical displacements of almost 30 cm (1 ft) were recorded, within 1 or 2 cm of the predictions made by computer simulations. The critical speed of the catenary for that particular run was 532 km/h (331 mph).

=== Preparation of the train for Operation TGV 117 ===
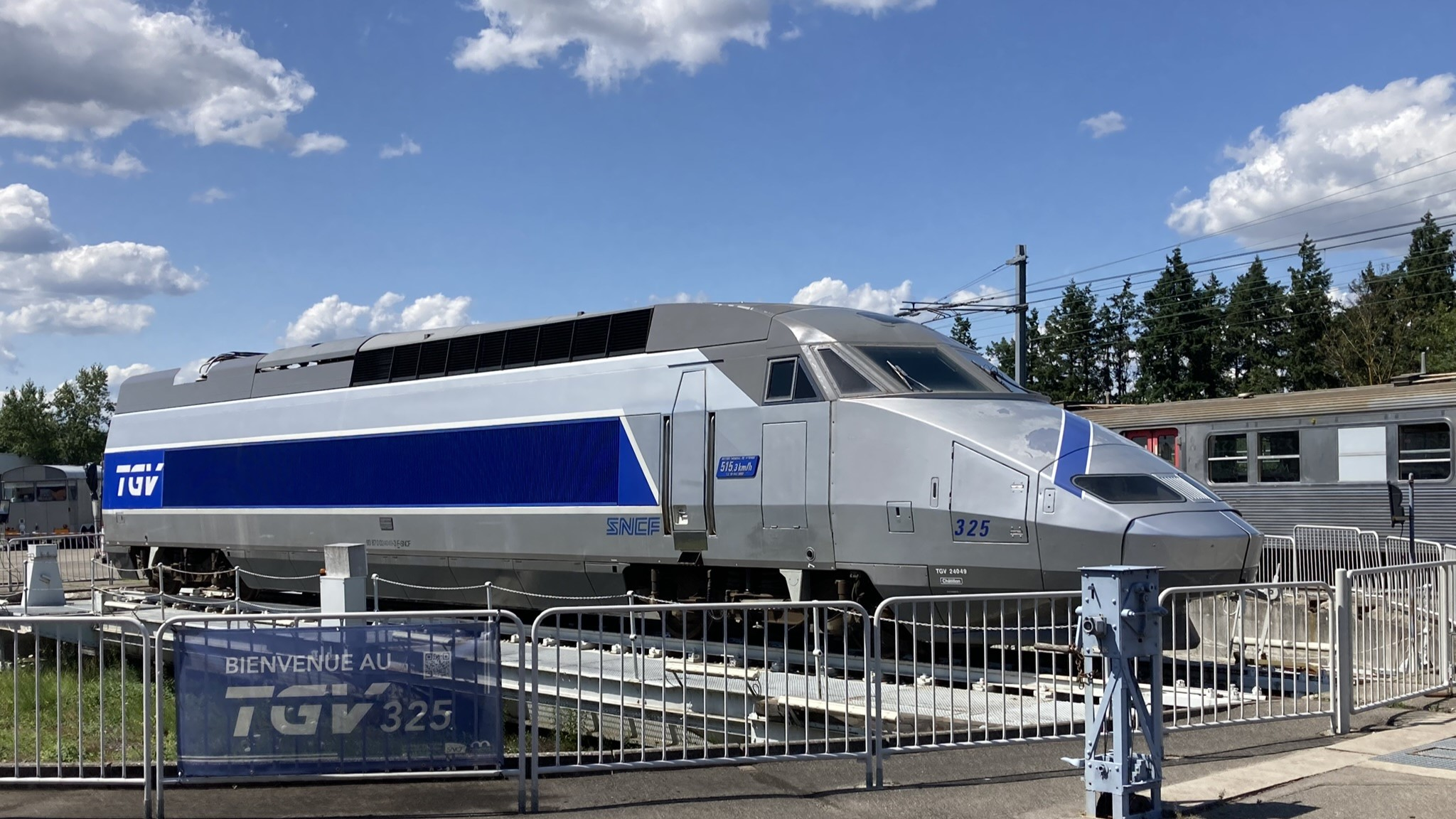
TGV powerhead 24049 of the world record train set 325 on display at the Cité du Train in Mulhouse

In preparation for the first round of testing, modifications began by shortening the train from its usual 10 trailers to only 4 trailers, resulting in a significant increase to its power-to-weight ratio. The resulting train consisted of: power car TGV24049, Trailer R1 TGVR241325, Trailer R4 TGVR244325, Trailer R6 TGVR246325, Trailer R10 TGVR240325 and power car TGV24050. Train length was down to 125 m (381 ft.) from 237 m (777 ft) and weight was down to 300 t from 490 t.

The aerodynamics of a TGV Atlantique are already quite good, and improvements were few. It was decided that 325 would have a "front" and "rear" for the high-speed runs, to simplify the modifications. Usually a TGV trainset is symmetric and reversible, but 325's two power cars, 24049 and 24050, were defined as leading and trailing units, respectively. On the roof of lead unit 24049, the pantographs were removed and the roof fairing extended over the opening; the same was done to the 1500 V DC pantograph on trailing unit 24050. Only one pantograph was to be used at high speed: the stock Faiveley GPU unit remaining on unit 24050. As in normal TGV running, the lead unit was to be fed power from the trailing unit through the roof line running the length of the train. Further improvements, such as rubber membranes covering the gaps between the trailers, and a rear spoiler on the trailing unit were considered, but abandoned.

The synchronous AC traction motors on 24049 and 24050 could not be allowed to rotate too fast, because of limitations in the switching frequency of the supply electronics. Technicians had decided upon 4000 rpm at 420 km/h (261 mph) to be the optimal ratio, after testing trainset 325 at high speeds with stock traction equipment. The new traction ratio was achieved by changing the transmission gearing and increasing the wheel diameter. Just as with the 1981 test campaign on TGV PSE number 16, 1050 mm (41 in) wheels replaced the stock 920 mm (36 in) wheels under 24049 and 24050.

To prevent electrical problems, semiconductor components (especially thyristors) were selected with special regard to quality. The main transformers in both power cars were replaced by larger models, each able to handle 6400 kW (8500 hp), or double the usual load, on a fairly continuous basis. Extensive tests were conducted on the electrical systems, to establish how far they could be pushed. The resulting ratings ensured that acceptable heat levels would never be exceeded in testing.

Next, the wheel-rail interface was attended to. Axle bearings were unmodified items, broken in for 10,000 km in revenue service on the LGV Sud-Est. Yaw dampers were stiffened, and doubled up on each side for a total of four yaw dampers on each truck, for redundancy in case of a high-speed failure. As a result of earlier testing and computer simulations, transverse dampers were stiffened on the power trucks.

The 1981 test campaign provided valuable data and computer models for interaction of the pantograph with the catenary contact wire, and shed light on the very sensitive dynamics. Very large vertical wire excursion (over 30 cm, or 1 foot) had been observed in the 1981 tests, and were blamed on the pantograph catching up with the travelling wave it set up in the contact wire. For this reason, it was not only necessary to modify the catenary to increase the travelling wave speed, but also to fine-tune the pantograph itself.

The pantograph used on 325 was the stock Faiveley GPU. The wiper assembly on this pantograph weighs under 8 kg (18 lb) and is mounted on a vertical shock absorber with 150 mm (6 in) travel. The main structure of the pantograph is constructed of cylindrical tubing, which (Faiveley claims) reduces the pantograph's sensitivity to random variations in environmental factors. The only modifications to the GPU pantograph were an increase in the stiffness of the pneumatic dampers, and a reduced total aerodynamic lift of the structure.

The suspension on the trailers was jacked up by 20 mm (1 in) by over-inflating the secondary suspension air bladders and inserting shims, to provide additional suspension travel and to make up for the larger wheels on the power cars.

The brakes on the trailers were tuned to allow a heat dissipation of 24 MJ per disk instead of the usual 18 MJ, with a total of 20 discs.

Many of the modifications listed above, including the synchronous traction motors, were tested at speeds over 400 km/h on TGV Sud-Est trainset 88. In one high-speed test, technicians attempted to provoke a truck into unstable oscillation by drastically reducing the yaw damping, but failed to achieve this.

Finally, most of the seating in trailer R1 was removed and the space was transformed into a laboratory, to process and record test data on vehicle dynamics, overhead contact and dynamics, tractive effort, aerodynamics, interior comfort and noise, and a host of other parameters.

On 30 November 1989, trainset 325 emerged from the Châtillon shops and set out for the test tracks for its first test run. Technicians at Châtillon put 4500 hours of work into the modifications, which was impressive when one considers that their first priority was the routine maintenance of the TGV Atlantique trainsets in revenue service.

=== Record run, Operation TGV 117 ===
The first campaign, also known as operation TGV 117, took place between 30 November 1989 and 1 February 1990. After several runs, problems with pantograph contact required manual adjustments to be made by first grounding the catenary and then sending technicians onto the roof. After a series of increasingly fast runs, the first official speed record of 482.4 km/h (299.8 mph) was set at kilometer point 166 on 5 December 1989, with engineer Michel Boiteau at the controls. At the end of this run, trainset 325 had accumulated 337 km (209 mi) at speeds exceeding 400 km/h (249 mph). More high-speed runs were made after this record, investigating effects such as the crossing of two trains with a closing velocity of 777.7 km/h (483 mph). With favorable results indicating that higher speeds were safe, the decision was made to further modify trainset 325 for speeds near 500 km/h (311 mph).

=== Preparation of the train for Operation TGV 140 ===
On 1 February 1990 at 15:30, 325 returned to the Châtillon shops for the long term. At this time, 325 had set a world record at 482.4 km/h (299.8 mph). Technicians had a 1 March deadline to perform further modifications designed to make possible further data collection and a 500 km/h (313 mph) publicity stunt. This second round of modifications was intended to take direct advantage of the experience gained in the first round.

The axles on 24049 and 24050 were removed and on 2 February, shipped to the Bischheim workshops in eastern France for fitting with even larger 1090 mm (43 in) wheels. The lead axle on 24049 was fitted with strain gauges, and returned to Châtillon 8 days after the other axles on 22 February. Initially, the second axle on 24049 had also been scheduled to be fitted with strain gauges, but the 1 March deadline did not allow enough time. To accommodate the bigger wheels, special brake pads had to be manufactured for the brake shoes on 24049 and 24050. With 15 mm (5/8 in) of thickness, only two emergency stops were guaranteed.

On 6 February, the trailers were jacked up and trailer R6 was removed. This brought 325 to the minimum possible consist, since the bar trailer R4 functions as the "keystone" of the articulated design of the TGV. 325 now weighed in at 250 t and measured 106 m (348 ft) nose to tail. From 7 to 14 February, the three remaining trailers underwent further modifications. The 25 kV roof supply line to feed the lead unit was replaced by a single cable; this allowed the removal of the insulators supporting the line over the space between trailers, which protruded in the air stream. Rubber membranes were installed to cover the gaps between the trailers, and the Y237B trucks were jacked by 40 mm (1.5 in).

In the gap between power cars and trailers, large airdams were installed. These "snow shields", mounted beneath the couplers, were designed to prevent the formation of a low pressure area between the vehicles, which had induced significant drag in the earlier testing. On the power cars, sheet metal shields were added over the trucks, and the front airdam was extended downwards by 10 cm (4 in) to compensate for the larger wheels. Finally, a removable spoiler was installed on the nose of trailing unit 24050.

The aerodynamic improvements were supposed to yield a 10% reduction in drag. In the previous round of testing, the atmospheric drag force had reached 88 kN at a speed of 460 km/h (286 mph). On the new version of 325, this magnitude of drag was not expected before 500 km/h (311 mph).

On 27 February 1990, after the trainset was coupled together, 325 rolled out from the Châtillon shops for the second time, 2 days ahead of schedule. This time, 2000 hours of shop labour were required to accomplish the changes. The second campaign of testing, culminating in the standing world speed record of 515.3 km/h (320.3 mph) is summed up in the chronology of the record runs.

=== Record run, Operation TGV 140 ===
The second campaign, also known as operation TGV 140, took place between 5 March 1990 and 18 May 1990, after the train modifications were complete. On the first high-speed run, an electrical malfunction destroyed the main transformer of the rear power car and damaged many low voltage circuits. The damage was found to require nearly a month of repairs, primarily because a new transformer able to sustain the high power loads had to be prepared. The 325 returned to testing on 4 May 1990 and exceeded the 5 December record on its first run of the day. The 500 km/h (311 mph) mark was unofficially broken on 9 May 1990, with runs at 506.5 km/h (315 mph) and 510.6 km/h (317.3 mph). The switches in the Vendôme station were passed at 502 km/h (312 mph). Instability of the contact dynamics between the pantograph and catenary caused trouble during the next several days, although intermittent runs achieved speeds above 500 km/h. Following the resolution of this problem, the final record attempt took place on 18 May 1990, with dignitaries, and journalists joining the usual complement of technicians on board the train. The 325 started its run at 9:51 from Dangeau and accelerated for 15 minutes, achieving a top speed of 515.3 km/h (320.3 mph) at the bottom of the hill at kilometer post 166.8. At the conclusion of the test campaign, the train had reached top speeds in excess of 500 km/h on nine separate occasions, including the world speed record.

== Record of 2007 ==
=== Overview ===
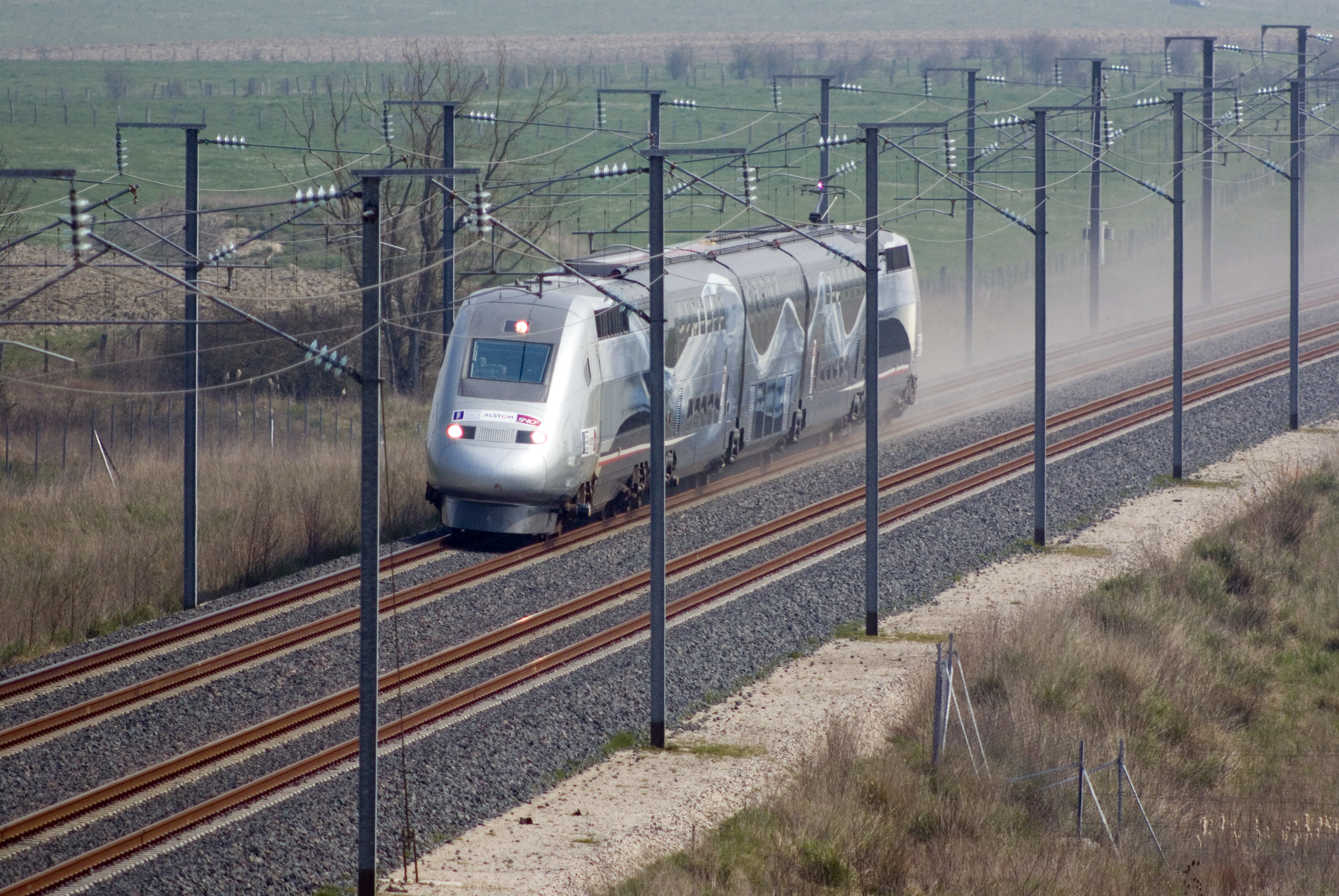
TGV 4402 operation V150 reaching 574 km/h on 3 April 2007 near Le Chemin, France.

Operation V150, where 150 again refers to a target speed in metres per second, was a series of high-speed trials carried out on the LGV Est prior to its June 2007 opening. The trials were conducted jointly by SNCF, TGV builder Alstom, and LGV Est owner Réseau Ferré de France between 15 January 2007 and 15 April 2007. Following a series of increasingly high-speed runs, the official speed record attempt took place on 3 April 2007. The top speed of 574.8 km/h (159.7 m/s, 357.2 mph) was reached at kilometer point 193 near the village of Le Chemin, between the Meuse and Champagne-Ardenne TGV stations, where the most favorable profile exists. It reached top speed 12 minutes 40 seconds and 71 km after leaving Prény from a standstill.

The 515.3 km/h speed record of 1990 was unofficially broken multiple times during the test campaign that preceded and followed the certified record attempt, the first time on 13 February 2007 with a speed of 554.3 km/h, and the last time on 15 April 2007 with a speed of 542.9 km/h.

=== Track preparation ===
The record runs took place on a 140 km section of track 1 on the LGV Est, usually heading west, between kilometer posts 264 (town of Prény) and 120 (near the Champagne-Ardenne TGV station). This section of the LGV was chosen for its vertical profile and gentle curves, with favorable downhill segments leading to the highest speeds between kilometer posts 195 and 191, near the border between the Meuse and Marne departments. The track superelevation was increased to support higher speeds. Catenary voltage was increased to 31 kV from the standard 25 kV. The mechanical tension in the wire was increased to 40 kN from the standard 25 kN. The speed of the transverse wave induced in the overhead wire by the train's pantograph was thus increased to 610 km/h, providing a margin of safety beyond the train's maximum speed. Several measurement stations were installed along the test tracks to monitor stresses in the track and ballast, noise, aerodynamic effects, and catenary dynamics. Between kilometer posts 223 and 167, where speeds exceeded 500 km/h, the track was under close surveillance.

=== Preparation of the train for Operation TGV 150 ===
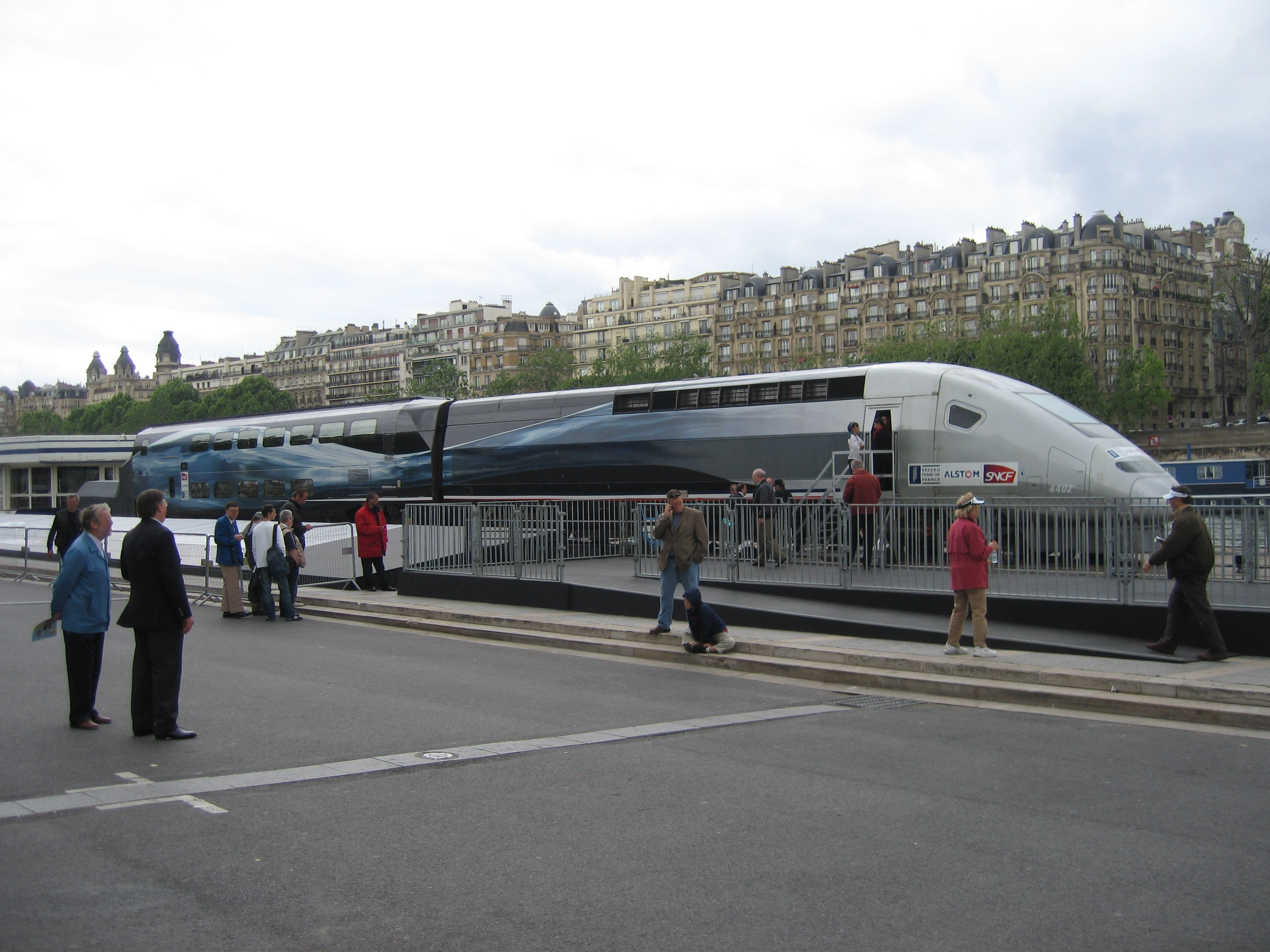
Part of TGV trainset 4402 displayed near the Eiffel Tower after the record

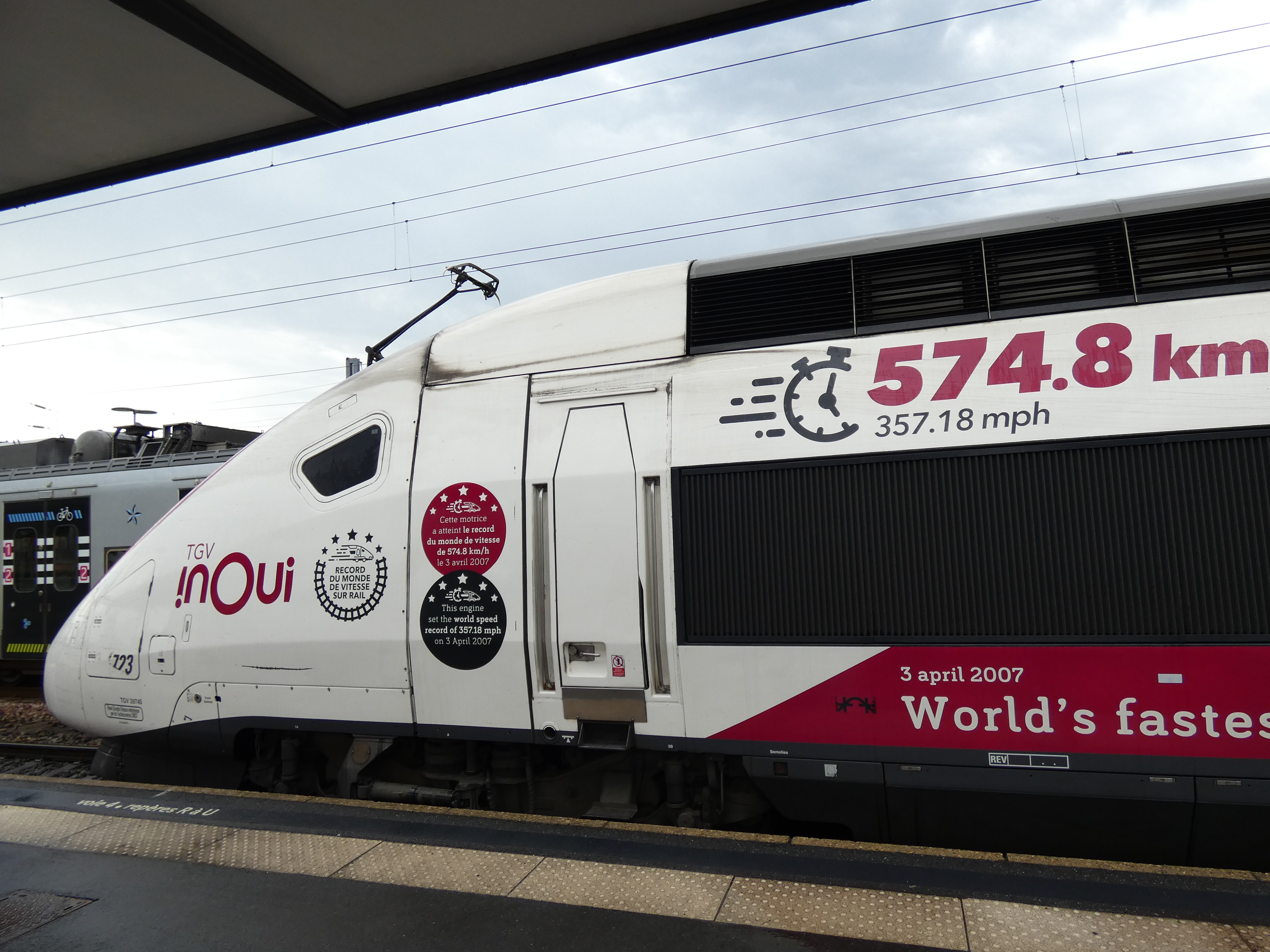
TGV trainset 4402 has become trainset 723, and bears a livery recalling the record-setting run

The train used for the speed record was code named V150, and comprised three modified Duplex cars, fitted with two powered bogies similar to the AGV prototype, marshalled between a pair of TGV power cars from POS trainset 4402. The train had four more powered axles than trainset 325 used in the 1990 speed record, and had a maximum power output of 19.6 MW (26,800 hp) instead of the 9.3 MW on a standard TGV POS. This unusual composition was used to obtain high-speed test data on disparate technical elements including the new asynchronous traction motors on the POS power cars, the lightweight synchronous permanent magnet traction motors on the AGV bogies, the actively controlled pantograph, and the Duplex bi-level configuration which had never been used in very high-speed trials.

Aerodynamic improvements, similar to the 1990 record train, were refined in a wind tunnel and provided a 15% reduction in drag from the standard configuration. These improvements included a front air dam, roof fairings over the pantograph openings, membranes to cover the space between the cars, and a flush-mounted windshield. Over 600 sensors were fitted on various parts of both the engines and the cars. The train set ran with larger wheels with a diameter of 1092 mm instead of 920 mm, to limit the rotational speed of the powertrain.

=== Record run, Operation TGV 150 ===
Between 15 January 2007 and 15 April 2007, the V150 train traveled at 500 km/h and above for a cumulative distance of 728 km. For each high-speed run, another TGV performed a sweep of the track before the V150 train was cleared to start. This sweep was performed at a sustained 380 km/h, incidentally the peak speed reached in the record of 1981, with TGV POS trainset 4404 in a standard 8-car configuration. The acceleration of the V150 train took place over a distance of 70 km. During certain runs, including the official record run, the V150 train was chased by an Aérospatiale Corvette airplane to provide data relay and uplink of live television images.

== See also ==
- Land speed record for rail vehicles
- AGV Automotrice à grande vitesse - TGV Replacement
