= TEP80 =

Class of 2 Soviet (Bo′+Bo′)(Bo′+Bo′) diesel-electric locomotives

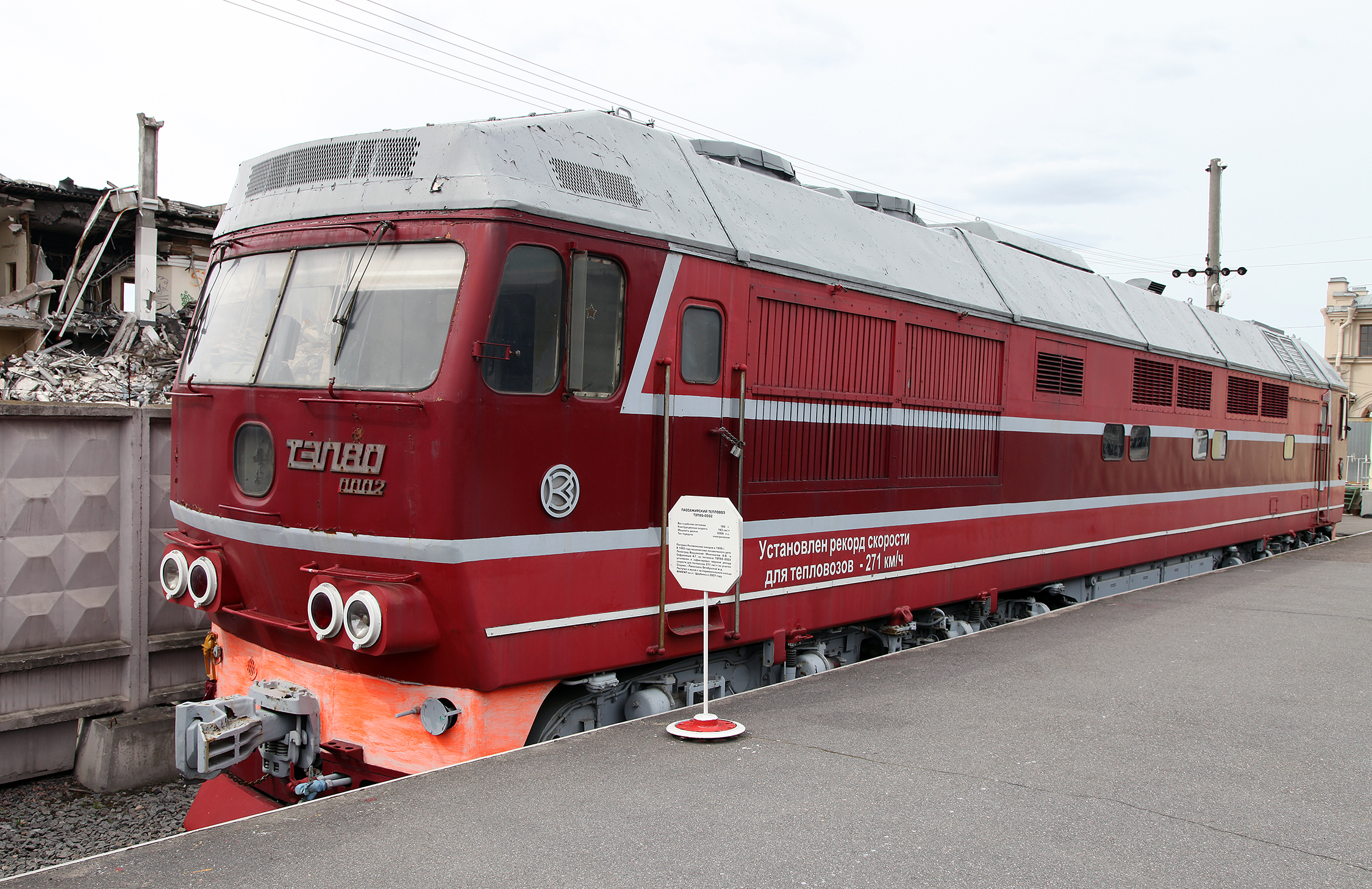
- TEP80-0002 at Varshavsky Rail Terminal, St. Petersburg
Type and origin
- Power type: Diesel–electric
- Builder: Kolomensky Zavod
- Serial number: TEP 80 0001 - 0002
- Build date: 1988–1989
- Total produced: 2
Specifications
- Configuration
  - AAR: B+B-B+B
  - UIC: (Bo′+Bo′)(Bo′+Bo′)
- Gauge: 1,520 mm (4 ft 11 27/32 in) Russian gauge
- Axle load: 22.5 t (22.1 long tons; 24.8 short tons)
- Loco weight: 180.0 t (177.2 long tons; 198.4 short tons)
- Prime mover: 1D49-20 Cylinder
- Engine type: V20
- Aspiration: Twin turbo, sequential turbocharging
- Generator: GS-519U2 ГС-519У2
- Traction motors: ED-121VUHL1 (8 of) ЭД-121ВУХЛ1
Performance figures
- Maximum speed: 160 km/h (99 mph); 271 km/h (168 mph)
- Power output: 6,000 hp (4,500 kW))
- Tractive effort: 240 kN (54,000 lb_{f}) @ 50 km/h (31 mph)
Career
- Disposition: TEP80-0001 exhibit at Museum for Railway Technology Novosibirsk TEP80-0002 exhibit at October Railway museum, Saint Petersburg

The TEP80 (ТЭП80) is a Soviet diesel locomotive produced in 1988–1989. Only two locomotives were built.

== History and design ==
The principal designer was V. Khlebnikov; the locomotive utilised an 8-axle articulated design within a single locomotive body, two sets of main bogies each of four axles articulated in a Bo-Bo arrangement.

It is claimed that Unit TEP80-0002 holds the world speed record for a diesel railed vehicle having reached 271 km/h (168 mph) on 5 October 1993. This record has not been verified by any independent witness. In 2007, the machine was transferred from the Russian Railway research institute (VNIIZhT) to the October railway museum (Музей Октябрьской железной дороги) in Saint Petersburg.

== See also ==
- History of rail transport in Russia
