= Milwaukee Road class F6 =

Class of 14+8 two-cylinder 4-6-4 locomotives

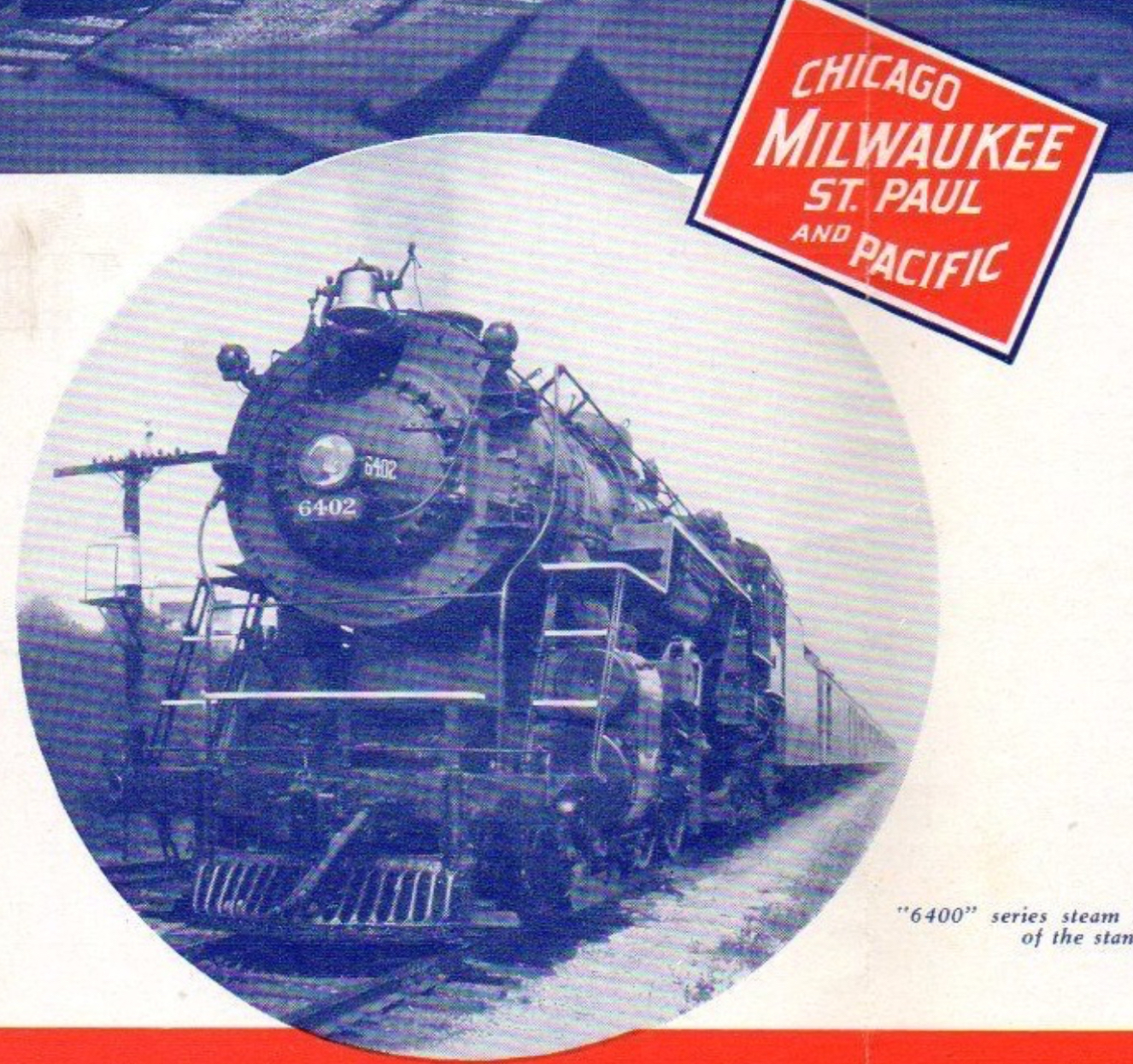
- Milwaukee Road class F6 locomotive #6402.
Type and origin
- Power type: Steam
- Builder: Baldwin Locomotive Works
- Serial number: 61135–61148
- Build date: January–March 1930
Specifications
- Configuration
  - Whyte: 4-6-4
  - UIC: 2′C2′ h2
- Gauge: 4 ft 8 1/2 in (1,435 mm) standard gauge
- Leading dia.: 36 in (914 mm)
- Driver dia.: 80 in (2,032 mm)
- Trailing dia.: 43 in (1,092 mm)
- Loco weight: 375,850 lb (170,480 kilograms; 170.48 metric tons)
- Total weight: 532,000 lb (241,000 kilograms; 241 metric tons)
- Fuel type: Coal
- Fuel capacity: 40,000 lb (18,000 kilograms; 18 metric tons)
- Water cap.: 15,000 US gal (57,000 L; 12,000 imp gal)
- Firebox
  - Grate area: 80 sq ft (7.4 m^{2})
- Boiler pressure: 225 lbf/in^{2} (1.55 MPa)
- Feedwater heater: Coffin flush in smokebox
- Cylinders: Two
- Cylinder size: 26 in × 28 in (660 mm × 711 mm)
- Valve gear: Baker valve gear
Performance figures
- Tractive effort: 45,820 lbf (203.8 kN)
Career
- Operators: Milwaukee Road
- Class: F6
- Number in class: 14
- Numbers: 6400–6413; renumbered 125–138 in 1938
- Delivered: 1929
- Retired: 1952–1954
- Disposition: All scrapped

Milwaukee Road class F6-a
- Milwaukee Road F6-a locomotive #6417. Photo by Otto Perry at Chicago, Illinois on September 25, 1935.
Type and origin
- Only items that differ from class F6 above are shown
- Power type: Steam
- Builder: Baldwin Locomotive Works
- Serial number: 61655–61662
- Build date: October–November 1931
Specifications
- Configuration
  - Whyte: 4-6-4
- Gauge: 1,435 mm (4 ft 8 1/2 in)
- Wheelbase: Loco: 40 ft 9 in (12.42 m)
- Height: 15 ft 6 in (4.72 m)
- Loco weight: 380,220 lb (172,460 kilograms; 172.46 metric tons)
- Feedwater heater: Wilson Water Conditioner
Career
- Operators: Milwaukee Road
- Class: F6-a
- Number in class: 8
- Numbers: 6414–6421; renumbered 142–146, 139–141 in 1938

The Milwaukee Road classes F6 and F6-a comprised twenty-two steam locomotives of the 4-6-4 configuration, commonly nicknamed "Hudson" but known as "Baltic" on the Milwaukee Road.

The fourteen class F6 locomotives were not delivered from their builder, the Baldwin Locomotive Works of Philadelphia, Pennsylvania, until 1929–1930. In 1931, eight sister locomotives of class F6-a were delivered; these differed in few aspects but can be distinguished by the straight running boards of the F6-a, in contrast to the stepped running boards of the F6.

== Technical details ==
The 1925 design was by Milwaukee Road Chief Mechanical Engineer C. H. Bilty, with detail design by the Baldwin Locomotive Works, who actually built them. They represented the best of American locomotive practice at the time, and were given all the latest devices and fittings. A Coffin feedwater heater was fitted, which was the Milwaukee's favorite type; this was installed flush in the extended smokebox, and thus was not at all obvious. Possibly because of this, the boiler lagging was continued over the smokebox, which was not common; most North American locomotives had bare smokeboxes which were graphited, rather than painted. The associated steam-driven centrifugal water pump was located under the cab at the left rear. The class F6-a was fitted with the tender-mounted Wilson Water Conditioner instead of the Coffin feedwater heater.

Valve gear was of the low-maintenance Baker type, with (of course) power reverse. A front-end throttle was installed, with the distinctive linkage running along the boiler on the engineer's side. A mechanical lubricator, driven from the crosshead on the engineer's side, fed oil to the cylinders, valves, guides and other parts of the running gear. Many of the locomotives were fitted with a speedometer, which was attached to the engineer’s side frontmost leading axle.

A single air pump for the locomotive and train air brakes was fitted to the fireman's (left) side, with air tanks under the running boards on both sides. Like all larger North American coal-burning locomotives of the time, an automatic stoker was fitted; the two-cylinder engine to drive this was under the cab floor on the fireman's side.

== Modifications ==
Locomotive #6401 received large, "Elephant ear" smoke deflectors in 1936 as an experiment; these were kept for several years, but were not fitted to other locomotives. Later that year a sheet-steel pilot was fitted to it and several other locomotives to replace the boiler-tube pilot installed from new. This featured a swing-up coupler. As well as giving a more attractive, streamlined look, this had a serious safety aspect; a sheet-steel pilot without a protruding coupler was more likely to deflect an obstacle without catching on it in e.g. a grade crossing accident.

== Service ==
At first the locomotives were used mostly between Chicago and Minneapolis, but later on when the F6-a locomotives arrived they served as far west as the beginning of the electrified zone.

When delivered the class F6 were numbered 6400–6413, with the class F6-a numbered 6414–6421. At the 1938 renumbering, they were numbered 125–138 and 139–146

Table of locomotives
Original No.	1938 No.	Class	Baldwin serial No.	Built	Retired
6400	125	F6	61135	January 1930	June 1954
6401	126	F6	61136	January 1930	December 1954
6402	127	F6	61137	January 1930	February 1954
6403	128	F6	61138	January 1930	February 1954
6404	129	F6	61139	January 1930	December 1953
6405	130	F6	61140	January 1930	December 1952
6406	131	F6	61141	January 1930	September 1952
6407	132	F6	61142	January 1930	October 1952
6408	133	F6	61143	January 1930	October 1952
6409	134	F6	61144	January 1930	July 1954
6410	135	F6	61145	January 1930	September 1954
6411	136	F6	61146	February 1930	November 1954
6412	137	F6	61147	February 1930	December 1954
6413	138	F6	61148	March 1930	December 1954
6414	142	F6-a	61655	October 1931	December 1954
6415	143	F6-a	61656	October 1931	December 1954
6416	144	F6-a	61657	October 1931	December 1954
6417	145	F6-a	61658	October 1931	December 1954
6418	146	F6-a	61659	November 1931	December 1954
6419	139	F6-a	61660	November 1931	August 1952
6420	140	F6-a	61661	November 1931	June 1954
6421	141	F6-a	61662	November 1931	October 1952

== Speed record ==
On July 20, 1934, Milwaukee Road class F6 Baltic #6402 participated in a test run to prove the feasibility of a high-speed service, which was launched as the Hiawatha service in 1935. The test used a regular service train from Chicago, Illinois to Milwaukee, Wisconsin, train 29. This was redesignated as Second 27 just for that day and given a special, high-speed timing. With a five-car train of 840,000 pounds (380 t), #6402 completed the 85 miles (137 km) in 67 minutes and 37 seconds start to stop. The eventual Hiawatha timing was 75 minutes for this journey, and the Hiawatha timing was possibly the fastest scheduled train in the world in the 1930s.

While the ends of the trip were taken at relatively low speeds, the 68.74 miles (110.63 km) between the Chicago suburb of Mayfair and Lake, Wisconsin was completed in 45 minutes and 53 seconds, an average of 89.89 mph (144.66 km/h). Times were taken with a stopwatch as each station was passed, and in addition the locomotive was fitted with a speedometer; this recorded the speed on a chart, indicating a maximum of 103.5 mph (166.6 km/h) was reached. The fastest inter-station average speed was 95.6 mph (153.9 km/h) between Oakwood and Lake; British expert Brian Reed showed that the latter half of that was an uphill gradient and thus speeds in the first half must have been significantly higher than the overall average. He stated that:

This must be taken as the first time a U.S. steam loco topped “the hundred”.

More recently, British train timer Bryan Benn has taken the gradient profile given in Brian Reed's book and shown that it supports a maximum speed in excess of 101 mph during that portion of the run. He believes this is the first claim of over 100 mph (160 km/h) for a steam locomotive in which the surviving documentation strongly indicates its accuracy, and thus that #6402 was the record holder for steam locomotive speed for at least a short time.
