= SNCF TGV Atlantique =

Class of high-speed trains in France

SNCF TGV "Atlantique"
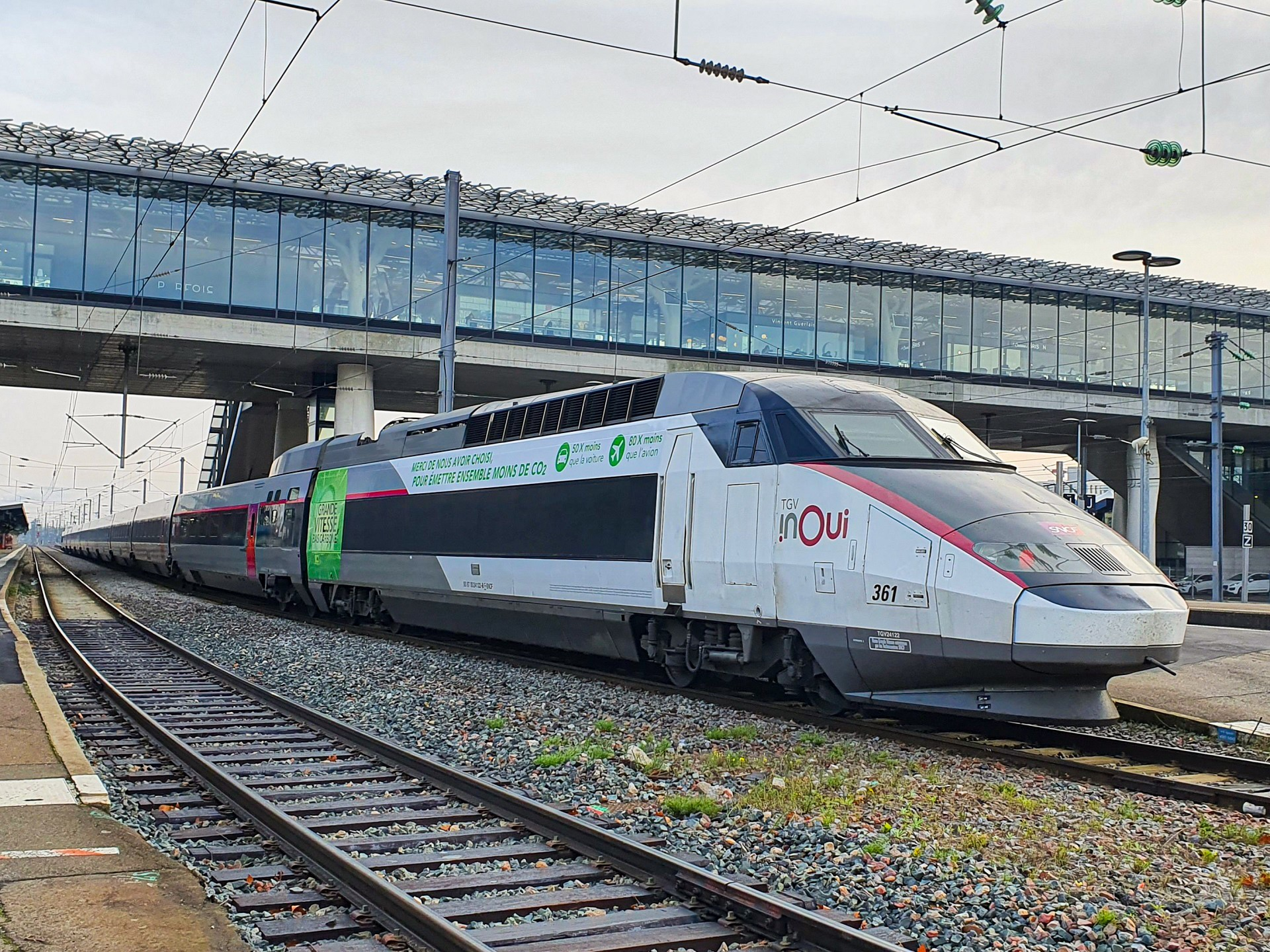
- TGV-A set 361 at Gare de Nantes
- In service: 1989–present
- Manufacturer: GEC-Alsthom
- Family name: TGV
- Refurbished: 2005–2010
- Number built: 105 trainsets
- Number in service: 28 trainsets
- Number scrapped: 77 trainsets
- Formation: 12 cars (2 power cars, 10 passenger cars)
- Capacity: 485, 459 (After refurbishment)
- Operator: SNCF

Specifications
- Train length: 237.5 m (779 ft 2 in)
- Width: Motor car 2.81 m (9 ft 3 in); Trailer 2.904 m (9 ft 6.3 in)
- Wheel diameter: 920 mm; World record: 1090 mm
- Maximum speed: 300 km/h (186 mph)
- Weight: 444 t (437 long tons; 489 short tons) (empty)
- Traction system: Thyristor-based current-source inverter by GEC-Alsthom
- Power output: 10,400 kW (13,947 hp) Max, 8,800 kW (11,801 hp) Cont. @ 25 kV AC; 3,880 kW (5,203 hp) @ 1.5 kV DC
- Gear ratio: 1 : 2.1894; World record: 1 : 2.012
- Electric systems: Overhead line: 25 kV 50 Hz AC; 1,500 V DC; 3,000 V DC (tri-current sets)
- Current collection: Pantograph
- UIC classification: Bo′Bo′+2′(2)′(2)′(2)′(2)′(2)′(2)′(2)′(2)′(2)′2′+Bo′Bo′
- Safety systems: TVM-430, KVB
- Track gauge: 1,435 mm (4 ft 8 1/2 in) standard gauge

The TGV Atlantique (TGV-A) is a class of high-speed trains used in France by SNCF; they were built by Alstom between 1988 and 1992, and were the second generation of TGV trains, following on from the TGV Sud-Est trainsets. The trains were named after the Ligne à Grande Vitesse Atlantique (lit. 'Atlantic high-speed line') that they were originally built for.

105 bi-current sets, numbered 301-405 were built. Entry into service began in 1989. They are 237.5 m (779 ft) long and 2.904 m (9 ft 6.3 in) wide. They weigh 444 t (437 long tons; 489 short tons), and are made up of two power cars and ten carriages with a total of 485 seats. They were built for a maximum speed of 300 km/h (186 mph) with 8,800 kW (11,801 hp) total power under 25 kV.

From 2015 onwards, many of these units have been scrapped with only 28 still in service in 2022. Most of the remaining fleet have been refurbished and mainly see service on slower trains between Paris and Bordeaux that use only a portion of the LGV Atlantique and LGV Sud Europe Atlantique. Fast through services on the route are now operated by the higher capacity TGV "Océane".

Modified unit 325 set the world speed record in 1990 on the new LGV before its opening. Modifications, such as improved aerodynamics, larger wheels (from 920 mm to 1090 mm) and improved braking were made to enable test run speeds of over 500 km/h (311 mph). Its gear ratio was changed from 51/27 × 51/44 ≈ 1 : 2.1894 to 51/27 × 46/49 ≈ 1 : 2.012. The set was reduced to two power cars and three carriages to improve the power-to-weight ratio, weighing 250 t (246 long tons; 276 short tons). The TGV Atlantique's world record was beaten on the 3 April 2007, by a TGV POS set on the LGV Est, which reached a top speed of 574.8 km/h (357.2 mph).

== Fleet details ==
Class	Number in service	Year built	Operator	Original units	Notes
Series 24000	28	1988 – 1992	SNCF	301-405	Bicurrent

== See also ==
- List of high speed trains
- AVE Class 100, a high-speed train in Spain based on the design of the TGV Atlantique
