= SNCF BB 9003-9004 =

French class of electric locomotives

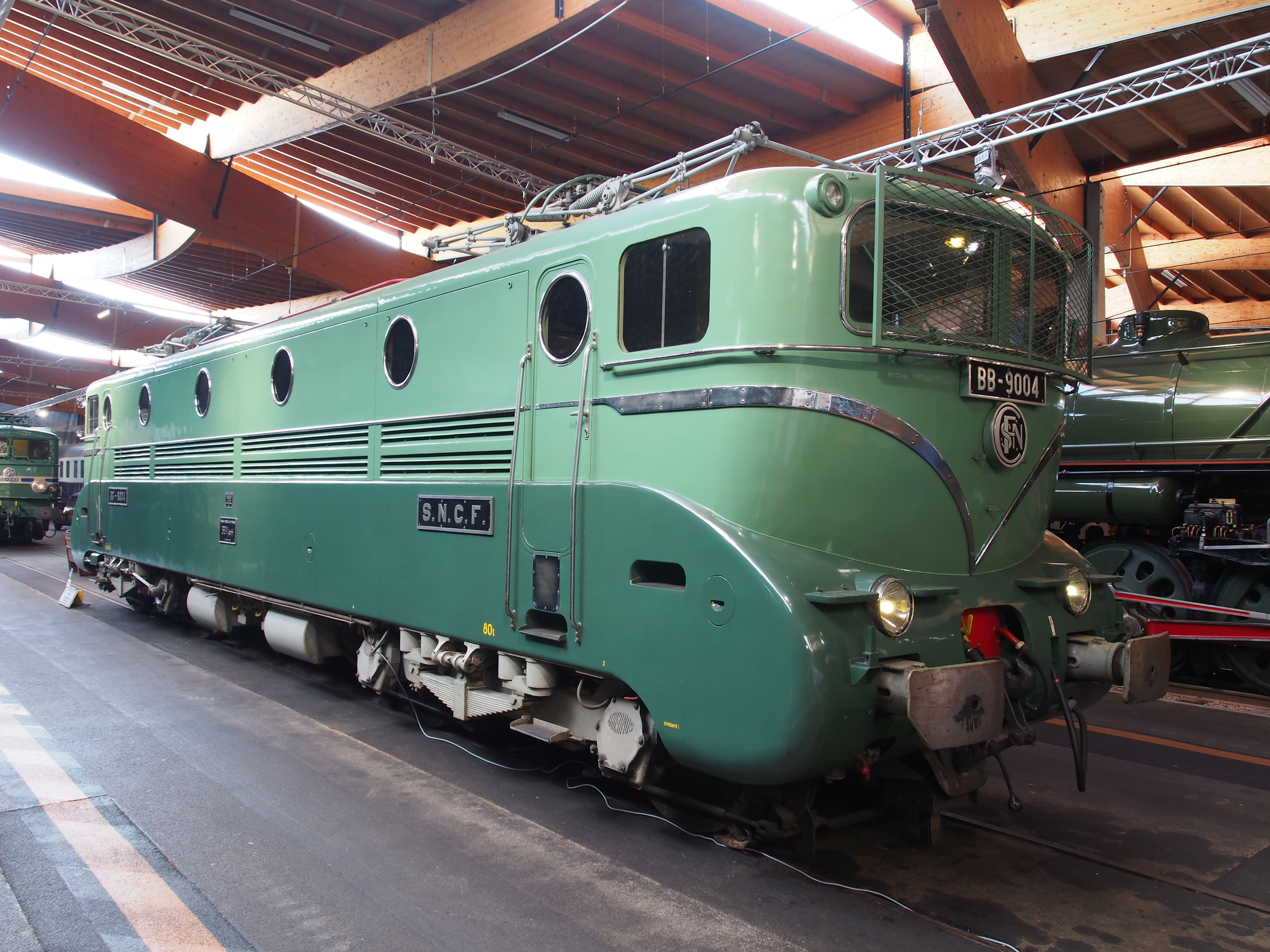
- BB 9004 at Cité du train
Type and origin
- Power type: Electric
- Builder: Jeumont-Schneider
- Build date: BB 9003: 1952, BB 9004: 1954
- Total produced: 2 units
Specifications
- Configuration
  - UIC: Bo'Bo'
- Gauge: 1,435 mm (4 ft 8 1/2 in)
- Length: 16.2 m (53 ft 1 3/4 in)
- Loco weight: BB 9003: 80 tonnes (79 long tons; 88 short tons), BB 9004: 83 tonnes (82 long tons; 91 short tons)
- Electric system/s: 1.5 kV DC
- Current pickup(s): 2× Pantograph
- Traction motors: BB 9003: 4 6F330 Oerlikon motors, BB 9004: 4 JS SW 4326 motors
Performance figures
- Maximum speed: 140 km/h (87 mph) In service
- Power output
  - Continuous: BB 9003: 3,180 kilowatts (4,260 hp), BB 9004: 2,980 kilowatts (4,000 hp)
Career
- Operators: SNCF
- Number in class: 2
- Numbers: BB 9003, BB 9004
- Nicknames: BB Jacquemin
- Delivered: 1952-1954
- Retired: 1973
- Preserved: BB 9004 Cité du train, with mechanicals from BB 9003

The SNCF BB 9003 and BB 9004 are French direct current electric locomotives with two bogies each having two driving axles. Built at the same time as SNCF BB 9001–9002, these four units were used to evaluate locomotives with total adhesion in the course of normal operation. They also served as prototypes that helped define the mechanical and electrical characteristics of future locomotives to be ordered in greater quantities.

== Design ==
Both BB 9003 and BB 9004 were electric locomotives using a Bo-Bo wheel configuration (meaning two bogies each with two powered axles). Both had twin pantographs and were powered by 1.5 kV DC overhead wires.

They differed slightly from one another, as BB 9003 used four Swiss-built Oerlikon 6F330 traction motors while BB 9004 used four French-built Jeumont-Schneider SW 4326 traction motors. BB 9003 was also lighter at 80 tonnes versus the 83 tonnes of BB 9004. BB 9003 was also more powerful than BB 9004 at 4,260 hp (3,180 kW) versus 4,000 hp (3,000 kW).

Their Jaquemin-designed bogies were later used in BB 9200-9300-9700, 12000–13000, 16000–16100, 20100, 25100-25150-25200 series locomotives, the body design (with common aesthetics) would be used in BB 9200-9300-9700, 9400, 16000–16100, 20100, 25100-25150-25200, 30000 series locomotives and Jeumont-Schneider traction equipment would be used in the BB 9200-9300-9700 series.

== Operational history ==
BB 9003 was built and delivered in 1952 and was the first French locomotive to be remote-controlled from the exterior of its train. BB 9004 was built and delivered in 1954 and later set a rail speed record of 331 km/h (206 mph) on 29 March 1955 on the Landes line between Facture and Morcenx, France, a day after SNCF 7107 did not exceed 325 km/h (202 mph), but the railway awarded the speed record to the credit of both machines in order to protect the commercial interests of the manufacturers. The event was widely broadcast in France and in other countries; an American television news crew sent an airplane to overfly the attempt and they were certain the train would derail before reaching 330 km/h. In fact, the airplane had trouble keeping up with the train. SNCF engineers were impressed at the performance; this attempt represented the beginning of research into using electricity for high-speed rail propulsion.

Both BB 9003 and 9004 ran for only 21 years, being used in revenue service until 1973. After withdrawal from service on January 24 1973, they were stored in Hausbergen, near Strasbourg. In 1979, BB 9003 was sent to the workshops at Arles and was restored and falsely numbered BB 9004 and it was donated to the Cité du Train in 1981. In 2003 it was displayed on the Champs Elysees in Paris as part of a major exhibition, L'exposition le Train Capitale. In 2005, "BB 9004" was run one final time on the Landes line in a special train along with CC 7107 as part of the commemoration of the 50th anniversary of the world speed record.

== Preservation ==
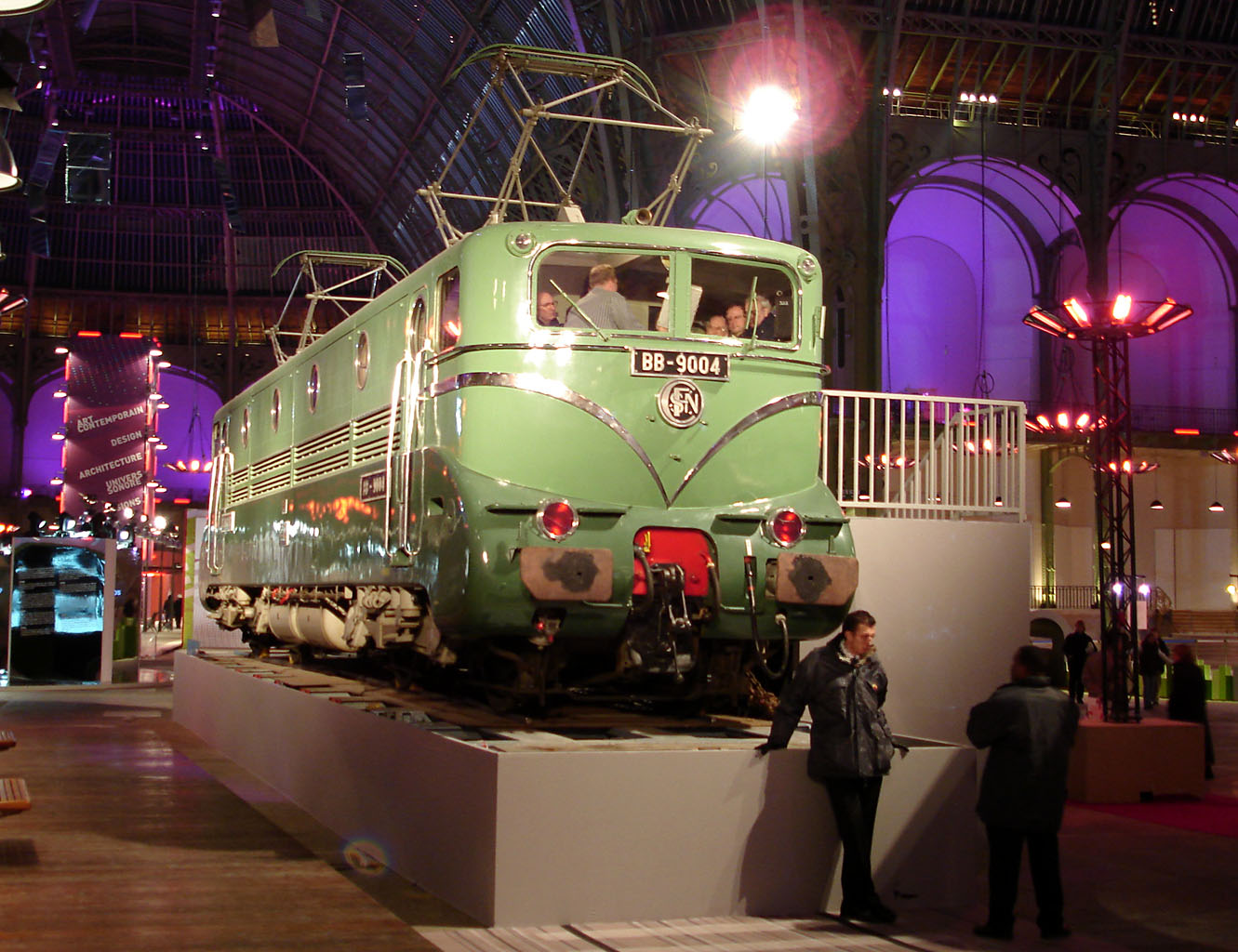
BB 9004 on display at the Grand Palais in Paris in December 2007

BB 9004 is preserved at Cité du Train, presented in a livery similar to one worn during the 1955 record winning run. The locomotive, as displayed, uses the body from BB 9003 while using the frame, running gear and internal components from BB 9004. This was done as the body of 9004 was in too poor condition to be preserved.

== Gallery ==
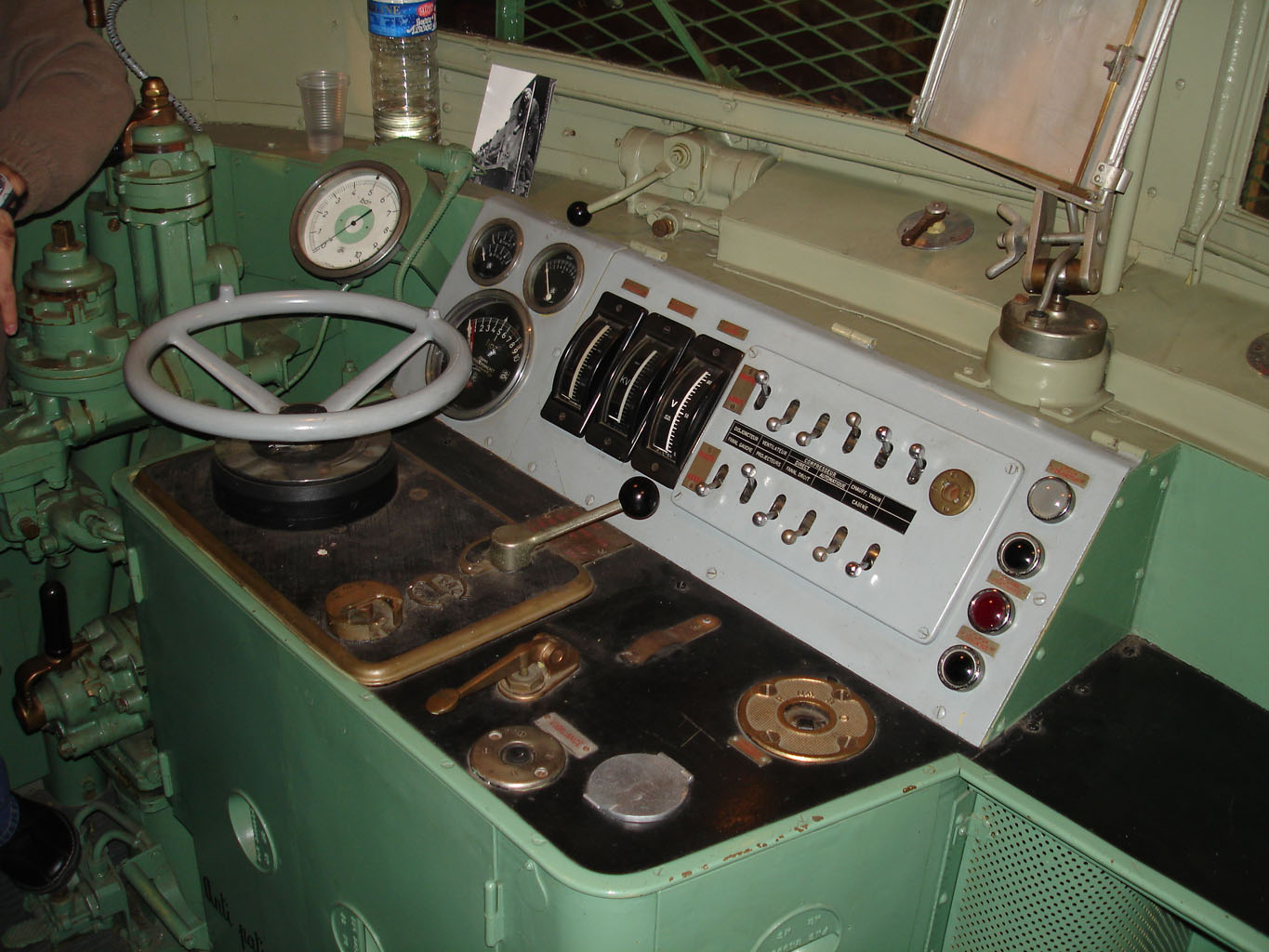
The driving stand of BB 9004

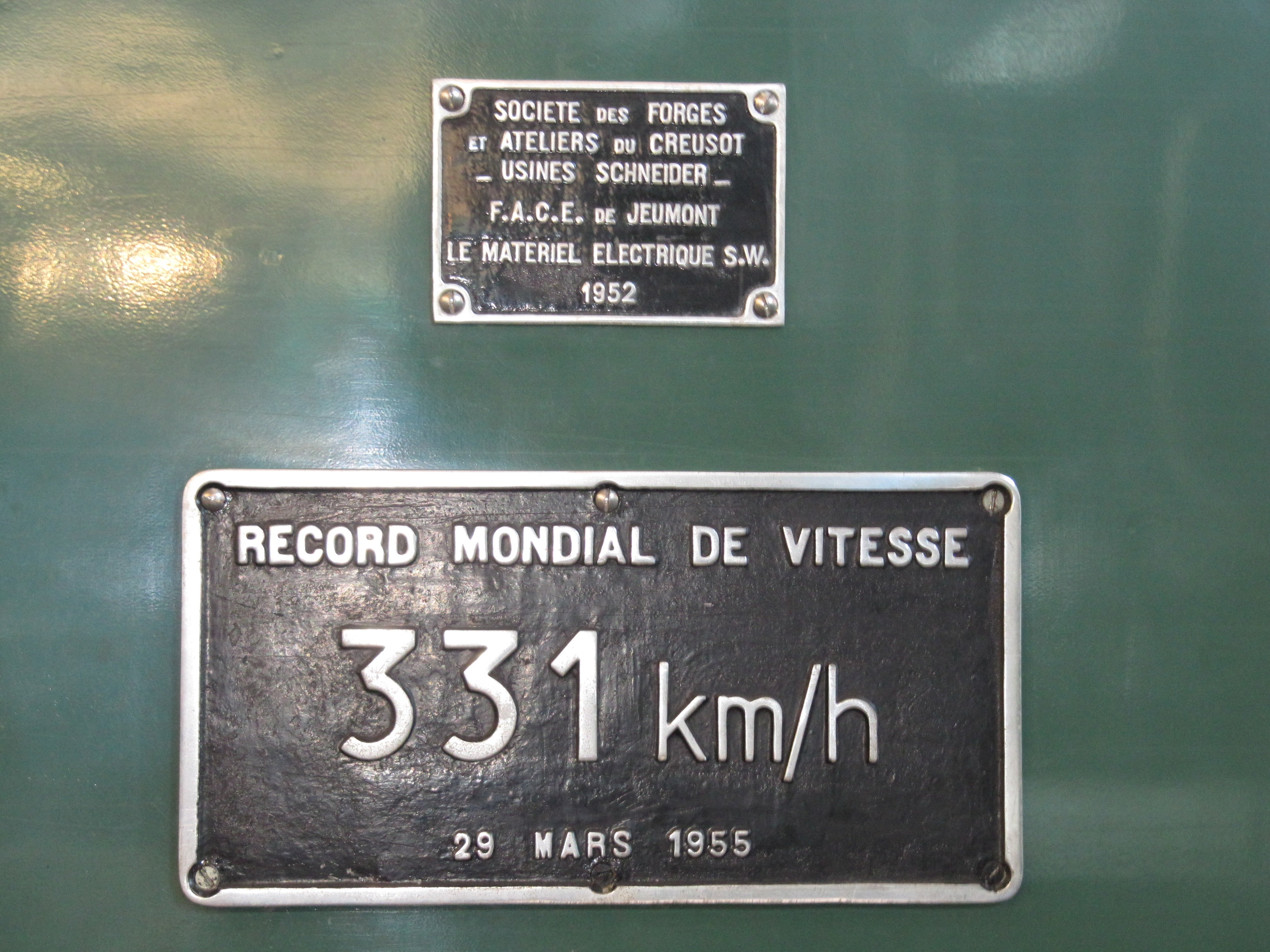
The builders plate of BB 9004 along with the record plaque
