= Krauss-Maffei Transurban =

Maglev automated guideway transit system

Krauss-Maffei's Transurban was a 12-passenger automated guideway transit (AGT) mass transit system based on a maglev guideway. Development started in 1970 as one of the many AGT and PRT projects that followed in the wake of the HUD reports of 1968. Its selection as the basis of the GO-Urban system in Toronto in 1973 made it well known in the industry; it would have been the basis of the first large-area AGT mass transit network in the world. Technical problems cropped up during the construction of the test track, and the sudden removal of funding by the West German government led to the project's cancellation in late 1974. The Ontario government completed development and installation of a non-maglev version, today known as the Bombardier Advanced Rapid Transit.

== History ==
=== AGT development ===
The publication of the HUD reports in the US in 1968 led to a wave of developments in the mass transit world. Dozens of companies around the world started development of AGT systems from large to small, hoping to cash in on what was predicted to be an enormous buildout of AGT systems. The majority of these systems were essentially smaller versions of rubber-wheeled metros, sometimes operating as a single car, but often in small trains. On the simpler end were systems like the Vought Airtrans and Bendix Dashaveyor, while more complex systems include the Alden staRRcar and Cabinentaxi which were true personal rapid transit systems (PRTs).

By the early 1970s many of these systems were developed to the point of being ready for deployment. In an effort to drum up business, the Urban Mass Transit Administration provided $1.5 million to four companies to bring their systems to the Transpo '72 show in Washington, DC where they were arranged as the central exhibit. Expecting numerous orders to follow, both the companies and Congress were dismayed to find a lack of interest on the part of city planners, for whom the systems had been designed and funded. This was generally blamed on the hesitations on the part of the mayors to deploy a system that was not already in use elsewhere.

=== Transurban ===
Krauss-Maffei (K-M) started development of the Transurban system in 1970. Full funding for a five-year development process was granted on 1 October 1971, part of a wider funding project by the German Ministry of Research and Technology. Many companies in Germany received funding to develop AGT systems, and maglev systems in particular. K-M won funding for both their AGT system, as well as their inter-city high-speed Transrapid maglev. K-M partnered with Standard Elektrik Lorenz to provide the automated control system.

Their system was based on attractive maglev (as opposed to repulsive) because they calculated it would require half as much power. This would require much more direct control over the suspension systems, however, as Eric Laithwaite famously noted. K-M also noted that maglev in general would have a wide array of advantages over traditional designs, including no contact with the running surface (eliminating wear), no noise or vibration and thus very little sound, low drag, and a low-profile vehicle because there was no "undercarriage".

SEL's control system allowed the Transurban cars to be operated singly or in five-car trains. This gave the Transurban system added flexibility; the very same system could be used on high or low-density routes, the only difference being the doors at the stations. The trains could automatically couple or uncouple in the stations, allowing the capacity to be adjusted "on the fly", or to allow individual cars to be pulled out of operation on demand, as opposed to removing the entire train from operation. Each car held 12 seated and 6 standing.

The system could also operate at different speeds, normally 30 mph but could go as high as 75 mph. This allowed the vehicles to be used on longer distance runs where the higher speeds were needed to reduce transit times. Passenger capacity was about the same at all speeds, headway was 10 seconds at 30 mph but was increased at higher speeds. Stations could be on-line or off-line, the later allowing "through trains" to pass by intermediate stations. Unlike true personal rapid transit systems, individual cars could not be switched out of trains, so individual point-to-point service was not available.

A 1,200 m test track was built to test the control system, using prototype vehicles on rubber wheels. The track was completed in 1973. This was followed by a 200 m test track for the maglev system.

=== Heidelberg ===
Early in development, K-M started negotiations with the city of Heidelberg to install a system in the downtown core. The city was worried about the visible impact of suspended systems among the many historic buildings, so K-M suggested moving the system to a tunnel. Since the system was much smaller than a traditional subway, it would cost less to install and require less earth moving under the buildings. The system was fairly small, with 3.6 km of track with 10 stations. It covered the downtown core only.

=== GO-Urban ===
When Toronto announced its GO-Urban system in 1972, there was enormous interest on the part of industry, who were all clamouring to win a contract and thereby be the first to be able to offer an operational system to future customers. Unlike the small Heidelberg system, GO-Urban featured three major lines covering the entire Toronto area as well as neighboring cities and providing service to the distant Malton Airport. Eighteen proposals were sent in for the Phase I selection process, including all of the major US developments, several European designs, and the Minitram system from Hawker-Siddeley Canada. Most of these were rubber-wheeled systems, but there were several hovercraft, along with the maglevs from Krauss-Maffei and the US ROMAG.

The initial selection left fourteen systems under consideration, then nine for the year-long detailed inspection. All but three were left after that process. Ford's ACT system was the least-advanced of the selectees, based on a 20-person rubber-wheeled vehicle. Its primary point of interest was that it used a single track for most rights of way, with smaller double-tracked areas allowing vehicles to pass each other. Hawker-Siddeley's entry also survived. It was based on smaller vehicles that switched onto separate lines at the stations, allowing other traffic to pass by at full speed. Like the Transurban, sets of cars could be connected and disconnected on the fly to form larger trains to increase capacity in denser areas.

Krauss-Maffei's system immediately caught the interest of the selection board. It had a number of advantages over the competition due to its use of a maglev and linear induction motor. The drive system had no physical contact between the train and "rails", so snow and ice would not affect its operations in the winter. Since it was expected to be almost silent in operation, the routes could be slotted into subdivisions close to houses (a major issue with most elevated railways).

A major part of the contract negotiations required the winning system to be built in Ontario. This was no problem for Hawker-Siddeley and Krauss-Maffei, who agreed to allow construction for any system sold to North America to be handled from Ontario. Ford could not meet this requirement, and withdrew from the contest, although there were also technical requirements the slower ACT could not meet. With only Hawker-Siddeley and Krauss-Maffei left, the 1 May 1973 announcement that the Transurban design had won the contest was unsurprising.

K-M had not yet built a full-scale Transurban test system, and agreed to help fund development of a test track in Ontario. Unlike most systems, which built test tracks at their industrial sites, Transurban's test system was intended to be built in downtown Toronto on the Exhibition Place (the Ex) fairgrounds. When testing was complete, the system would be used in production for moving passengers around the site, especially during the two weeks in the summer that the Canadian National Exhibition was in operation.

In the future, the test tracks could be connected to the Lakeshore Line of the GO-Urban network, allowing riders to transit from the downtown area directly to the fair, or to the recently completed Ontario Place grounds, which are difficult to access due to the 6-lane Lake Shore Boulevard separating Ontario Place from the Ex.

K-M and the Ontario government formed the Ontario Transportation Development Corporation (OTDC) to handle local sales into the North American market.

=== Cancellation ===
Construction on the test track started when the CNE closed for the 1974 season. Concrete pilings were poured and some of the support pillars mounted and everything was looking good for the promised opening in time for the 1975 CNE season. However, the test system in Germany failed when the vehicles rounded bends in the track, and fixes were not immediately obvious. Ontario provincial officials cancelled their visits while the West German government pondered the problem.

In November 1974, the German government announced a major shake-up of their maglev development funding. Krauss-Maffei's funding was dramatically reduced in favour of competing systems from MBB. The loss of funding was a severe blow to the project. Although K-M offered to move the entire project to Ontario if development funding was picked up there, no further money was forthcoming from the GO-Urban system, and development ended. During the period of negotiations, several technical issues had cropped up too. The system used a complex system of mechanical switches to move the trains from one track to another, and these proved to easily ice up in cold weather. Fixing this would require significant re-development.

Additionally, testing by US authorities found that the train was both noisy and had a harsh ride, quite the opposite of early predictions. The noise was due to the interaction of the linear motor and the plates of metal it reacted against (the "reaction rail"). The magnetic fields were so strong that they caused the plates to vibrate at 50 Hz (he standard European power frequency) which caused a loud humming sound that riders found distracting. The harsh ride was primarily blamed on the lack of a secondary passive suspension system, requiring the active system to continually adjust the distance over the track.

K-M offered to continue development of the system in Heidelberg, using a rubber-wheeled design in place of the maglev. These plans went nowhere.

=== ICTS ===
Given the technical problems remaining, the Ontario government decided to abandon the maglev concept. Instead, they took the basic train design, linear motor, SEL control system and other features of the Transurban, and redesigned it to run on conventional steel wheels. The result was the "ICTS" system. Announced in June 1975, the government used the existing shell of the OTDC to form the new Urban Transportation Development Corporation, in partnership with five industrial firms. Today known as the Bombardier Advanced Rapid Transit (ART), the ICTS is the basis for several mass transit systems around the world.

== Description ==
=== Vehicles ===
Like most AGT systems, the Transurban was based on a vehicle sized about the same as a large passenger van or small bus. The vehicle was essentially a large box, with windows on the side. The lack of a conventional suspension and wheels below the vehicle was its most notable feature, making it quite short compared to similar wheeled vehicles. The Transurban vehicles held 12 passengers seated, and another 6 to 8 standing. There were two automatic doors on either side.

=== Suspension and propulsion ===
The Transurban used separate suspension and propulsion systems. The suspension used attractive magnetic levitation, lifted on two upside-down T-shaped beams. Each held magnets for both lifting and switching, on the inside and outside of the T, respectively. Normally the cars ran with the T misaligned slightly inside of a similar structure attached to the track above it, which made the system self-centering. Switching was accomplished by pulling the vehicle sideways with the second set of magnets, before moving onto the new track. Skid pads on the track stopped the vehicle in the case of a power failure.

The motor was a one-sided LIM design, with an aluminum reaction rail positioned on the track between the two suspension rails. Power pickup was provided by two slipping brushes, like those on a conventional subway system. A subway can use the running rails as the ground, but the Transrapid had no contact with its rail, so it needed a second conductor. Brushes were positioned on both sides of the vehicle, to allow it to pick up from either side. It was powered by 600 VDC power, typical for mass transit systems, and drew 50 kW at 50 mph.

=== Control ===
Almost as complex as the vehicle was the automated system to control the network in operation. For signalling, the system used dual redundant induction loops, one on each side of the LIM reaction plate. Magnets on the bottom of the vehicles relayed information about the vehicle location and speed, which was received at the central control station.

The control station received this information to provide communication-based train control based on moving blocks. The control center used the same loops to send control signals to the cars, as well as announcements in emergency situations.

The control center also featured a widespread closed-circuit-television system, to provide security at stations and locations along the track. This required much higher bandwidth than the inductive loop could provide, and was handled separately.

Although the Transurban system was never built in a production setting, SEL's control system became widespread. Now better known as SelTrac, the system was licensed by Alcatel for deployment in Canada on the ICTS. ICTS's initial installs had problems, but they were solved and the system quickly proved itself. It was then adopted by other Canadian train operators, notably CP Rail, as well as many other AGT systems. Today it is used for hundreds of AGT and heavy rail systems around the world.

== See also ==
- Maglev
- Transrapid
- High Speed Surface Transport
- ROMAG
- Line S1 (Beijing Subway)
