= Minitram =

Minitram was an automated guideway transit system studied by the Transport and Road Research Laboratory (TRRL), part of the UK Department of the Environment's Ministry of Transport. The system was based on small, completely automated tram-like vehicles of about 25 passengers that could be connected together into three-car trains to increase capacity. Proposed designs were submitted by Hawker Siddeley Dynamics (HSD) and EASAMS (part of GEC). HSD's system used rubber wheels and EASAMS' steerable steel ones, but the projects were otherwise similar and notably shared a linear motor for propulsion and most braking. A series of failed sales efforts in the UK and to the GO-Urban system in Toronto, combined with decreased government spending in the 1970s, led to the concept being abandoned.

== Background ==
During the 1960s a number of influential studies were published on the nature and future of mass transit systems. Primary among these were a series of reports from the US known collectively as the HUD reports. The HUD reports concluded that existing forms of transit could not compete with the convenience of car driving. If such systems were to be successful, they would need to offer tighter schedules to reduce waiting, smaller cars with fewer passengers, and more direct routing to eliminate intermediate stops. The result was the personal rapid transit concept, or PRT.

The reports suggested the only way to offer all of these features would be to use extensive automation. Systems were imagined with driverless vehicles with sizes anywhere from three to 20 passengers, normally travelling at fixed speeds to reduce timing complexity, with stations built "offline" on sidings to allow traffic to bypass intermediate stops. Even with relatively slow cruise speeds, end-to-end trip times would be better than existing mass transit systems, and especially cars.

The publication of the HUD reports, along with considerable development funding by the US Congress, led to major development efforts in most of the industrialized countries around the world. Four major developments were underway in the US, two in France, two in Germany, and two in Japan. The UK initially entered the fray with early studies on the Cabtrack system, but a political firestorm followed the publication of proposed station designs and the concept was abandoned.

=== Minitram ===
Out of the ashes of the Cabtrack debacle came Minitram, designed to be technically simpler than Cabtrack, using on-line stations and scheduling and routing much more similar to conventional metro systems. The concept was no longer along the lines of the PRT systems, and was essentially a small metro system, with small 20 to 25-passenger cars that could automatically link together to reduce headway and thereby increase route capacity. This "automatic platooning" concept also allowed multiple routes in low-volume areas on the outskirts of the network to all feed into a small number of high-volume routes in the downtown cores. This was a topic of some research at the time, notably the French Aramis project.

Initial studies by the TRRL demonstrated route capacities greater than Cabtrack, less construction for the same capacity, and better fare box returns. The studies examined vehicles with 14 to 20 passengers running on elevated tracks with 30 second minimum headways, maximum speeds of 55 km/h and average speeds including stops of 40 km/h. Several potential development sites were considered, including London's Docklands area and between Croydon and New Addington.

The most serious study was for a line in Sheffield which connected the city's spread-out shopping areas. A complete report on the route was published in 1974 by Robert Matthew Johnson-Marshall, calling for a total of 2.5 km of double-track forming roughly a U shape with nine stations. Peak capacity with three-car trains was 5,400 passengers per hour, reducing to as little as 180 per hour when running single cars at off-peak times with 5 minute headways. The government also provided some money to British Rail to study a maglev solution along the same routes.

On 22 May 1975 the Minister for Transport cancelled the system. He argued that the system was not ready for deployment, and the cancellation was final. His argument for final cancellation was to allow the city to consider other transportation options. This eventually took the form of the existing Sheffield Supertram system, whose downtown route from City Hall to Park Grange follows the original Minitram route.

The only other interest expressed in the Minitram system was by the GO-Urban development for Toronto. Hawker Siddeley Canada was already a major provider of equipment for Ontario, including both the H-series cars for the Toronto Transit Commission's subway system and the newly developed BiLevel Coach for GO Transit's regional rail networks. After the initial downselect from 18 different proposals, the project selected the Ford ACT, Hawker's version of Minitram, and the Krauss-Maffei Transurban. Ford withdrew their system from the contest, leaving the two platooning systems (Transurban could operate in three-car trains) in the running. Given the high-tech goals of the project, it was considered a foregone conclusion that the Transurban would win the contest, as announced on 1 May 1973.
