= Ultra (personal rapid transit) =

Personal rapid transit system

Coordinates: 51.479287°N 0.487687°W

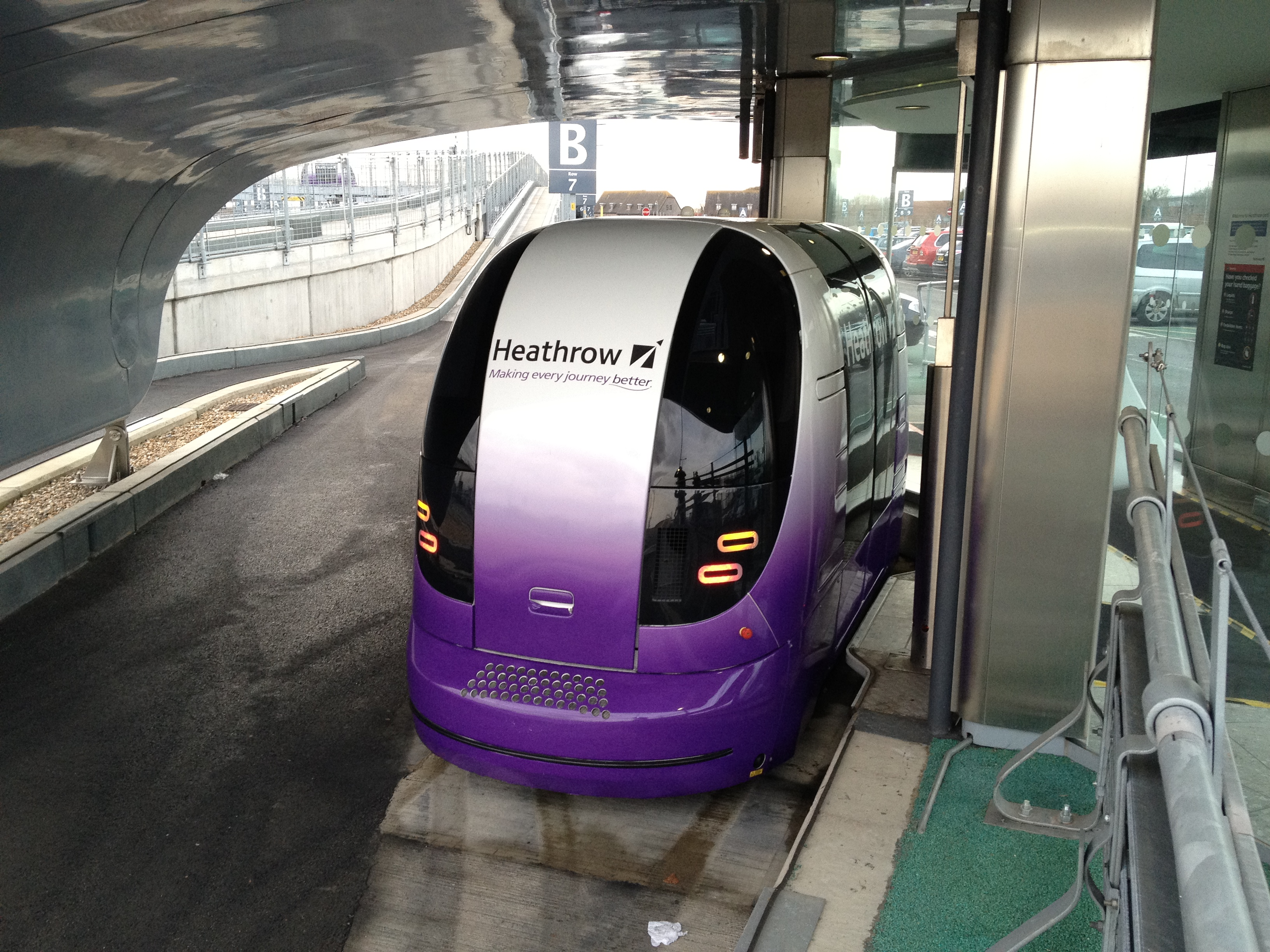
An Ultra Pod at Heathrow Airport in 2012

Ultra (a term formed from the first letters of the words in the phrase "urban light transit") is a personal rapid transit podcar system developed by the British engineering company Ultra Global PRT (formerly Advanced Transport Systems).

The only publicly operating Ultra pod system opened at Heathrow Airport in London in May 2011 and is referred to as the Heathrow pod system. It consists of 21 vehicles operating on a 3.9-kilometre (2.4 mi) route connecting Terminal 5 to its business passenger car park, just north of the airport.

To reduce construction costs, Ultra largely uses off-the-shelf technologies, such as rubber tyres running on an open guideway. The approach has resulted in a system that Ultra believes to be economical: the company reports that the total cost (vehicles, infrastructure, and control systems) is between £3 million and £5 million per kilometre (0.62 miles) of guideway. However, the Heathrow deployment cost £30 million for 3.8 kilometres (2.4 mi) of guideway.

== Inception ==
The system was originally designed by Martin Lowson and his design team; Lowson had put £10 million into the project. He formed Advanced Transport Systems (ATS) in Cardiff to develop the system, and the site was later the location of its test track. Ultra has twice been awarded funding from the UK National Endowment for Science, Technology and the Arts (NESTA). Much of the original research on Ultra was done by the Aerospace Engineering department at the University of Bristol in the 1990s. The company renamed itself "Ultra PRT Limited", because of its primary business, and moved its corporate headquarters to Bristol.

== Background ==
=== Past PRT designs ===
Personal rapid transit was originally developed in the 1950s as a response to the need to move commuters in areas with densities too low to pay for the construction of a conventional metro system. Using automated guidance allowed headways to be shortened, even to a few seconds. That increases the route capacity, allowing the vehicles to become much smaller but still carry the same passenger load in a given time. Smaller vehicles in turn would require simpler "tracks" and smaller stations, which lowered capital costs. Smaller towns and cities that could never hope to fund a conventional mass transit system could afford PRT, and the concept generated intense interest.

Numerous PRT systems were designed in the late 1960s and early 1970s, many as a result of the publication of the highly-influential HUD reports. In general, the systems intended to use small four-to-six-passenger vehicles, but most evolved to larger designs over time (see Alden staRRcar). As they did so, vehicles and tracks grew heavier, capital costs rose, and interest dropped. In the end, only one production PRT system was built, the Morgantown, W.Va PRT in 1975, a government-funded demonstration system to prove the concept. Originally derided as a white elephant, the Morgantown system has since proven itself both reliable and relatively low cost.

=== Ultra ===
In the time since the Morgantown system was installed in 1975, general technological improvements have led to a number of ways to lower the cost of a PRT system. One of the simplest but most profound way was the development of more efficient, reliable and quick-charging battery systems. Older PRT systems used electricity fed from track-side conductors like a conventional metro, but they can be eliminated in favour of batteries that quickly charge up at stations or small charging strips along the route. Another change is the moving of the guidance logic from centralised computers to on-board systems of dramatically improved performance, allowing the vehicles to steer and switch themselves between routes on their own. That eliminates the need for a track-mounted guiderail able to steer the vehicle (see, for instance, the Ford ACT). Together, the changes mean the vehicle no longer needs strong mechanical contact with the guideway, which can be dramatically reduced in complexity.

In the case of Ultra, the guideway can consist of as little as two parallel rows of concrete barriers, similar to the bumpers found in a car park. The vehicle uses them for fine guidance only; it is able to steer itself around curves by following the barriers passively. No "switching" is required on the track, as the vehicles can make their own turns between routes based on an internal map. Since the vehicles are battery-powered, there is no need for electrification along the track: the vehicles recharge when they are parked at the stations. As a result, the trackway is similar in complexity to a conventional road surface, a light-duty one as the vehicles will not vary in weight to the extent of a tractor-trailer. Even the stations are greatly simplified; in the case of ground-level tracks, the lack of any substantial infrastructure means that the vehicles can stop at any kerb. Stations at Heathrow resemble a car park with diagonal slots, with a rain shield similar to the awnings at a petrol station.

As part of the development of the first commercial system at Heathrow Airport, in 2005 the owner of the airport, BAA Airports Ltd, purchased 25% of the company. Following its successful launch, there are now plans to extend it to the rest of the airport and even to the nearest town of Staines-upon-Thames, which is home to many of the airport's staff.

== Description ==
=== Vehicles ===
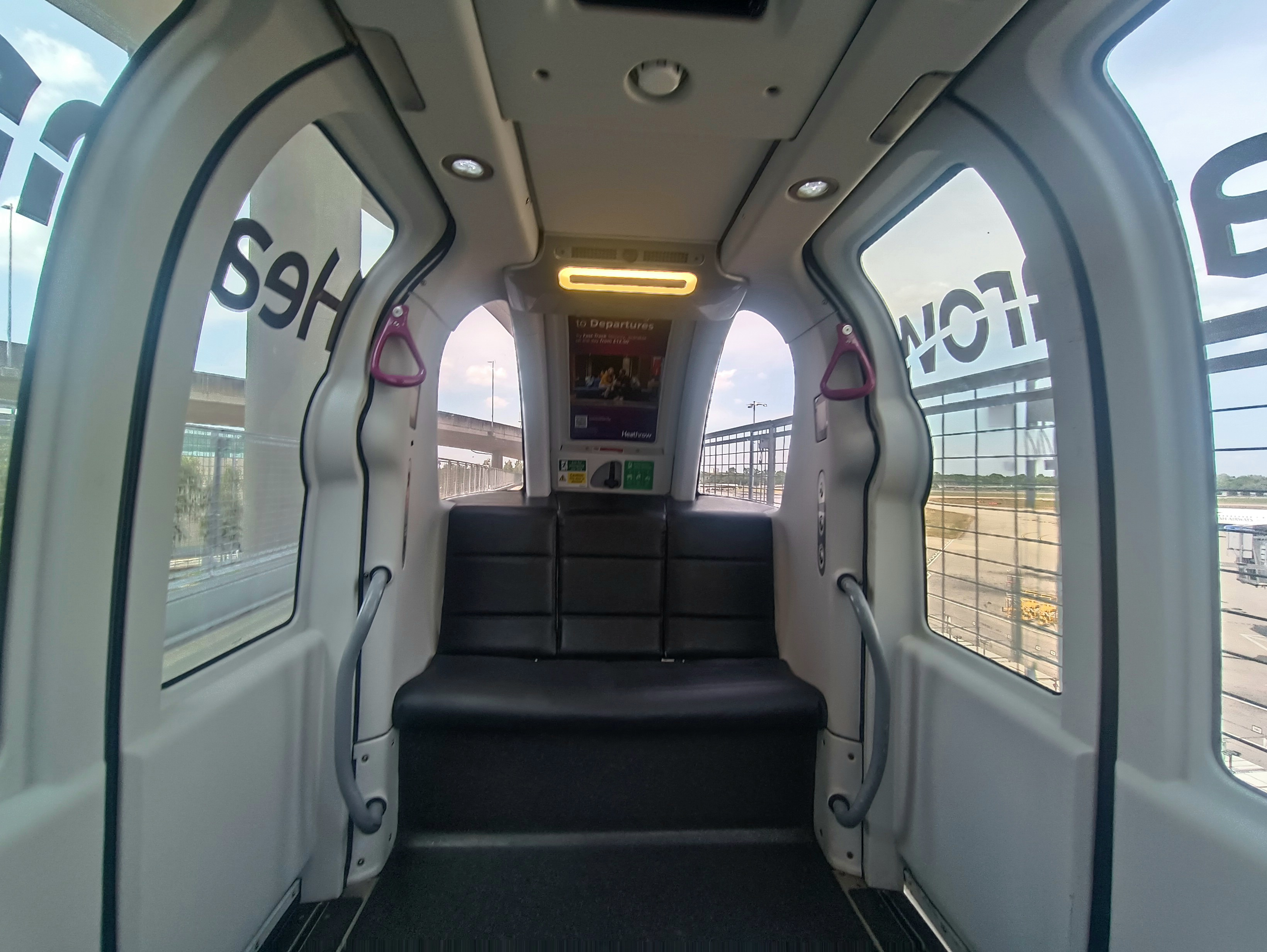
The interior of a Heathrow Pod

With a length of 3.7 metres (12 ft 2 in), a width of 1.5 metres (4 ft 11 in), a height of 1.8 metres (5 ft 11 in) and a gross weight of 1,300 kilograms (2,900 lb), the electric-powered vehicles can carry up to five passengers and a 500 kilograms (1,100 lb) payload and are designed to travel at 40 kilometres per hour (25 mph) at gradients of up to 20%, but the company has suggested limiting operating routes to 10% gradients to improve passenger comfort. The vehicles can accommodate wheelchairs, shopping trolleys and other luggage, in addition to the passengers.

Each pod is powered by four car batteries, giving an average 2 kW and adding 8% to the gross weight of the vehicle. Other specifications include a 5 metres (16 ft) turning radius, an energy requirement of 0.55 MJ per passenger-kilometre, and running noise levels of 35 dBA at 21.6 kilometres per hour (13.4 mph), as measured at a distance of 10 metres (33 ft).

The company has also developed designs for a freight version. It has the same external appearance as the passenger version, but its entire internal space is adapted to host a cargo capsule. They can be valuable in airport environments, where the network can be used to haul small freight.

=== Control technology ===
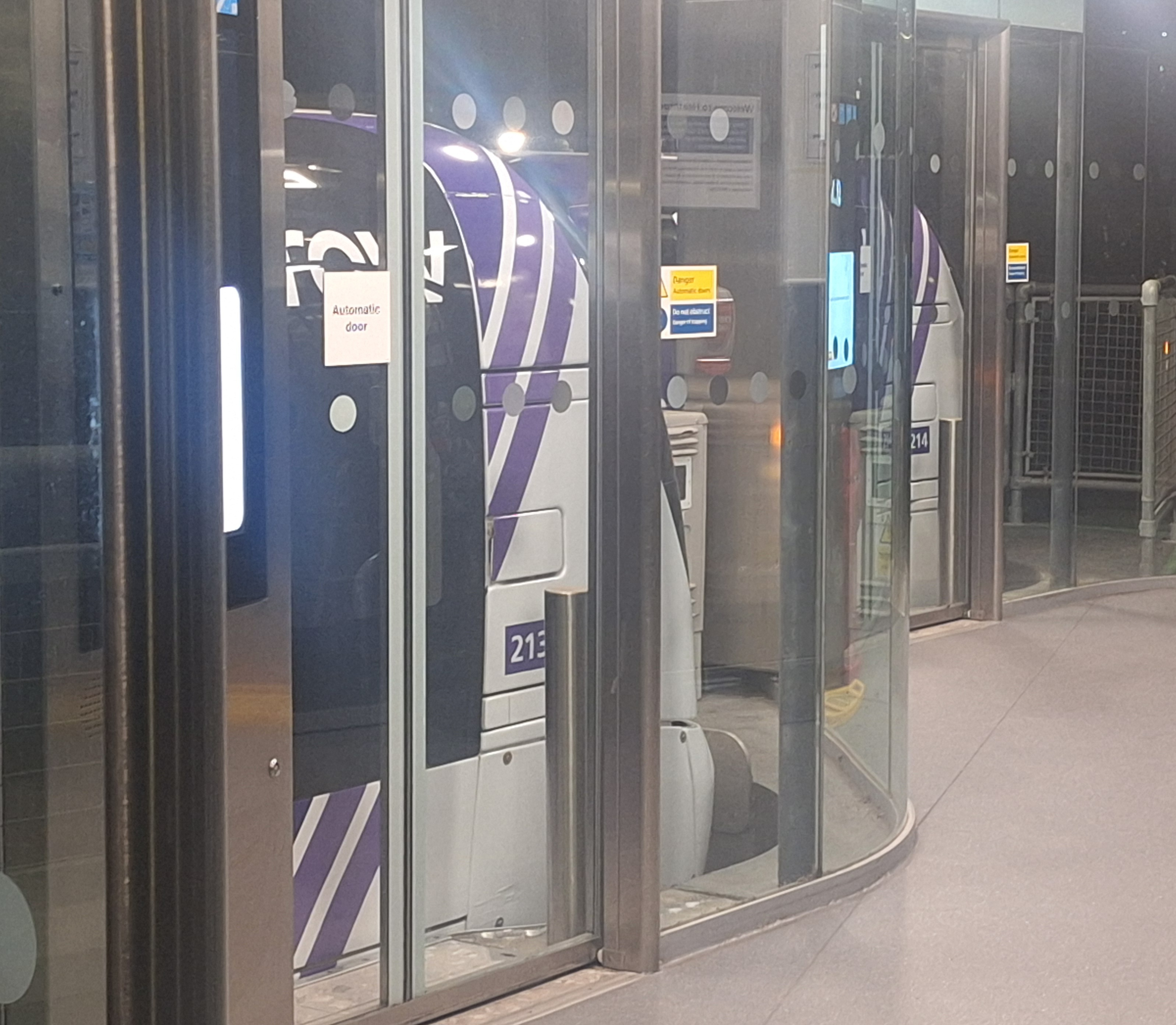
Heathrow pods at Pod Parking station A in 2025

According to Ultra, its control system has three separate levels of operation, with the following features:

==== Central synchronous control ====
- Immediately allocates the passenger a vehicle
- Instructs the vehicle to follow a set path and timing to reach the destination
- Ensures that there is no interaction between vehicles
- Manages empty vehicles

==== Autonomous vehicle control ====
- Receives instruction from central synchronous control
- Navigates the pod to its destination by continuously using lasers to verify vehicle position and heading

==== Automatic vehicle protection system ====
- Based on fixed block signalling systems like railways
- Inductive loops set into the guideway interact with sensors on the vehicle
- Each vehicle must be receiving a constant "proceed" signal to move
- The signal is inhibited in an area directly behind each pod for automatically halting others that are approaching; that provides a failsafe system that is independent of other layers of control

=== Test track ===
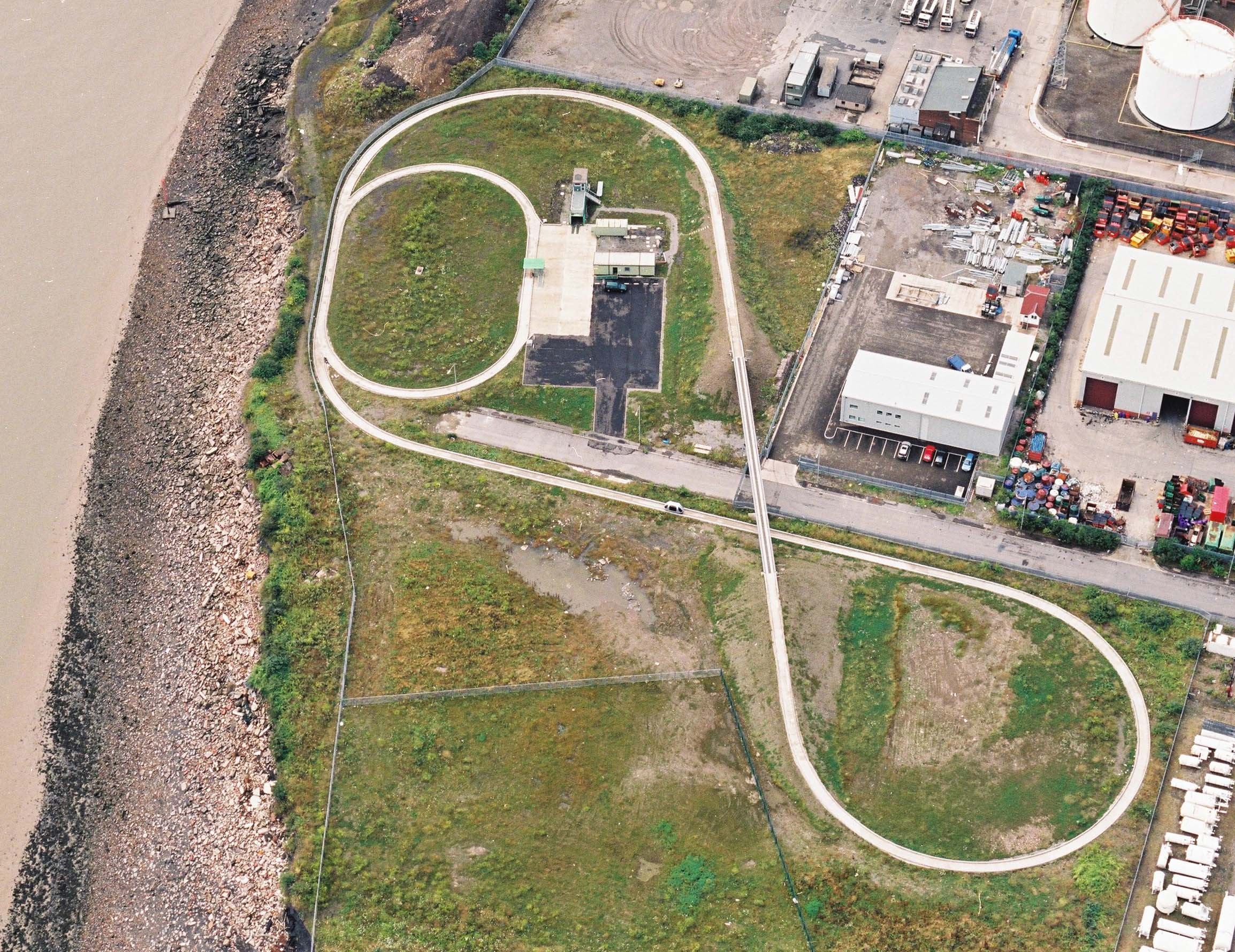
The Ultra PRT test track in Cardiff

The 1 kilometre (0.62 mi) test track in Cardiff was launched in January 2002. The $4 million funding for the test track came from various sources in the United Kingdom government. One electric vehicle was demonstrated running at speeds up to 25 miles per hour (40 km/h). Accurate stopping was demonstrated, and the vehicle ascended and descended a steep gradient. A single, rudimentary ground level station was shown.

Most of the test track guideway is at ground level. It is stated that in a commercial application, 90% or more of the guideway might have to be elevated. The elevated guideway is about 1.5 metres (4 ft 11 in) wide. According to a study of a hypothetical city-based installation, consisting of 19.8 kilometres (12.3 mi) of guideway (89% elevated), the total cost of track and associated civil engineering works is estimated to be £2.9 million per kilometre ($8.7 million/mi). Per-station costs were estimated to be £0.48 million ($0.89 million). Vehicle costs were not considered in the study.

== Deployments ==
=== Heathrow Terminal 5 ===
Heathrow Pod
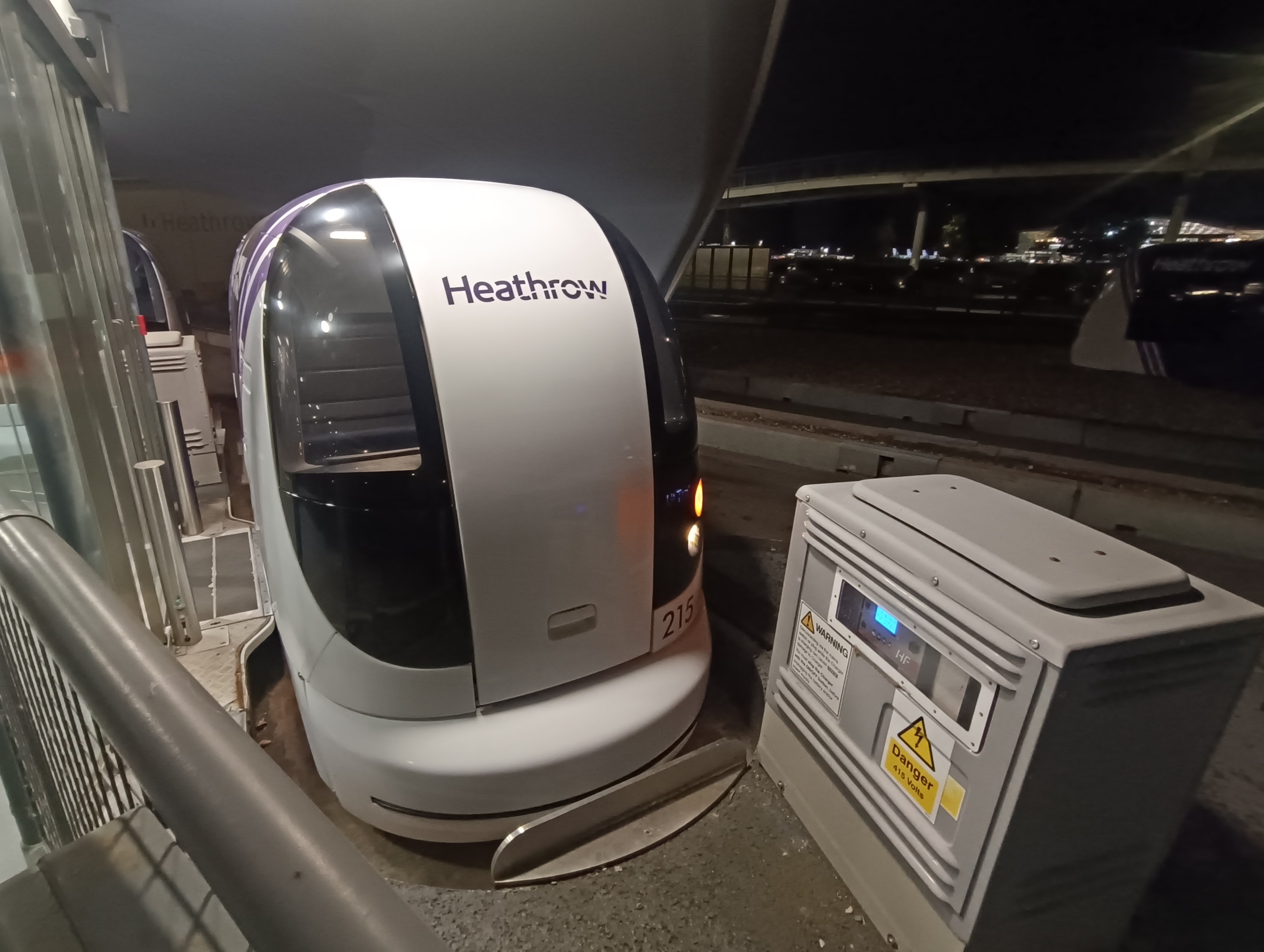

Operation
- Number of vehicles: 21

Technical
- System length: 3.8 km (2.4 mi)

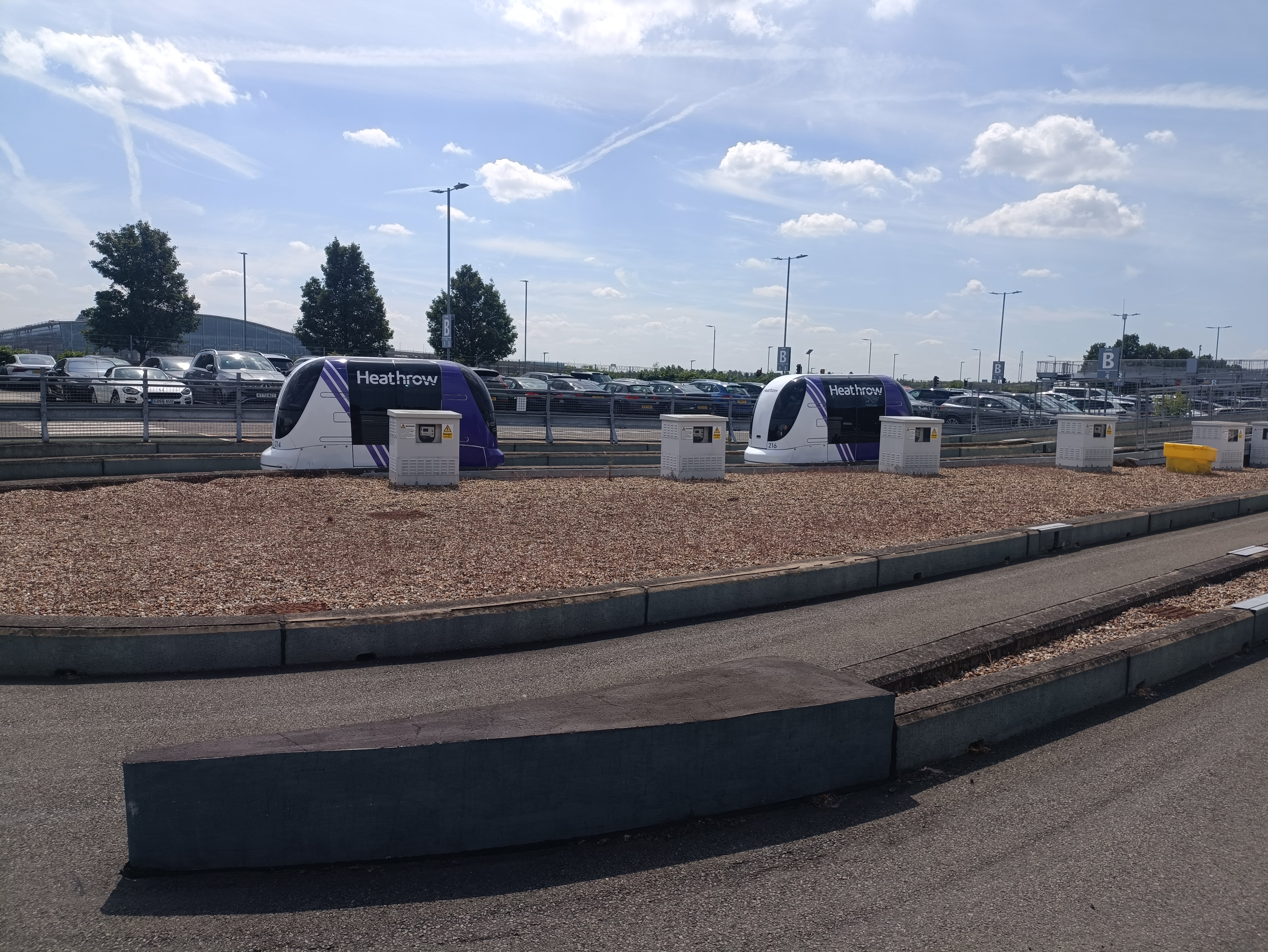
Pod lay-by at Parking B in 2025

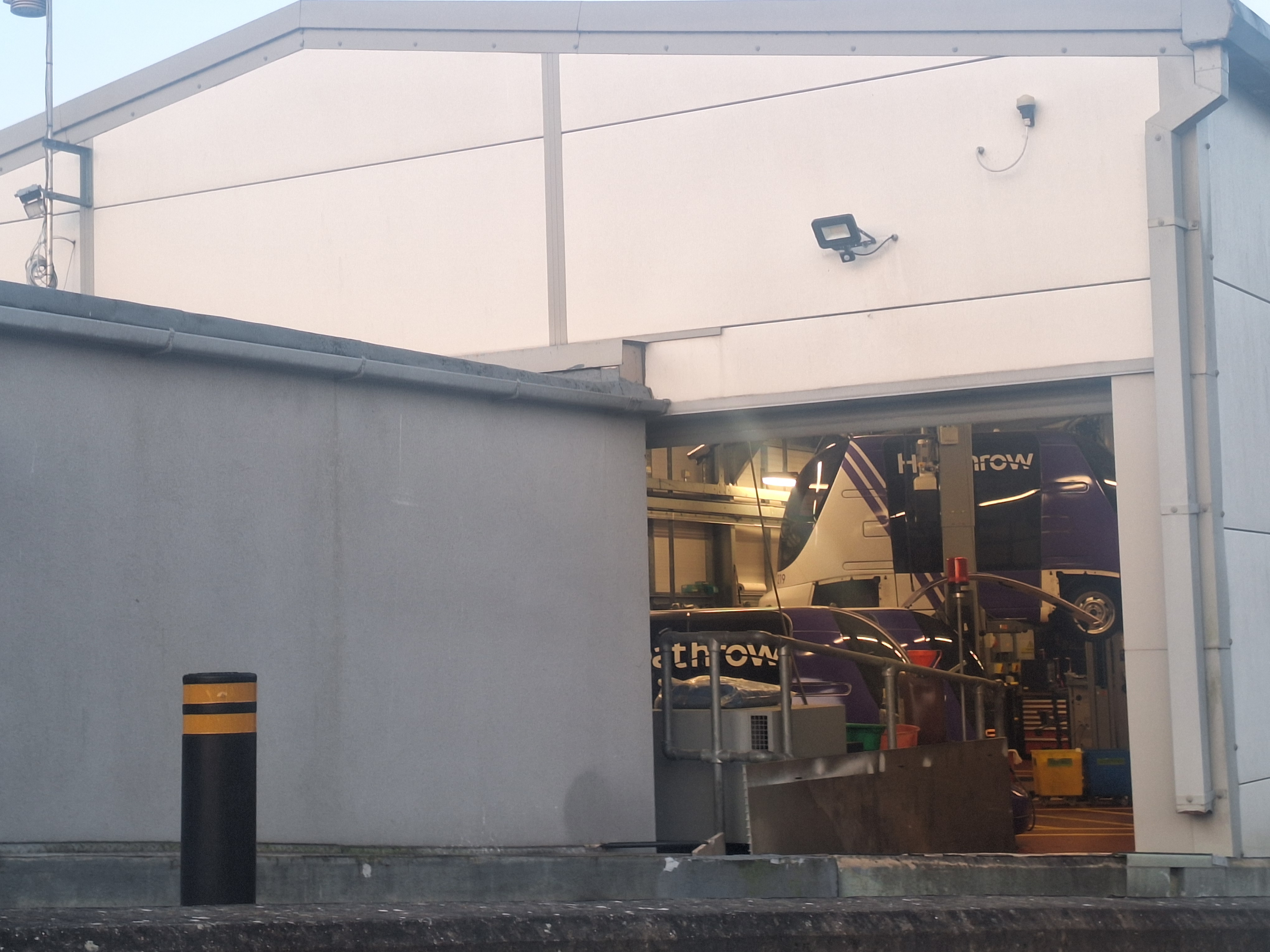
One of the Heathrow pod maintenance facilities at Pod Parking station A, with the other one at Terminal 5

The first system began passenger trials at Heathrow Terminal 5, in October 2010, and it opened for full passenger service 22 hours a day, 7 days a week, in May 2011. Operational statistics in May 2012 demonstrate more than 99% reliability and an average passenger wait time over the year of 10 seconds. Ultra has achieved a number of awards from the London Transport Awards and the British Parking Awards.

It connects Heathrow Terminal 5 to its business passenger car park, just north of the airport, by a 3.9-kilometre (2.4 mi) line built on behalf of Heathrow Airport Holdings, the airport's owner and operator. The system cost £30 million to develop.

Construction of the guideway was completed in October 2008. The line is largely elevated, but it includes a ground-level section, where the route passes under the approach to the airport's northern runway. The three stations, with two pod stations and one station within the car park at Terminal 5, were designed by Gebler Tooth Architects, along with the touchscreen interface for passengers to select their destination on their journey. Following various trials, including some that used airport staff as test passengers, the line opened to the public in May 2011 as a passenger trial. Subsequently, it was made fully operational, and the bus service between the business car park and Terminal 5 was discontinued. The pods use 50% less energy than a bus and run 22 hours per day. Unlike nearly all UK road and rail traffic, which drives on the left, the PRT system drives on the right. As of May 2013, the system passed the 600,000th-passenger milestone.

The developers expected that users will wait an average of around 12 seconds, with 95% of passengers waiting for less than 1 minute for their private pod, which will travel at up to 25 miles per hour (40 km/h).

As of May 2018 the 21 pods carry upwards of 1,000 travellers per day.

=== Chengdu Tianfu International Airport, China (awaiting commissioning) ===
In 2018, it was announced that a PRT system would be installed at the new Chengdu Tianfu International Airport in Chengdu. The system will include 6 miles (9.7 km) of guideway, 4 stations, 22 pods and will connect a remote parking area to the two terminal buildings. The airport opened on 27 June 2021. As of February 2025 there are no reports the PRT has commenced operation.

== Proposals ==
=== Jewar International Airport, India (proposed) ===
In March 2021, it was announced that a PRT system will be installed from the proposed film city in Noida to the upcoming Jewar International Airport in Jewar.

=== Ajman City, United Arab Emirates (proposed, signed contract) ===
In July 2017 Ultra-Fairwood (a joint venture) announced that it had signed a contract with the Government of Ajman for the construction of a system in Ajman City. The proposed network will include 120 kilometres (75 mi) of track overall, including a total route length of 76 kilometres (47 mi), covering 115 stations. These will be served by a fleet of 1,745 vehicles, offering an expected system capacity of 1.64 million passenger trips per day. The system will comprise two overlapping networks. The first of which is a PRT system with six seat vehicles running on elevated guideways with elevated stations. The second is a Group Rapid Transit (GRT) with thirty seat vehicles running mainly at grade with ground level stations. The vehicles will be produced at a factory in India. The total value of the project is US$881 million with the system cost, supplied by Ultra-Fairwood worth US$723 million.

=== Gurugram, India (proposal) ===
In March 2010, the government of Haryana said that it was looking into a proposal to deploy Ultra for rapid commuter transport in the city of Gurugram. The city is looking at over 10 to 12 individual routes to cover a total distance of approximately 100 kilometres (62 mi).

In July 2012, it was reported that the Chief Minister of Haryana had ordered officials to "complete all the necessary formalities in the next three months and begin work on the project". In October 2016, Indian Transport Minister Nitin Gadkari said four competing technical proposals had been received, and the system was still subject to approval and financial bidding.

In January 2017, ULTra was one of three companies – along with SkyTran and Metrino – approved to build a test track evaluate PRT technology for potential deployment in Gurugram and Bengaluru. The companies will need to fund the construction themselves. As of August 2017, Metrino has withdrawn from the competition and construction has not commenced, but the trial is still set to proceed.

=== Heathrow New PRT (deferred proposal) ===
In May 2013, Heathrow Airport Limited announced, as part of its draft five-year (2014–2019) master plan that it intended to use the PRT system to connect Terminal 2 and Terminal 3 to their respective business car parks. The proposal was not included in the final plan because of spending priority being given to other capital projects, and has been deferred.

There were also plans to extend the PRT throughout the airport, and to nearby hotels by using 400 pods.

=== Amritsar, India (failed proposal) ===
In December 2011, Ultra-Fairwood (a joint venture) announced a plan to build an 8-kilometre (5.0 mi) elevated guideway in a Y-shaped network in Amritsar, India, serving seven stations, with over 200 pods. The network would connect the railway station, the bus station and the Golden Temple. Initial projections were for up to 100,000 passengers per day from 4:00 a.m. to midnight that would carry 35% of the visitors to the Golden Temple. The system was projected to be completed by 2014 with private financing on a 'Build, Own, Operate, Transfer' (BOOT) basis.

The unsolicited bid was announced by the local government as set to proceed, and a foundation stone was laid. The proposed route received objections from some businesses, particularly in the Hall Bazaar and the route was then changed, with the Katra Jaimal Singh area dropped from the line, between the railway station and the temple.

In March 2013, the government of Punjab announced that it would open the project to competitive tendering with the Swiss challenge method. Ultra-Fairwood was one of three suppliers that was expected to be bidding. Reports indicate the government is due to finalise the bid by the end of June 2013.

In June 2014, it was scrapped to be replaced by a cheaper rapid bus transit system.

== Sources ==
- Isaiah Litvak and Christopher Maule, "The Light-Rapid Comfortable (LRC) Train and the Intermediate Capacity Transit System (ICTS): Two Case Studies of Innovation in the Urban Transportation Equipment Manufacturing Industry", University of Toronto/York University Joint Program in Transportation, 1982
