= Transpo =

Transpo may refer to:

- OC Transpo, transit service of the City of Ottawa, Ontario, Canada
- South Bend Transpo, public bus system of South Bend, Indiana, United States
- Transpo 72, a transportation exposition held at Dulles International Airport, Virginia in 1972
