= ROMAG =

Personal rapid transit system

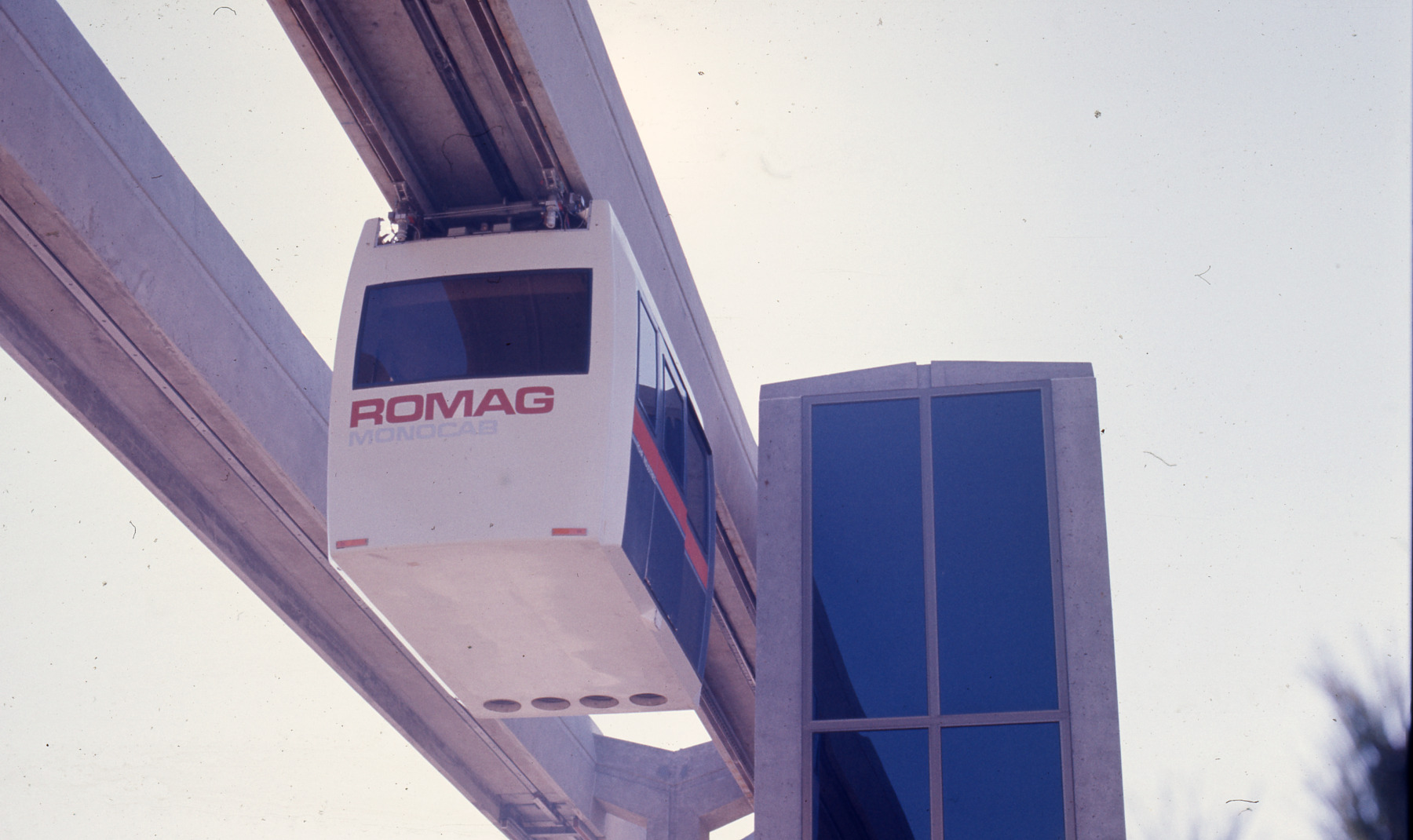
ROMAG Monocab in 1975

ROMAG was a personal rapid transit (PRT) system produced by the American company Rohr, Inc. It featured a linear induction motor that was arranged to provide both traction and suspension in a magnetic levitation system.

ROMAG was developed from a wheeled system known as Monocab, originally designed by Edward Haltom and built to the extent of a test track by Vero Inc. in 1969. Rohr bought the design from Vero and converted it to the ROMAG, opening their own test track at their Chula Vista, California, plants in 1971. The Vero test system was later used as a display unit at Transpo '72.

ROMAG was considered for use in Toronto's GO-Urban project, but lost to the very similar Krauss-Maffei Transurban. It was then selected for a deployment in Las Vegas, but funding fell through and planning stopped. Rohr abandoned development after the 1973–1974 stock market crash erased half of their corporate value and they returned to their core aviation interests. Boeing Vertol purchased the design from Rohr in 1978, but no deployments were ever carried out.

== History ==
=== Monocab ===
Monocab is one of the earliest PRT designs, dating from 1953. It was originally developed by Edward Haltom who was studying monorail systems. Haltom noticed that the time to start and stop a conventional large monorail train, like those of the Wuppertal Schwebebahn, meant that a single line could only support between 20 and 40 vehicles an hour. In order to get reasonable passenger movements on such a system, the trains had to be large enough to carry hundreds of passengers (see headway for a general discussion). This, in turn, demanded large guideways that could support the weight of these large vehicles, driving up capital costs to the point where he considered them unattractive.

Haltom turned his attention to developing a system that could operate with shorter timings, thereby allowing the individual cars to be smaller while preserving the same overall route capacity. Smaller cars would mean less weight at any given point, which meant smaller and less expensive guideways. To eliminate the backup at stations, the system used "offline" stations that allowed the mainline traffic to bypass the stopped vehicles. He designed the Monocab system using six-passenger cars suspended on wheels from an overhead guideway. Like most suspended systems, it suffered from the problem of difficult switching arrangements; since the car rode on a rail, switching from one path to another required the rail to be moved, a slow process that limited the possible headways.

=== Vero and Rohr ===
In the 1960s, Haltom sold his ideas to Vero, Inc. of Garland, Texas. Vero developed a new switching system with no moving parts, and started development of a test track at their headquarters, which opened in 1969.

Vero's test track opened shortly after the publication of the highly influential HUD reports that gave strong backing to the PRT concept. At the time the Apollo Program was winding down and Richard Nixon was in the process of extracting the country from the Vietnam War. There was considerable concern about the health of the aerospace industry, which would be losing two of its major funding sources at the same time.

Many aviation companies attempted to rapidly diversify, and a number started mass transit programs as a way of doing so. One such company was Rohr, Inc., who were best known as a sub-contractor to other aviation firms. They had already started work on a high-speed train under a 1970 Urban Mass Transit Administration (UMTA) contract, their Tracked Air-Cushion Vehicle (TACV) was a licensed version of the French Aérotrain. With the widespread interest in PRT's starting around the same time, Rohr took the opportunity to buy Monocab from Vero in 1971.

=== ROMAG ===
Unhappy with the original design, Rohr decided to make a decidedly more "space age" version of the basic concept as the ROMAG. ROMAG used the same basic conceptual design with offline stations and centralized routing, but replaced the wheeled suspension with a magnetic levitation and the conventional electric motors with a linear induction motor (LIM). These changes eliminated the vast majority of the vehicle's moving parts, leaving only the doors and fans, and thereby offered dramatically increased reliability and reduced maintenance needs.

Two LIMs were used, one on either side of the vehicle, arranged in a unique fashion that acted as both the motors and lift systems. The contact-less suspension would be smooth riding and silent, major considerations for operations close to houses in an urban environment. As the system did not depend on physical contact for traction, it would operate with equal effectiveness when covered with rain or snow, and could climb steeper grades and turn sharper corners.

They developed different versions of the vehicle that could run over or under a single rail, allowing bi-directional travel on a single guideway. This reduces the trackage, otherwise considered an eyesore. The new design first ran on 6 March 1971, and a test track was set up at Rohr's Chula Vista, California plants, consisting of a loop of bottom-running suspension track and a separate grade-level top-running track and one offline station.

=== Sales efforts ===
Rohr bid on a variety of PRT contracts in the U.S. and Canada. In Canada it was one of over a dozen entries in the GO-Urban project that envisioned four major PRT lines in the downtown Toronto area. The Ontario government demanded considerable Made in Ontario content, which led to most of the projects being eliminated with the exception of a design from Hawker Siddeley Canada of Thunder Bay, Ontario, and an entry from Krauss-Maffei who agreed to local production and the stipulation that the local factory would be sole bidder on any North American sales. Krauss-Maffei's Transurban eventually won the contract, a design that was substantially similar to the ROMAG. The only other project to consider ROMAG was a much smaller system in Las Vegas that ended when the federal capital funding dried up.

The ROMAG was one of four major PRT entries demonstrated at the Transpo 72 show at Dulles Airport in Washington, DC, but as the maglev version had only just been set up in California, Rohr used the older wheeled system from Vero instead. In the aftermath of the show, the UMTA started the Advanced Group Rapid Transit (AGRT) program to continue development funding for three of the systems, Boeing, Otis and Rohr. Phase I of the AGRT started in February 1974, with the ROMAG receiving less funding than the others. The Phase II program was to originally end in 1979, but was later extended until 1981. Rohr decided to sell the system to Boeing at this point, a sale that went through on 3 February 1978.

== Bibliography ==
- John Edward Anderson, "Some Lessons from the History of Personal Rapid Transit", 4 August 1996
- Edmund Rydell, "The Transportation Renaissance: The Personal Rapid Transit Solution", Xlibris Corporation, 2001
- Paul Wahl, "Personal Rapid Transit", Popular Science, November 1971
- David Scott and John Free, "Maglev: How they're Getting Trains off the Ground", Popular Science, December 1973 p. 95
- Mike Filey, "Toronto Sketches 5: The Way We Were", Dundurn Press, 1997, ISBN 1-55002-292-X
- Advanced Group Rapid Transit Project Advisory Panel (Panel), "Impact of Advanced Group Rapid Transit Technology", NTIS #PB80-153323, January 1980
