= HUD reports =

Series of studies

The HUD Reports were a series of studies in mass transit systems, funded by the Urban Mass Transportation Administration (UMTA) department of the United States Department of Housing and Urban Development (HUD). The HUD reports were extremely influential in the development of the personal rapid transit (PRT) concept, small pod-like vehicles that automatically travel from point-to-point in extended networks. Their publication in early 1968 sparked off PRT development projects at dozens of companies around the world. In spite of intense interest in the early 1970s, political winds shifted and today there is only one HUD-inspired PRT system in commercial operation, the Morgantown PRT in West Virginia.

== History ==
=== UMTA ===
By the late 1950s it was becoming clear to urban planners that something was seriously wrong with the major cities in the U.S. The rapid increase in automobile ownership in the post-war period was providing citizens with unprecedented mobility, allowing them to leave the cities for housing in the newly created subdivisions at ever increasing distances. As a result there was a flight of capital from the downtown areas, leading to widespread and rapid urban decay.

The creation of the federally funded Interstate Highway System fed into this evolution, and by the early 1960s there was increasing political pressure to do something about the problem - if federal funding created the problem, it should solve it too. A bill was proposed in 1960 to provide federal assistance for mass transportation projects, but never made it out of the United States House of Representatives. After the election of John F. Kennedy as president in 1961, the bill was re-introduced as part of a larger urban housing bill. This time it passed, and was signed into law on 30 June 1961.

In 1962 Kennedy guided Congress to investigate transit issues. He stated that "To conserve and enhance values in existing urban areas is essential. But at least as important are steps to promote economic efficiency and livability in areas of future development. Our national welfare therefore requires the provision of good urban transportation, with the properly balanced use of private vehicles and modern mass transport to help shape as well as serve urban growth." The new bill, providing $375 million in capital assistance over three years, was signed by Lyndon B. Johnson on 9 July 1964, after Kennedy's death.

=== Section 6 ===
Congressman Henry S. Reuss of Milwaukee had learned of dual-mode transit systems in the early 1960s, and at that time gave speeches in which he urged political support for the development of new transit concepts. When the subcommittee formed to produce the UMTA, Reuss was assigned to the project, and through his efforts an additional Section 6(b) was added:

The Secretary shall undertake a study and prepare a program of research, development, and demonstration of new systems of urban transportation that will carry people and goods within metropolitan areas speedily, safely, without polluting the air, and in a manner that will contribute to sound city planning. The program shall (1) concern itself with all aspects of new systems of urban transportation for metropolitan areas of various sizes, including technological, financial, economic, governmental, and social aspects; (2) take into account the most advanced available technologies and materials; and (3) provide national leadership to efforts of states, localities, private industry, universities, and foundations.

As a result of Section 6(b), a series of seventeen $500,000 study contracts were handed out starting in 1966. The reports were finished in late 1967 and released in spring 1968. Among the many studies were conceptual designs of moving sidewalk systems, improvements to conventional rail and road systems, and a variety of other transport options. The reports were summarized by William Merritt and published in 1968 as Tomorrow's Transportation: New Systems for the Urban Future.

=== HUD Reports ===
Tomorrow's Transportation opens with a description of the problem the country was facing:

Urban America will double in the next 40 years, growing as much in that time as all of American urban growth since the landing of the Pilgrims. In that short period, the needs of older cities must be met at the same time that more than 100 million additional persons will be living in the Nation's metropolitan areas. The question facing governments at every level, private industry and the public, is not whether provisions can be made for this massive and complex growth. Houses will be built - as will schools, hospitals, libraries, airports, water and sewer systems, roads, shopping centers and office buildings. Of this there can be no doubt. What is in doubt is the shape and substance of cities and their opportunities; i.e., the quality of urban life. The form and quality of future cities is affected by many factors: Local administration, intergovernmental relations, municipal finance, private investment, water and sewer and other public facilities, and - basically - by urban transportation. The life of a city depends on its transportation system. Inefficient transportation services increase the costs of local industry and commerce. They rob citizens of their time and comfort. They penalize especially the poor and the handicapped.

Facing what appeared to be a crisis in transportation, the reports suggested several plans of action. The first was to immediately research improvements in existing systems and to disseminate those improvements as quickly as possible. The HUD had already been working in partnership with industry to improve service, for instance, HUD carried out experiments on the New York City Subway to test installations of two-way radios between operator cabs and central control, which decreased train delays by 41%. Similar experiments were carried out on automated routing and scheduling, communications, rail grinding, even informational displays for passengers.

But most of Tomorrow's Transportation outlined future possibilities and urged a rapid and extensive development project, amounting to $980 million. They outlined three areas for research, the "dial-a-bus" system using small buses and on-demand service, "dial-a-taxi" using automated car-like vehicles, and dual-mode systems that allowed these two classes of vehicles to ride on dedicated rights-of-way for longer distances and higher speeds. In order to test these concepts, the reports suggested that two new facilities be created, the "Urban Transportation Information Center", a clearing house of transit data, and the "Urban Transportation Test Center" that would offer companies a government-funded testing facility to run their experimental systems.

=== HUD and PRT ===
These HUD reports were one of the first times that the concept of personal rapid transit (PRT) was introduced to a wide audience. Although there was some small-scale experimentation with PRTs since the 1950s, most of it remained on paper. One of the studies in the HUD collection was run by the General Research Corporation (GRC) and suggested that PRT systems were needed with some immediacy. The GRC study examined four cities; Boston as an example of a large transit-oriented city, Houston as a large auto-oriented city, Hartford as a small transit-oriented city, and Tucson as a small auto-oriented city. They showed that, with the projected population growth and growth of the use of automobiles, using conventional transit systems would continue to worsen the problems in cities. Only by deploying personal transit systems would it be possible to reverse the direction.

One of the early pioneers in the PRT field was Donn Fichter. In 1964 he published Individualized Automated Transit and the City, which suggested that people would not leave their cars unless transit systems offered the same sort of personalized point-to-point on-demand service. This was a highly influential work that was being circulated within the urban planning field while the HUD reports were being studied. When the GRC work was summarized in 1969 in the Scientific American article "Systems Analysis of Urban Transportation Systems" (January 1969, pages 19–27), Fichter's arguments, along with the GRC computerized studies, led to a widespread interest in PRT systems.

The approximately 100-page report "Tomorrow's Transportation-" examines and explains these new concepts and suggests three areas for development (numbers and bold added, and paraphrased):

1. "True" PRT systems using small automated car-like vehicles.

2. Dual-mode systems using conventional buses and hybrid cars.

3. Palleted systems that would allow conventional cars and buses to drive on and off automated railways for service within urban cores.

In all three cases, the downtown portions of the transit would be electric, which they suggested would alleviate the smog problems that were a serious concern in the 1960s.

In early 1968 the Board of Trustees of The Aerospace Corporation examined the HUD reports and started a study project of their own. Led by vice president Jack Irving, their reports included highly detailed simulations of various systems under a wide variety of loading conditions, with thousands of vehicles operating at headways (the distance-time between like vehicles in transit) of .06 seconds at speeds up to 60 mph. Their study also strongly supported the idea of low-passenger, short-headway PRT systems.

=== Implementation ===
Within months of the HUD reports being published, the UMTA was flooded with requests from the companies involved to gain further funding in order to develop some of their ideas into prototype systems. This was happening in the midst of the handover from the Johnson administration to the newly incoming one of Richard Nixon, which caused delays and confusion. However, the rush of proposals dovetailed neatly into a problem the Nixon administration was struggling to solve, the rapid reduction in money flowing in the aerospace industry with the ending of the Apollo Program and the promised winding-down of the Vietnam War.

So, in spite of an apparent lack of technical interest within the new administration, a series of development contracts followed, leading to a series of prototype systems from aviation firms across the country. Not to be outdone, General Motors and Ford both started work on their own systems, hoping to avoid being locked out of what was apparently the start of a huge series of installations. This led to a series of foreign companies starting their own projects, as the PRT field was clearly the "next big thing". By the early 1970s there were about a dozen development efforts underway in the U.S., about half that in Japan, three in Germany, two in France and one in Canada.

On 21 January 1972, during his budget introduction, President Nixon announced a program to develop PRT systems. He noted that "If we can send three men to the moon 200,000 miles away, we should be able to move 200,000 people to work three miles away." As part of the announcement, he ordered the UMTA to divert $20 million of its capital funds to PRT development. The UMTA ignored the request, and instead the Office of Science and Technology within the Executive Office took up the task, starting a development program with NASA's Jet Propulsion Laboratory. After strong lobbying from influential Senator Robert Byrd, Morgantown, West Virginia was selected as the site for the installation of a prototype system based on the Alden staRRcar system.

=== Transpo '72 ===
The results of the HUD studies came to fruition at the Transpo '72 show at Washington Dulles International Airport. In 1971, the UMTA granted $1.5 million each to four companies to set up demonstration systems at the show. The systems selected were the Rohr ROMAG, the Ford ACT, WABCO and Otis Elevator.

In spite of the high hopes represented by the Transpo show, city leaders showed little interest and no major orders for PRT systems were forthcoming. With the election pressures off after November 1972, Nixon replaced all of his appointed officials within the hierarchy. Notwithstanding a "Memorandum-of-Understanding" party at NASA, the NASA PRT program stalled within UMTA while the UMTA planned its own program. Several follow-on development projects were announced, only to have their funds diverted into other programs. While the Morgantown system continued development, other requests to the UMTA were essentially ignored, and then abandoned.
