= GO-Urban =

Overview
- Status: Cancelled
- Locale: Toronto, Ontario, Canada

Service
- Type: Automated guideway transit
- System: Not implemented
- Operator: GO Transit

GO-Urban was a planned mass transit project for Greater Toronto to be operated by GO Transit. The system envisioned the use of automated guideway transit vehicles set up in hydro corridors and other unused parcels of land to provide rapid transit services without the expense of constructing tunnels. GO-Urban would serve high-density areas in the downtown core, but also be able to accelerate to high speed between distant stations in the outskirts of the city. Similar deployments were planned for Hamilton and Ottawa.

The planners initially selected the Krauss-Maffei Transurban maglev system as the GO-Urban vehicle, but this ran into serious technical and funding problems and was eventually cancelled in 1974. A new vehicle, known today as the Bombardier ART, was introduced to fill the niche for the Transurban. However, by the time it was ready for service in the early 1980s, changes in the provincial government ended official support for the entire GO-Urban concept. Only a single short demonstration line was built in Toronto, the Scarborough RT.

Although GO-Urban was never built as envisioned, the ART vehicle has seen use in other cities. Today it forms the basis for the majority of the Vancouver SkyTrain system and several shorter lines in cities around the world.

== History ==
=== Expressway plan ===
Following World War II, like most other North American cities, Toronto entered a period of urban sprawl that was fed by the creation of large highway systems. The highways were built by the province, not the city, and did not enter the city core. Commuters could approach what was then the outskirts of the city, but getting to work in the business areas on the shore of Lake Ontario was extremely time-consuming. As more and more of the population moved into the suburbs, an efficient transit system that served these users became increasingly important.

Starting in the 1940s, various plans were developed to greatly expand the highway network within the city. In 1954, the new regional government of Metro Toronto was formed to serve the growing area. Its priorities were infrastructure, including water systems and transportation so as to develop the suburbs. The highway plans to serve the suburbs were adopted into the Metro Toronto Official Plan. Construction of some portions of the network had already started at this point, including the Gardiner Expressway along the lake shore and the Don Valley Parkway on the eastern side of the downtown area. There was initially little controversy as they were developed in areas that were formerly industrial or undeveloped, but as the Gardiner approached the downtown area it required the destruction of some houses.

By the late 1960s, the mood of the citizens had changed considerably. As the routes were extended, the number of houses that would have to be torn down increased dramatically. In addition, there was an increasing understanding that having more cars in the downtown area was not advantageous as the amount of gridlock and air pollution increased. There was also growing understanding that the construction of highways led to a flight of capital out of the city cores that caused the rapid urban decay seen in US cities in the 1950s. A report by the planning association admitted this in 1961.

As the debate intensified, the Spadina Expressway became a focal point of citizen concern. The Spadina route ran directly through several densely settled neighbourhoods, including one particularly upscale area of the city, Forest Hill. Adding to the debate was the recent arrival of Jane Jacobs, a tireless campaigner who had managed to end construction of the similar Mid-Manhattan Expressway in New York City. She was able to bring the same organizational powers to the Spadina debate, twice arrested in the process.

On June 3, 1971, Ontario Premier Bill Davis rose in the Provincial Legislature and stated "Cities were built for people and not cars. If we are building a transportation system to serve the automobile, the Spadina Expressway would be a good place to start. But if we are building a transportation system to serve people, the Spadina Expressway is a good place to stop." The expressway plan was dead, and in its place was a new plan to develop mass transit systems instead.

=== ICTS concept ===
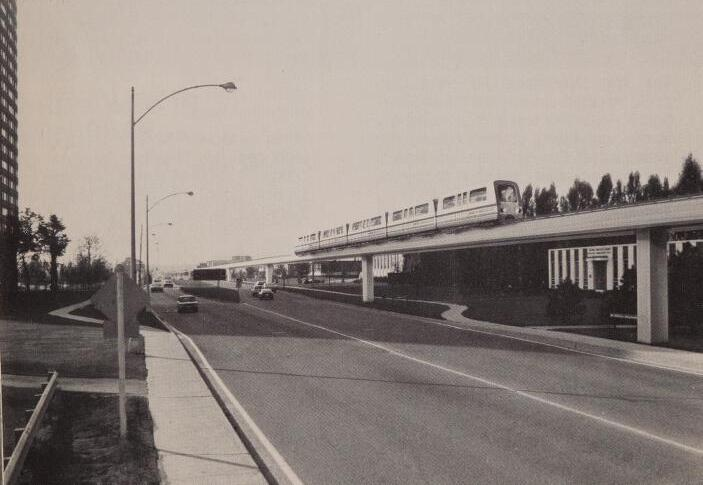
GO-Urban trainset on an elevated track in a concept photo of Overlea Boulevard in Thorncliffe Park, 1973

If a mass transit network was going to be able to replace a highway, the system would need to offer the convenience of a car. Chief among these considerations was the total end-to-end trip time. Although the vehicles did not have to travel as fast as cars, they did need to have clear right-of-ways that eliminated non-scheduled stops or slowdowns due to traffic congestion.

Subways are the canonical example of a separated mass transit system that can outperform cars even though their inter-station speeds can be quite low. However, subways were expensive to build and demand high ridership levels in order to justify their capital costs. The sort of density needed to provide these levels were found in the downtown area, but the suburbs were too spread out. Buses could serve these areas, but were subject to the whims of traffic and were much slower than a car on the same route due to their frequent stops.

What was needed was a new system that could offer the trip times of a subway but with much lower capital and operational cost. Since a considerable portion of the capital cost of a subway is digging the routes underground, the new system could reduce this by operating aboveground, perhaps elevated. This meant that it had to be very quiet, as the main complaint about elevated railways was the sound of the wheels, especially as they rounded corners.

Another consideration was the cost of the stations, which was a factor of the size of the trains. In order to reduce station costs, and the cost of elevated tracks, the trains would have to be smaller than a normal subway. Finally, to reduce operating costs, the system should be completely automated and have as few moving parts as possible. The new system would be aimed at ridership levels above that of buses, about 5,000 passengers per hour per direction (PPHPD), and below that of subways, at 25,000 PPHPD and over. The result was the Intermediate Capacity Transit System (ICTS) concept, aimed at ridership levels between 4,000 and 20,000 PPHPD.

The ICTS would be used in a new network of three major lines in the Toronto area known as GO-Urban. GO-Urban's main line started at Finch Avenue and Jane Street, running down Jane to Eglinton Avenue where it bent into a U-shape passing through the downtown core, then started north again, hitting Eglinton again at Don Mills Road and continuing north along Don Mills to Finch. For a portion of the route, especially in the downtown areas, the route ran in existing rail corridors. A second line ran east-west across Eglinton, mostly underground, from the Malton Airport in the west to Finch and the Don Valley Parkway in the east. Here it joined the final line in the network, running in the hydro corridor along Finch from near the airport in the west to the distant reaches of Scarborough and beyond in the east.

Similar systems were planned for Hamilton and Ottawa.

=== Transurban ===
Toronto was one of many cities facing the same sort of transit problems, and companies around the world were already developing a variety of ICTS-like vehicles under the broad variety of approaches known as automated guideway transit (AGT). Although there had been considerable interest in AGT within industry, this had failed to translate into any major purchase agreements.

When Ontario announced the GO-Urban plan, it quickly became the focal point for many of these efforts – whatever system Toronto selected would be a major "win" that would help future sales of that system. When a call for tenders was put out in 1971 there was widespread response from industry, and a process of selecting a single system started. The first selection process reduced the field to three; a "space age" maglev entry from Krauss-Maffei known as the Transurban, the Ford ACT, and a version of the Minitram system from Hawker-Siddeley Canada.

One feature of the ICTS requirements quickly weeded out many of the entries. Most AGT systems were designed to service denser areas of smaller cities, or less-dense areas of larger cities. In either case, the systems were envisioned to operate like small subways, with short inter-station distances and fairly low speeds. GO-Urban envisioned a single vehicle operating in these denser environments, then moving along the long-distance routes at much higher speeds.

Ford's ACT was fairly conventional and could not meet the requirements for the higher speed travel; they withdrew from the competition. The Transurban and Hawker-Siddeley entries both solved the speed problems in the same fashion; each vehicle in the system could operate at high speed individually, and when they approached the higher density areas they would automatically link together into multi-unit trains. That way they would still have the same, or greater, rider capacity even though they were travelling slower and stopping more often.

Another consideration for the project was that the system had to be built in Ontario, and additional work or sales from Ontario would be considered to be a major advantage. Hawker-Siddeley had an obvious advantage in this respect, but Krauss-Maffei agreed to move all testing and construction to Ontario, as well as using the Ontario office for all sales into North America. The US companies would not match this later requirement, preferring to make sales to the US from their US factories and offices.

In spite of being the outsider, the Transurban's space age maglev concept quickly caught the attention of everyone involved. It had only two major moving parts on the vehicles, the doors and the air conditioning system. In theory, this would lead to far lower operational costs than the rubber-wheeled and motor-driven design from Hawker-Siddeley. It was no surprise when the Transurban was announced as the winners of the contest on 1 May 1973. The company took a share in the Ontario Crown Corporation set up to run location development, the Ontario Transportation Development Corporation.

=== Prototype ===
A test track for the system started construction in late 1974 on the grounds of the Canadian National Exhibition (CNE), just west of the downtown core. The system would open for riders around the park for the CNE show in August 1975, with stops at the GO station on the northern edge of the fair, the large parking lots on the west end, at the gates of Ontario Place, and the eastern end at the Princes' Gates. It was originally planned that this track would later be extended to Union Station, downtown, but these plans were dropped.

Within the transit world, excitement about the system was widespread. GO-Urban would be the first production installation of what was then widely believed to be the next wave in mass transit. In 1973 Bill Davis won the transit "man of the year" in the U.S. in a presentation in Florida.

Toronto became a common destination for urban transit planners to meet. An IEEE meeting was held at the CNE in 1973, where a speaker suggested that the federal government should also turn to Krauss-Maffei for inter-city train service between Toronto and Montreal. He suggested that building such a line would eliminate the need for the expensive airports being built in those two cities - Pickering Airport in Toronto and Mirabel in Montreal.

=== Scarborough route ===
While GO-Urban was being planned, the Toronto Transit Commission (TTC) was in the midst of its own route planning. Having concluded that most routes suitable for subway service were already built, they too were looking for some sort of intermediate vehicle. Their search led them to select new streetcar designs as the appropriate solution. A network of road-level, semi-separated and full-separated routes were being planned around the city, and UTDC had been selected to build the vehicles that would run on them.

The small test track at the CNE would not be useful for a full-scale prototype system for GO-Urban, however, and the planners started looking for a suitable location for a short system that could be used in a full production setting. Their attention quickly settled on one of the TTC's planned streetcar routes, extending from the existing subway lines into Scarborough. When these plans were announced, a flurry of press releases from both parties denouncing each other appeared in the press. William Bidell, an assistant deputy minister, said after the CNE test project was half-finished: "I don't care what anybody says – for the kind of environmentally clean and virtually noiseless rapid transit system we want in Metro, there's just no way streetcars can do the job."

The public reaction was negative as well. The mood was downright chilly when the planners held an open house to help choose a route through the Scarborough area, where citizens took the opportunity to blast the system.

=== Cancellation ===
Soon after construction started at the CNE, in November 1974 Krauss-Maffei announced that they were forced to withdraw from the project. The underlying maglev technology was being developed as a part of a wider project on the part of the German government that was providing funding for a number of different maglev systems. A project review that year concluded Krauss-Maffei's system was less interesting that ones from Thyssen-Henschel and Messerschmitt-Bölkow-Blohm, and their funding was dropped. The ICTS project plan did not provide enough funding to develop both the vehicle and the underlying maglev technology, and the Ontario government was not interested in taking over the entire project.

There were also technical problems; in testing, the complex systems needed to switch trains on the magnetic tracks froze up in cold weather, and would require a re-design. A US report also noted that the system was surprisingly loud and had poor ride quality. With Krauss-Maffei's financial support gone, and daunting technical problems remaining to be solved, the maglev project died. The test track at the CNE was abandoned in place, with the foundations and a few support pillars already constructed. Krauss-Maffei continued development of the original inter-city Transrapid, but at a very slow pace and through a series of mergers with other companies involved in maglev technology. The first Transrapid system did not enter service until 30 years later.

=== Rebirth ===
Although the province was not willing to take over the maglev system, they did want to continue with the development of the ICTS concept. The basic vehicle chassis, linear induction motor and automated train control system remained the same. Instead of the maglev suspension, however, the vehicle would use rubber wheels. It also lost the ability to automatically form into trains, and operate in high-speed/low-speed situations. In most respects it was a much more conventional design than the original Transurban. A new consortium of Ontario companies was formed to take over development, and the newly rechristened UTDC purchased a parcel of land in Kingston, Ontario as a testing facility.

In testing it was found that the linear motor that powered the vehicle only worked efficiently if the vehicle was a set distance from the track, and the small amount of play in the tires was enough to upset the system. The rubber wheels had to be replaced by steel ones, but this re-introduced the problem of squealing as the train rounded bends. In order to solve this problem, UTDC purchased several articulated bogie patents from a US developer. Articulated bogies steer each wheel around bends, avoiding the rubbing that makes the sound. With these changes in place, development proceeded quickly.

=== Scarborough RT ===
By 1979 the system was nearing completion and a sales effort started. The larger vehicle, however, was no longer suitable for the original demonstration system at the CNE and a new real-world test site was needed. The company set its sights on two systems, one in Scarborough on the eastern side of Toronto, and another in Hamilton, to the west. Hamilton eventually backed out in 1981.

The Scarborough route had already been laid out as one of the TTC's new streetcar routes, and the TTC was uninterested in switching the service to the ICTS. However, the province was paying 75% of the capital costs for the line and threatened to refuse it if they did not make the switch. A deal was eventually worked out when the province agreed to pay for any cost overruns if the new tracks cost more than the original system. The province briefly proposed that the ICTS also be used between the end of the existing subway line to a new Warden station, a plan that the TTC said was a waste of money as previous studies had already clearly demonstrated that the ridership levels were already high enough that an extension of the subway was more appropriate.

Construction eventually started in 1981, modifying the work already done on the streetcar route to allow it to run the ICTS, as well as adding a new maintenance yard at McCowan. Required changes to the tracks and stations and delays building the new system meant the route didn't open until 1985, three years after the original plans. Cost overruns ran to $100 million, and even after opening the system ran into many difficulties and the TTC received another $27 million to fix the problems.

=== Disappearance ===
The experience soured the province on the ICTS. The original Transurban system was almost double its budget when it was cancelled, and the Scarborough line was about the same. When Davis announced his retirement in 1985, the new David Peterson government balked at the GO-ALRT system and the Toronto subway plan, Network 2011. Plans were seriously curtailed, and GO-ALRT disappeared.
