= Morgantown Personal Rapid Transit =

Transit system in Morgantown, West Virginia

Coordinates: 39.6424°N 79.964°W

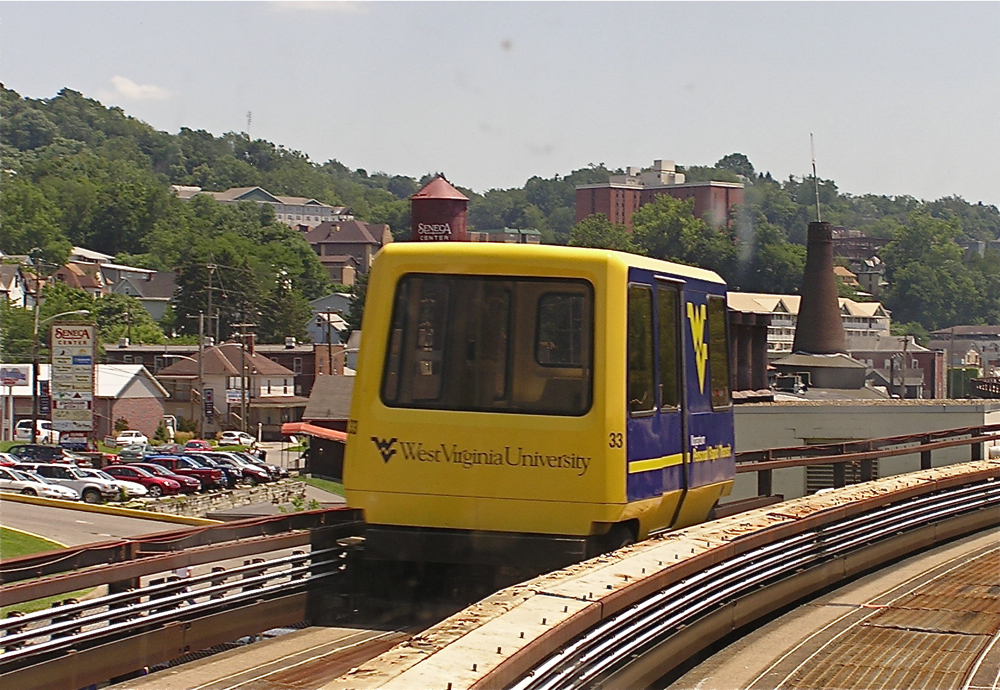
- Morgantown PRT vehicle near Beechurst Avenue

Overview
- Locale: Morgantown, West Virginia
- Transit type: Personal rapid transit
- Number of lines: 1
- Number of stations: 5
- Daily ridership: 16,000

Operation
- Began operation: 1975; 51 years ago
- Operator: West Virginia University

Technical
- System length: 3.6 mi (5.8 km)
- Track gauge: concrete guideway
- Electrification: 575 V AC three-phase conductor rails

Time-lapse video of a trip on the Morgantown Personal Rapid Transit line

Morgantown Personal Rapid Transit (WVU PRT) is a personal rapid transit (PRT) system in Morgantown, West Virginia, United States. The system connects the three Morgantown campuses of West Virginia University (WVU) and the city's downtown area.

Developed from the Alden staRRcar and built by a consortium led by Boeing Vertol, the driverless system was a government-funded experiment in PRT systems. Upon its opening in 1975 with three stations, it had a fitful start, being three years behind schedule and costing 3–4 times more than estimated. It was expanded in 1978 to its current five stations, two maintenance depots, and 67 vehicles. Like all PRT systems, stations are built on sidings, which allows vehicles to bypass stations and permits express trips between any two stations.

While the system achieved reliability upwards of 98% for most of its life, its reliability declined in the 2000s – dipping to 90% by 2015 – and it gained a reputation for unreliability. In response, a renewal project was approved in 2012, which has so far replaced the vehicle control and propulsion systems, replaced parts of the power supply, and repaired other infrastructure. A new vehicle control system was commissioned in 2018, and the vehicle fleet is also being replaced.

The system has operated reliably, transporting students and staff daily.

== History ==
=== Origins ===
Morgantown is a small city with about 30,000 permanent residents, with close to 140,000 in the metropolitan area. WVU adds 28,000 seasonal residents from August through May. As WVU expanded in the 1960s, geographic constraints – the city is situated in a mountain valley along the Monongahela River – forced WVU to build a second campus 2 mi (3.2 km) away in Evansdale. Free busing was offered to move students between the campuses, but all the roads led through the city center, creating gridlock more typical of a megacity.

In the late 1960s, Samy Elias, who led WVU's industrial engineering department, learned of experiments with PRT in the U.S. after the HUD reports were published. A minor PRT craze was being set off by a combination of federal funding and estimates that showed a PRT system would be far less expensive to build and install than any other form of mass transit. Elias felt a PRT would be a perfect solution to the traffic problems in the city.

Gathering support from WVU, the City of Morgantown, and West Virginia's congressional delegation, Elias arranged a $50,000 development grant from the Urban Mass Transportation Administration (UMTA) for a comparative study of three PRT systems: the Monocab, Dashaveyor, and the Alden staRRcar. The Alden staRRcar was found to be the most suitable system for Morgantown.

Political pressure by Senator Robert Byrd led Secretary John Volpe of the then-new United States Department of Transportation to propose that Morgantown be used as an experimental site for PRT development. President Richard Nixon had expressed strong support of the PRT concept, and Volpe was trying to arrange to have an experimental system well underway before the next presidential election, in November 1972.

Examining the proposals, the UMTA decided that Alden was far too small to be able to handle the job, and arranged for the Jet Propulsion Laboratory (JPL) to take over as systems management role, signing a contract with them in December 1970. Boeing Vertol was selected to build the vehicles, Bendix Corporation supplied the control systems, and F.R. Harris Engineering would design and build the guideway, stations, and other facilities.

=== Construction ===
The original estimates for the system were $15–20 million. The project timeline had to be rushed to meet deadlines based on political considerations. JPL, used to running large engineering projects with a stepped approach, had to abandon the study stage and move the project directly to engineering tests.

Numerous problems cropped up as a test system was set up at Boeing's plants, notably that the requirement for heat to melt snow that collected in the U-shaped guideways resulted in costly changes to the design. By the time the original deadline passed, the system was already massively over-budget and nowhere near ready for buildout. Instead of an accomplishment that would work in Nixon's favor, the system became a political chess piece and was derided in the press as a white elephant.

There were large cost overruns during the development of the system, and it was not until 1974 that the system had matured technically. Construction of the first guideway in Morgantown started that year, and was completed the next. The Phase I system began operations in 1975, with a final cost of $62 million, four times the estimate. It consisted of 5.2 mi (8.4 km) of guideway, 45 vehicles, 3 stations, and a maintenance/control facility.

Service was interrupted during the 1978–1979 school year for a system expansion, dubbed Phase II, during which WVU provided bus service between the campuses. The system was extended from the "Engineering" station towards new stations at "Towers" (dormitories) and the WVU Medical Center/Mountaineer Field. Phase II cost $64 million, bringing the total for the entire system to $130 million. Upon its completion, the system had 71 vehicles, 8.65 mi (13.92 km) of guideway, and 5 stations. One existing station had also been expanded, and a second maintenance facility was added.

Although the system's construction ran far over budget, it proved to be what its designers had claimed: a reliable system of automated transit that was inexpensive to operate. It has offered on-time service rates far better than the bus services it replaced, and eliminated the gridlock that had locked up the city center. Moreover, no injuries were reported for the first 42 years of operation, until the first reported accident in November 2016. From July 2005 to June 2006, about 2.25 million rides were taken on the PRT. As of November 2007, the PRT transports about 16,000 riders per day. The record for most riders in a day is 31,280, set on August 21, 2006. In 2003, about 60% of costs were covered by the 50-cent fares.

Morgantown's economy boomed in the 2000s and the city was noted for having the lowest municipal unemployment rate in the U.S. Mayor Ronald Justice said, "We're a small town with big traffic issues, and the PRT could be the reason we're able to continue our growth."

There are two proposals to extend the line from both ends: one would extend southward to the new commercial and shopping area being developed as part of a riverfront revitalization project, while a longer extension is being considered to the northwest to connect a new research park. If both extensions are completed, at an estimated $30–40 million a mile, the system would almost double in length.

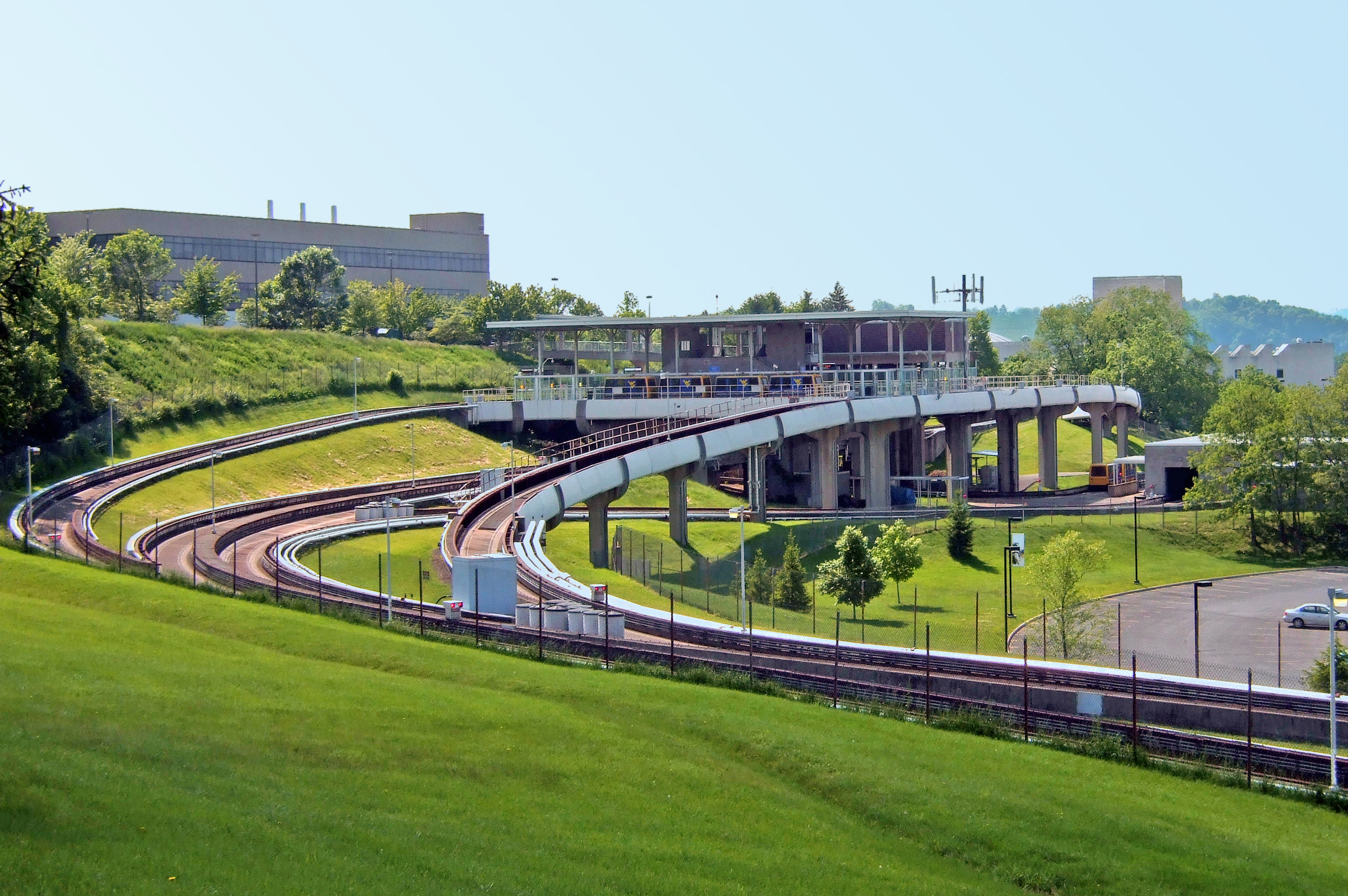
PRT guideway and station (background)

=== Accidents ===
On November 30, 2016, the system had its first reported accident when two PRT cars were involved in a crash between the Beechurst and Walnut stations. There were six passengers on board and two were treated for minor injuries. Service to Walnut station was suspended for several days while the incident was investigated.

On February 10, 2020, two PRT passengers, and WVU students, were taken to Ruby Memorial Hospital for injuries due to a boulder that dislodged from the nearby hillside striking a PRT car. One student on the PRT was seriously injured and suffered multiple pelvic fractures. A driver, on nearby Mon Boulevard, was also taken to the hospital after their vehicle collided with another boulder that was part of the same disturbance. WVU later settled lawsuits filed by both the injured students and the car driver for injures sustained during the accident.

== Description ==
=== Guideway ===
The guideway is a dedicated roadway for rubber-tired vehicles that allows close separation between vehicles. It is a network that connects all stations and the maintenance facility. The guideway is used mostly by the PRT vehicles except in an emergency where maintenance workers can drive a car up to tow a non-functioning PRT vehicle off the guideway.

The guideway is a concrete structure with about half of its length elevated. It has three-phase 575 VAC, 60-Hz propulsion power rails on the sidewall that are equipped with electric heating for cold weather operations. Below the power rails is a steering rail that allows the guidewheel of PRT vehicles to be pressed against to steer along the guideway. Communication induction loops and guideway heating pipes are located on the road surface.

=== Vehicles ===
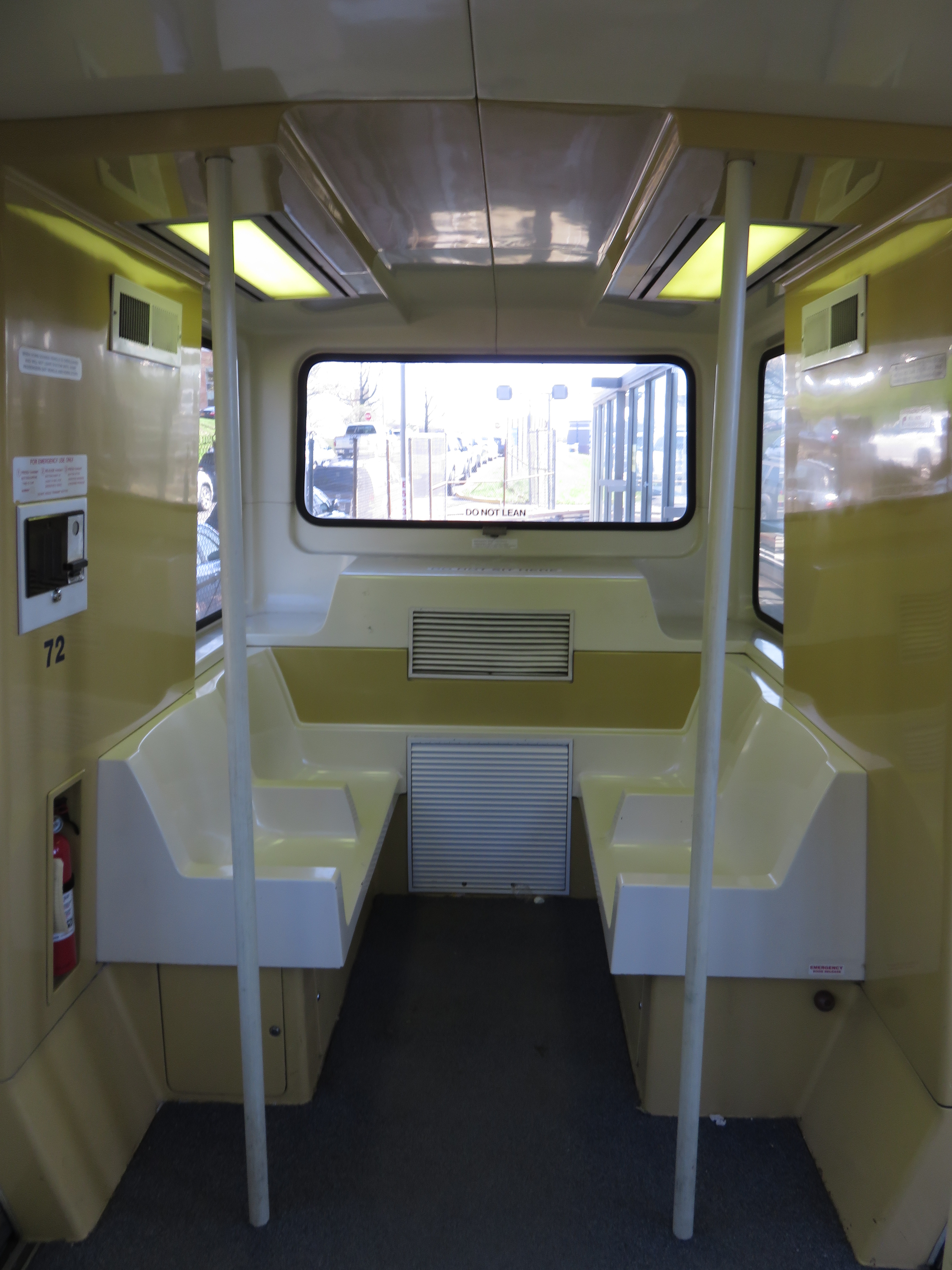
Interior of a PRT car

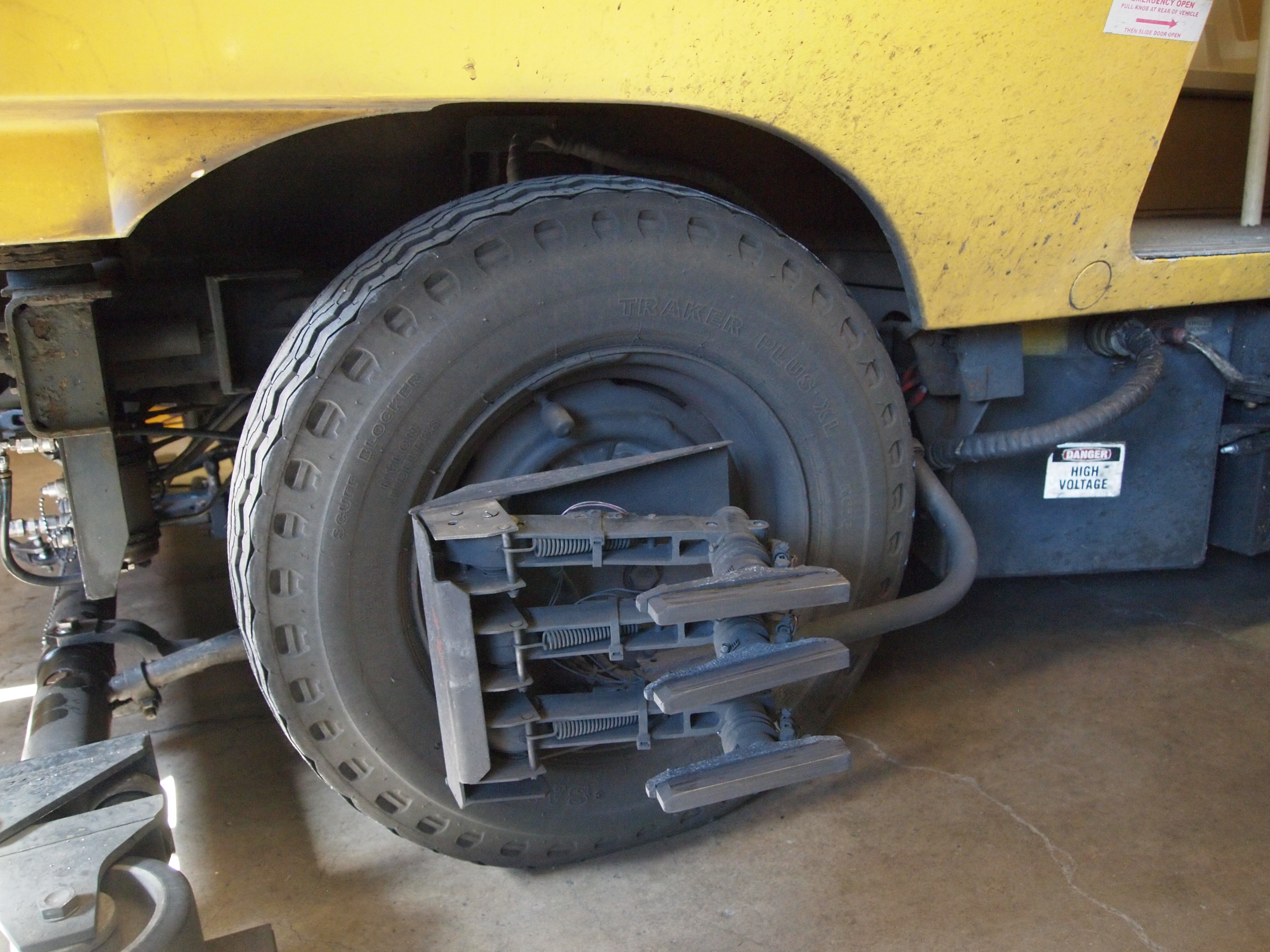
Passive run~on run-off power collector at the front wheel

The system has 73 vehicles that resemble small buses. They are 15 ft 6 in (4.72 m) long, 8 ft 9 in (2.67 m) high and 6 ft 8 in (2.03 m) wide. Weighing 8,760 lb (3,970 kg), they are powered by a 70 hp (52 kW) motor that allows them to reach 30 mph (48 km/h).

The larger vehicle size of the Morgantown Personal Rapid Transit has led some to consider it a "group rapid transit" (GRT) system, instead of a true personal rapid transit system.

The vehicles have automatic doors on both sides that open to the platform, and are accessible for people with mobility disabilities. The vehicles are designed for 20 passengers, with four seats arranged in a "U" on each end and four stanchions in the center of the vehicle for twelve standees. But currently in 2025, the station announces no more than 15 passengers per car. A yearly event called the PRT Cram takes place in which student organizations try to pack as many individuals as possible inside a modified PRT vehicle. The record of 97 was set in 2000.

The cars are powered by three-phase 575-volt alternating current rectified to drive a 70 horsepower (52 kW) direct current motor. Electric pickups are fixed on both sides of each car, which connect to electrified rails on one, or both, sides of the guideway. The wheels of the vehicles steer slightly toward whichever side is powered to ensure that they stay in firm electrical contact with the rails. Each car has four-wheel steering to help negotiate the tight turns in the PRT guideways, especially around stations.

=== Route layout ===
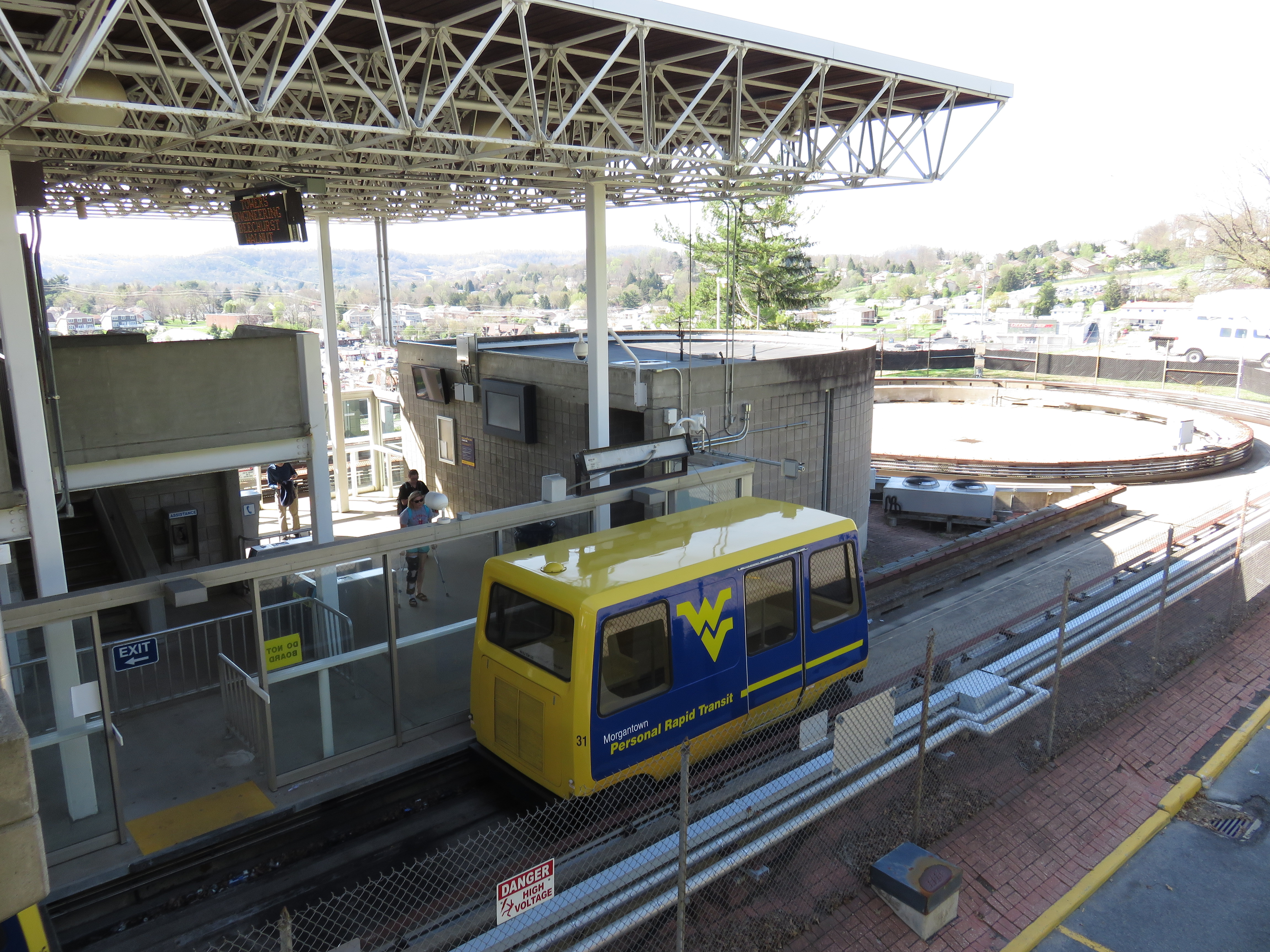
A PRT car in the Medical station

A vehicle steers along the main guideway to bypass two vehicles stopped at a station.

The system connects the university's campuses via five stations (Walnut, Beechurst, Engineering, Towers, Medical) along a 3.6 mi (5.8 km) route. All stations are on sidings, which allows vehicles to bypass stations. It takes 11.5 minutes to ride the entire length of the system from the Walnut Station to the Medical Station.

The guideway consists of concrete pathways with magnetic induction loops that provide car location data. The system's concrete pathways have embedded pipes that circulate a glycol solution, which is heated at stations to help melt snow and ice prevalent in Morgantown's snowy winter climate.

Most of the system (65%) is built on elevated bridges and viaducts, while the remainder is at or below ground level. The viaduct spans are approximately 30 ft (9.1 m) long, and there are two styles of viaduct, with those constructed in Phase I being noticeably heavier-duty than those built in Phase II.

=== Modes of operation ===
The system is fully automated and can operate in three modes: "demand", "schedule", and "circulation".

- Demand: When used during peak hours, the system reacts dynamically to rider requests, comparable to utilizing an elevator. At the fare gate, after the rider pays the fare, they will press the button associated with a particular destination to call a car. This will start a timer within the system. If the timer reaches a predetermined limit, typically 5 minutes, a vehicle is activated to service the request even if no other passengers have requested the same destination. Also, if the number of passengers waiting to travel to the same destination exceeds a predetermined limit, usually 15, a vehicle is immediately activated. User will look at the electronic signboard above the boarding gate to determine which car to board. Once the car arrives, the doors remain open for 20 seconds for boarding, before the vehicle departs to its destination, avoiding any intermediate stations. In this mode the system operates as a true PRT.
- Schedule: System switches to this mode during periods with well-known travel-demand patterns, and operates the cars on fixed routes of known demand. This lowers the waiting time for a car traveling to a given destination and is more efficient than demand mode.
- Circulation: System switches to this mode during off-peak hours, operating a small number of vehicles that stop at every station, like a bus service. This reduces the number of vehicles traveling on the network, but increases travel time to destination.

=== Performance ===
In the 2006 fiscal year, the system broke down 259 times for a total of 65 hours and 42 minutes, out of a total of 3,640 hours and 15 minutes scheduled running time, which equates to about 98% availability. Of those 259 breakdowns, 159 were caused by vehicle-related problems. In 2007, the system received funding to improve efficiency by reducing this vehicle downtime.

Since the system's completion in 1975, technology for PRTs has advanced considerably, but the control equipment for the Morgantown system changed very little. The control room is said to resemble a NASA mission control room from the 1970s, though the underlying electronics are more modern.

As of 2015, the system's cost per trip is $2.01, the third least expensive (after New York and Boston) for any fixed guideway system in the United States.

=== Operation hours ===
Morgantown PRT operates chiefly as transportation for WVU's students and, as such, runs primarily during class days. During the fall and spring semesters, it operates 6:30 am–10:15 pm weekdays and 9:30 am–5:00 pm on Saturdays. It is normally closed on Sundays. During the summer semester, it is closed (as of 2021). When major WVU events – notably football and men's basketball games – are scheduled to end outside of normal operating hours, the system will run for at least an hour after the end of the event. The system is closed on holidays and during semester breaks.

=== Modernization ===
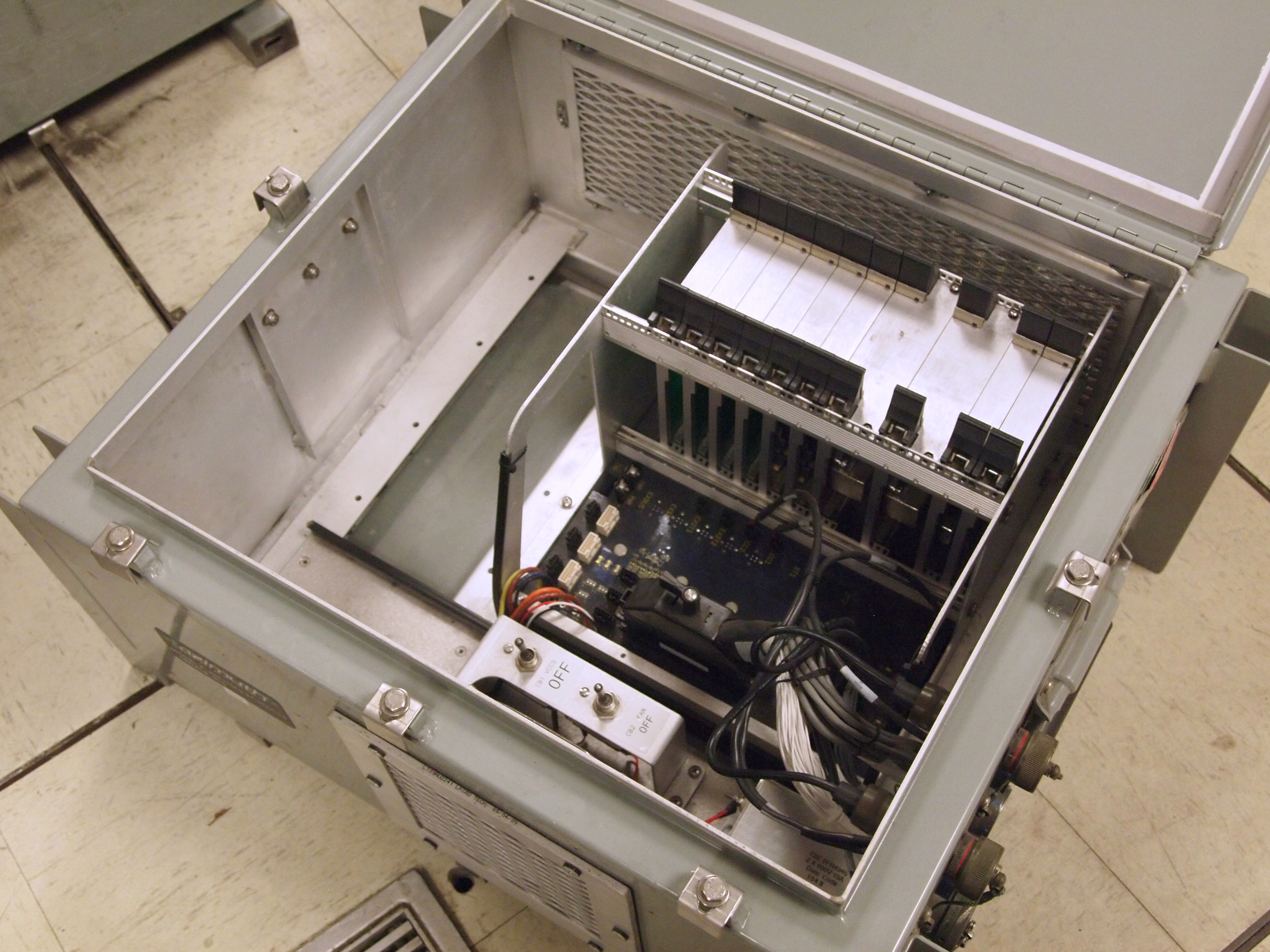
The old on-board vehicle computer system being replaced as part of the Phase 1 modernization project

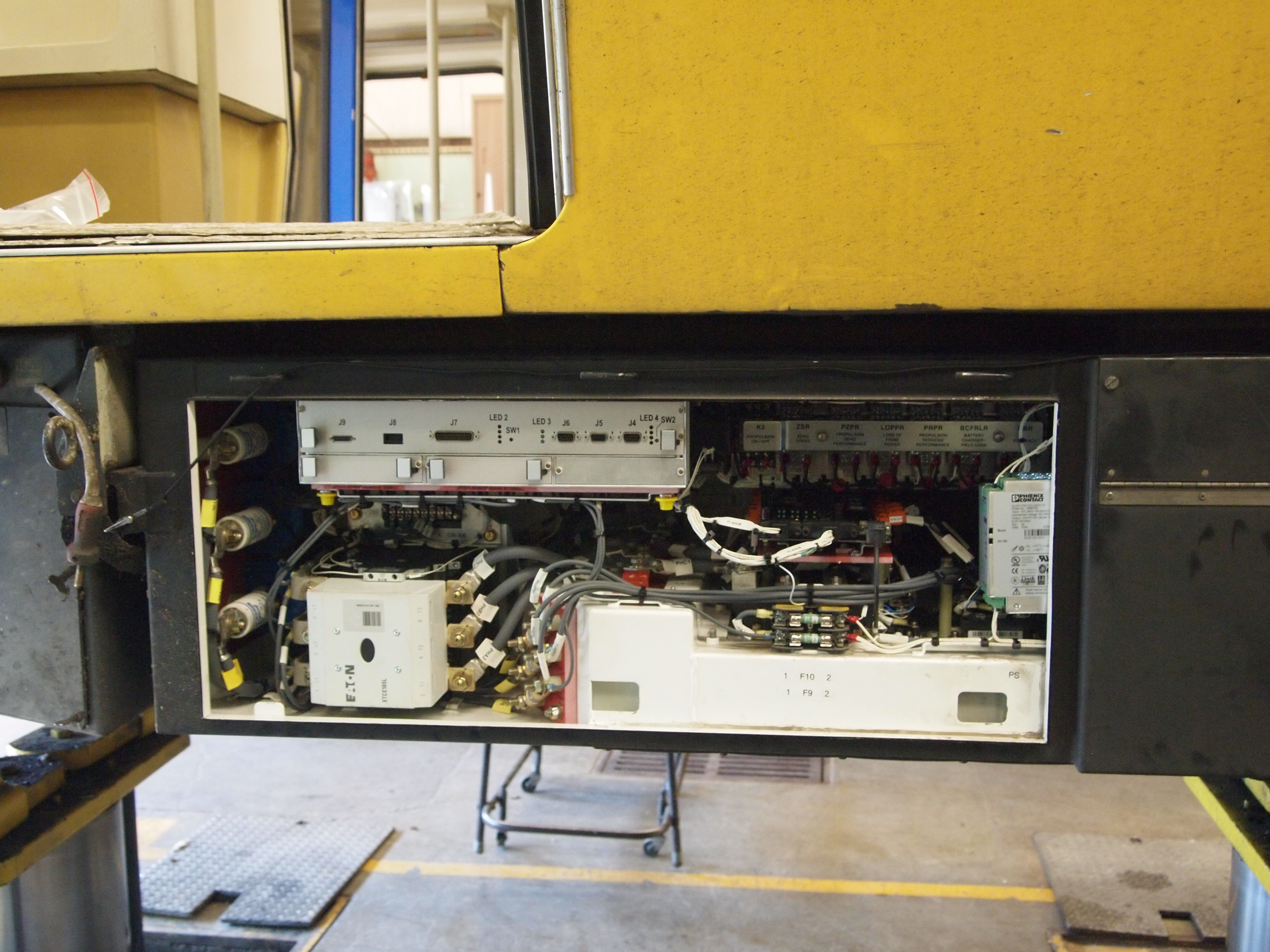
PRT vehicle propulsion system

When it opened, the PRT was controlled by DEC PDP-11 computers installed in 1971. Due to difficulty in procuring replacement parts, these older computers were replaced in 1997–1998 with Intel Pentium computers.

A 2010 study recommended renewal of the system given declining reliability caused by its age and the lack of access to replacement parts for key components, such as the vehicles and the control system. The report considered replacement of the PRT with buses but concluded they would be unsatisfactory given the extra traffic congestion and poor travel times that would result. By 2015 reliability had fallen to 90%.

In 2012, the university Board of Governors approved $15 million as part of renewal and modernization project. The total cost was projected to be $100–$130 million. The three phase plan is to replace the control and propulsion systems in the current vehicles, installation of a new automatic train control system, upgrade the power supply, repairs to the infrastructure and finally replacement of all the vehicles.

Part of the phase 1 work to upgrade the vehicles' control and propulsion system was completed by early 2014 and resulted in improved operations.

On April 29, 2014, Thales Group was selected by WVU to install its SelTrac Communications-based train control (CBTC) system, as well as new systems for fare collection and passenger information. Upgrades occurred during the summer breaks in 2015 and 2017 while the system is normally closed. Replacement of the train control system will continue during the fall 2017 and spring 2018 semesters in preparation for full-scale testing and commissioning during the summer of 2018.

For the vehicle replacement in phase 2, which has not commenced as of September 2017, the university has said it will look for vehicles that weigh 2,500–3,000 lb (1,100–1,400 kg), about one-third the 8,760 lb (3,970 kg) for the current fleet.

The $52.6 million phase 2 renovation of the PRT is still being completed. Over the winter break of the 2017–2018 academic year, 11 cars were upgraded to the new software. The updated cars have not been used during typical business hours as they are not compatible to the current system. In addition to receiving new software, Phase II also includes replacing electric boards and sensors on the guide ways and signs.

== See also ==
- Lists of rapid transit systems
- List of driverless train systems
- Duke University Medical Center, former home of another US PRT system
- Transit Expressway Revenue Line
