= Ford ACT =

1970s people mover system

The ACT, acronym for Automatically Controlled Transportation or Activity Center Transit, was a people mover system developed during the 1970s. One feature of the ACT is that it allowed bi-directional travel on a single rail—cars passed each other by switching onto short bypass lanes on the track, distributed where space allowed. ACT was a contender in the Urban Mass Transportation Administration's plan to deploy three or four systems in cities in the United States, as well as the GO-Urban project in Toronto, Canada. One ACT system was installed as a part of a Ford-funded real estate development near their headquarters in Dearborn, MI, and although they proposed to install ACT in several other locations, no additional systems were ever installed and the project was put on indefinite hold.

== History ==
=== Background ===
The widespread introduction of the automobile in the late 1950s into the 1960s led to new problems in the city cores in terms of moving people to and from work. This was not so much a problem in cities with extensive mass transit systems, like New York City or London, but the expense of developing a useful metro system was one that could only be undertaken by the largest and richest cities. Studies in Canada placed the cost of a conventional metro system at between $75 and $80 million per mile in 1980, about $250 million in 2013, and required high passenger utilization to pay for its construction.

President Kennedy started the process of creating a federally funded project to study the problem and develop solutions. A particularly influential work at the time was Donn Fichter's Individualized Automatic Transit and the City. Most mass transit systems, even today, utilize set routes and stops, generally requiring the rider to change vehicles to reach their destination. Fichter suggested that the only way you could coax drivers to use mass transit would be if it offered the same point-to-point flexibility as the car. Several studies followed, notably by RAND and the Aerospace Corporation, exploring a wide variety of people mover systems.

A series of bills passed through the 1960s and 1970s created the Urban Mass Transportation Administration (UMTA), with funding to develop new systems to match the needs outlined by the earlier reports. Several companies were invited to enter Phase I proposals, which were presented in mock-up form at Dulles Airport for the Transpo 72 trade show. The primary entries were LTV's Airtrans, Rohr, Inc.'s ROMAG and Ford's ACT. These systems shared a number of features; they were completely automated in operation, used computer-guidance to allow short headways (inter-car spacing) as small as 10 seconds, and featured on-demand point-to-point routing. They differed primarily in the technology used to support and guide the train; some used rubber wheels, some were hovercraft, and some were maglev systems.

=== ACT ===
Development of ACT started as an unofficial project in a Ford engineer's basement. John Logan became interested in the people mover concept and invited fellow engineers Richard Skruch and Denny Colovas to join him in designing what would become ACT. They presented their ideas to management, and in the fall of 1970 they agreed to provide funds to develop a prototype car and a short guideway to test it. A mock-up, somewhat different in design from the actual prototypes, was demonstrated at the Transpo '72 show.

A 4000 foot test guideway was built near Allen Park, MI for testing and development of the Transpo '72 demonstration vehicles. Later, a test facility with a complete loop, a bypass area, test grade, maintenance spur and maintenance building, was erected near Ypsilanti, MI. For a time in late 1974, this facility was home to the Transpo '72 vehicles, and the vehicles that would ultimately be installed at Connecticut's Bradley International Airport and Dearborn's Fairlane Town Center. The Fairlane system was worked into a real estate development across the road from Ford's test tracks in Dearborn, MI. One end of the new track connected with one station attached to the exterior of the new Hyatt Regency hotel and the other inside the Fairlane Town Center shopping mall, where the vehicles were stored outside their hours of operation and serviced. A single by-pass for switching was located between the two. The track and two cars completed basic testing in 1976, and were turned over for passenger use between the two buildings. Although the ACT system was later removed, the Fairlane mall's layout retains several vestigial signs of its former presence, notably the bisection of its central interior court.

During the project's lifetime there were numerous expressions of interest in the ACT system. It was one of three Phase II contenders for the GO-Urban project in Toronto, but Ford withdrew after the plans evolved into a higher-speed system for inter-urban movements, not the slower short-haul routes ACT was intended for. A deal was signed for a system at Bradley Field in Hartford, CT, but fell through due to budget cuts after basic installation and state acceptance tests were completed. A 2.1 miles (3.4 km) long loop was considered for El Paso, TX to connect the city with Juarez across the Rio Grande, but also fell to budget cuts. Grand Rapids was the target of a UMTA proposal, but ended along with the UMTA funding.

By the early 1980s interest in people mover systems in urban areas was waning, especially after UMTA lost most of its funding after a somewhat negative GAO report, Better Justification Needed for Automated People Mover Demonstration Projects. Ford put ACT on "indefinite hold" and the project essentially disappeared.

== Description ==
ACT was based around a rubber-wheeled car that Ford referred to as a "horizontal elevator". The vehicles rode in a U-shaped guideway of prestressed concrete. The guideway was about 12 feet (3.7 m) wide and normally built in 60 foot (18 m) cantilevered sections. The vehicles themselves were just less than 7 feet (2.1 m) wide, 9 feet (2.7 m) high and 25 feet (7.6 m) long, and weighed 13,800 pounds (6,300 kg).

To keep the vehicle centered in the guideway, smaller horizontal tires were attached by leaf springs to the main bogies, one in front and rear of the main axle on either side, for a total of four wheels per bogie. The springs pressed the wheels against metal guide rails on either side of the track, and when the car entered a curved section of the guideway they rotated the bogie so it steered along the curve.

A separate set of wheels was also attached to the bogies, located above them on the end of switch arms. These arms were hydraulically extended at the appropriate time and engaged a rail mounted above the power and signal rails, serving to steer the vehicle from the enclosed, single-lane guideway into the bypass areas where the guideway split to become two separate passing lanes. Since the system was centrally controlled and used hydraulics, there was a minimum actuation time that required headways to be around 30 seconds at the normal operating speed of 30 miles per hour (48 km/h). It may be noted that, although the designed and advertised maximum operating speed was 30 miles per hour (48 km/h), the actual cruise speed of the Fairlane system was lowered to about 25 miles per hour (40 km/h), where it remained throughout the duration of its operating lifetime of approximately 12 years.

Power was supplied at 480 V 60 Hz AC, in a corner-grounded Delta configuration, with the guide rail serving as the ground leg and the other two phases supplied on separate rails above the ground/guidance rail. The AC power was converted on board to power two 60 horsepower DC electric motors. The system used regenerative braking, converting the energy back through the DC motors to AC into the lines. Another rail, above the power rails, carried multiplexed frequency 'tones' that were decoded by the vehicles on-board controller into a 3-of-5 command sequence that was used to control all vehicle movement and station cycle functions. The heart of the on-board controller was a DEC PDP-8 minicomputer which interfaced with various vehicle subsystems via dual-redundant fail-safe vital relay logic.

A key safety feature was a novel braking system that consisted of automotive disc brakes attached to the vehicles driveshafts. These brakes were held off by hydraulic pressure that was present whenever the vehicle was connected with guideway power and the on-board controller was commanding them off. In the event of loss of electrical power, the hydraulic pressure holding the brakes was lost and springs inside the cylinders forced brake fluid into the calipers of the disc braking system, ensuring that the vehicles did not simply coast to a stop. In order to provide for a controlled deceleration, a pendulum valve was located in line with the brake actuation cylinders. Pendulums inside the valve reacted to the deceleration profile of the vehicle and would partially close, reducing the pressure in the brake lines and moderating the deceleration so that the emergency stop was not dangerously abrupt.

In operation the ACT systems had more in common with a metro system or the people movers used at airports, using relatively large cars with up to 20 passengers and making stops at all requested stations. As deployed, it was not a true personal rapid transit system, like the contemporary Cabinentaxi or the modern ULTra, which offer true point-to-point service for every car. ACT's unique feature was the embedded bypasses, which allowed bi-directional service on a line consisting primarily of a single track.

== Preservation ==
A pair of ACT vehicles from Bradley International Airport are preserved at the Connecticut Trolley Museum
