= Transpo '72 =

Trade show in 1972

U.S. International Transportation Exposition
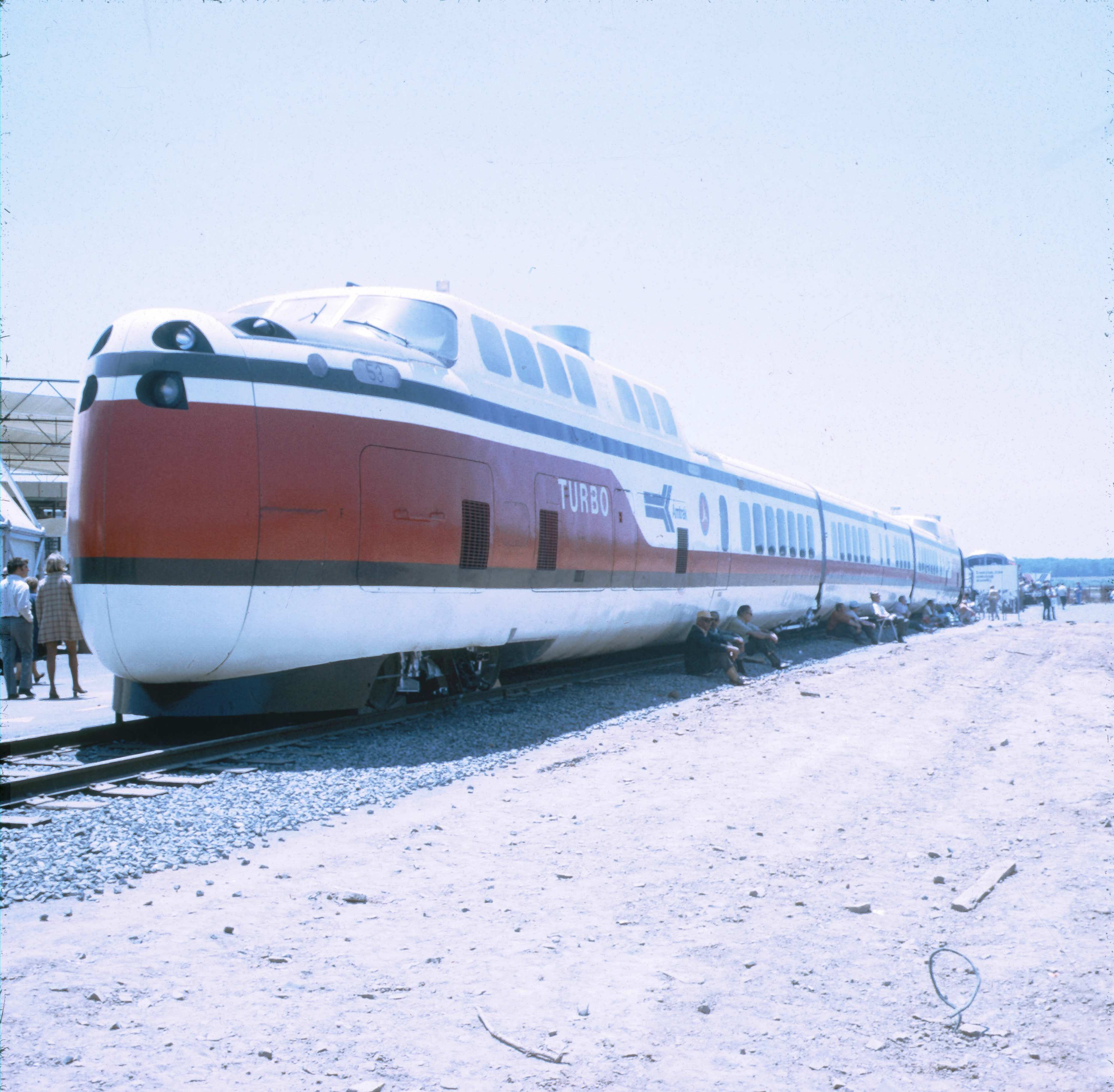
- Amtrak UAC TurboTrain at Transpo '72
- Date: May 27 – June 4, 1972
- Venue: Dulles International Airport
- Location: Loudoun County, Virginia
- Also known as: Transpo '72
- Type: transportation trade show
- Budget: $10 million
- Organized by: U.S. Department of Transportation

U.S. International Transportation Exposition, better known as Transpo '72, was a trade show held on 300 acres (1.2 km^{2}) of land at Dulles International Airport outside Washington, D.C., for nine days from May 27 to June 4, 1972. The $10 million event, sponsored by the U.S. Department of Transportation, was a showcase for all sorts of transportation-related technologies. Over a million visitors flocked to the show from all over the world. According to the Wall Street Journal, it was "the biggest show the government has put on since World War II."

Transpo hosted the world's largest air show, all of the new widebody airliners, high-speed trains and demonstrations of the latest automated guideway transit systems. In addition to featuring futuristic technology "Flying trains, square dancing helicopters and the fantasy of a wonderland," according to a news release, Transpo '72 covered all current modes of transportation as well. General Manager William J. Bird explained, "We want to emphasize totally integrated systems in our future transportation..."

The event was officially opened by the second U.S. Secretary of Transportation, John Volpe.

== Background ==
Transpo was the idea of L. Mendel Rivers, chairman of the House Armed Services Committee. Rivers had visited the Paris Air Show on occasion; at the time, there were a "ring" of three major air shows in Europe that took turns hosting, Farnborough, Paris and Hanover. Visitors from around the world could come to the show where sales teams from the aviation firms were ready to sign deals for their latest products. Rivers lamented the fact that there was no similar industry-based show in the U.S. Rivers started planning a U.S. version of the air/trade show, and selected Washington as a natural location due to the density of military contacts and the presence of the recently expanded Dulles Airport. Rivers went to Congress with a request for $750,000 in funding.

However, this was during an era of rapid shifts within the aviation industry. The winding-down of major purchases to feed the Vietnam War and Project Apollo was forcing the major aerospace firms to seek ways to diversify, and the government was actively funding a number of mass transit projects in partnership with them. Rivers changed the focus to be a show about any form of transit, not just aircraft, and the size and cost started to increase. He won an initial appropriation of $3 million for the show, but had to return to Congress for another $2 million to keep it on track as its scale rapidly increased. Critics, notably William Proxmire, attacked the event and claimed that the actual costs would be closer to $10 million when industry input was considered.

By the time the show was ready it had expanded greatly, including not only displays but industry meetings, open seminars and hosts of presentations large and small. The official program was 80 pages. Pre-show estimates of visitors ranged about the 1 million mark or larger. Final attendance was put at 1.25 million.

== Aircraft ==
The show included displays from major aviation firms showing their latest aircraft. On the first day, the prototype Boeing 707, the "Dash 80", arrived at the airport on its way to becoming an exhibit at the Smithsonian. The same day, BOAC announced its first official order for five Concordes. Douglas Aircraft, Lockheed and Boeing all used the show as a sales platform for their latest designs, the DC-10, L-1011 and 747, respectively. Douglas and Lockheed had recently started deliveries, and flew in production versions of their aircraft for the show directly from the assembly line. Numerous military aircraft also arrived, including the C-5 Galaxy.

Airbus Industrie arrived at the show to promote their A300, claiming that the longer-ranged A-300B-4 variant would present strong competition in the U.S. domestic market due to operating costs being 5 to 7% lower than the L-1011 and DC-10 trijets. Noting that the original contract that led to the trijets had called for a twin-engine aircraft, Ken Gordon of Airbus North America claimed that the original specification still needed to be filled. The third engine of the US designs gave them the ETOPS performance needed for trans-Atlantic flights, but were unneeded for flights within North America, which the 300 could meet with lower operational costs. Douglas and Lockheed responded by using the show to pitch two-engine versions of their three-engine designs to compete with the A300.

Japan's Ministry of International Trade and Industry had been trying to develop a shorter-range airliner they called the "YX" for some time, but had backed away from talks with Boeing after the value of the Yen fluctuated. Lockheed announced that they were going to approach Japan and the government-owned Air Canada to develop a two-engined version of the L-1011 as a way of filling both the "YX" needs as well as for domestic flights within Canada. The "BiStar" was 30 feet (9.1 m) shorter, had new wings and tail, and was powered by two upgraded RB-211-X engines, which Lockheed was already developing for the extended-range L-1011-2.

Douglas, recently purchased by McDonnell, had also been pitching a two-engine version of the DC-10, which combined the body of the -10 with the wings of the -30, along with the upgraded CF6-50 engine. Interest had been tepid when the idea was first floated, but with Lockheed's and Airbus' aggressive moves they once again brought the idea forward. Boeing was coy on the topic of a smaller 747, but suggested they were instead looking at an entirely new design, a "long thin" aircraft similar to an enlarged twin-engine 707. In the end, Japan Air Lines' YX needs were filled with 747-100SR, for "short range", which added passenger capacity at the cost of range. Boeing's "long, thin" design would emerge as the Boeing 757 - it was the only one of the proposed twins to actually ship.

Small designs at the show included several smaller jets, notably the North American debut of the Fokker F.28, several business jets including the IAI Commodore (soon to be known as the Westwind), British Aerospace BAe 125, and the propeller-powered Fairchild Hiller FH-227, Britten-Norman Trislander and DeHavilland Twin Otter.

NASA and the FAA also had a major presence at the show, demonstrating their efforts to lower the noise and pollution of air travel. One major program at that time was the microwave landing system, which would allow aircraft to approach from much wider angles and avoid stacking them up over a single approach vector, spreading out the noise. They also demonstrated new engine technologies and stated that the widely used JT8D fleet would be free of smoke by 1972. A combination of these technologies, along with supercritical wings, composites and artificially stable control systems would improve fuel economy of future airliners by 60%.

Major avionics firms also attended in force. Goodyear brought their STARAN computer, originally developed for missile interception and similar duties, but now being pitched as an air traffic control (ATC) system that would optionally use a computer-generated voice to automatically send traffic advisories to pilots. Plessey was showing their ACR 430 radar for smaller airfields, and with Lockheed they were demonstrating their then-incomplete automated ATC system based on a Lockheed MAC-16 minicomputer.

The United States Coast Guard displayed their Air Cushion Vehicle hovercraft at the expo, where tens of thousands of visitors examined it every day. The craft also conducted a daily test flight in front of thousands of onlookers, making it the first Coast Guard vehicle of its kind to do so. The Coast Guard estimates that 1.2 million people saw the Air Cushion Vehicle over the course of the whole expo.

== AGT systems ==
During the 1960s the government had spent an increasing amount of development funding on automated guideway transit (AGT) systems as a solution to providing mass transit in smaller cities and suburbs of larger ones. At the same time, aerospace companies in the U.S. were suffering from a lack of projects as the Vietnam War wound down and the Project Apollo buildout was completed. Groups within the government and industry saw the AGT efforts as a perfect opportunity to diversify. By the time Transpo was being planned, the Urban Mass Transit Administration (UMTA), predecessor of the Federal Transit Administration (FTA), had invested $12 million in AGT research, and the companies added another $45 million.

In 1970, UMTA felt it was time to move from experiments to prototype installations, and arranged funding for three major installations. One of these would emerge as the Vought Airtrans, another as the Morgantown PRT, and finally the third block of funds provided four companies $1.5 million each to bring their AGT developments to Transpo '72. Carlos Villarreal, administrator of UMTA, stated that Transpo "marks UMTA's entry into the space age of mass transportation."

The four chosen systems were the Bendix Dashaveyor, the Ford ACT, TTI Hovair (a spin-off of General Motors) and the Rohr ROMAG, represented by its former rubber-wheeled prototype, the Monocab. Boeing and Vought also showed cars from their larger systems, Boeing's version of the Alden staRRcar being installed in Morgantown, and the Vought Airtrans being installed at Dallas/Fort Worth International Airport. Ford would later install a small ACT deployment at a shopping mall in Dearborn, and Dashaveyor would win a contest for the Toronto Zoo Domain Ride, but further sales were not forthcoming. Several European companies also presented models of their designs. The plans to use Transpo as a way to excite mayors into buying the AGT systems failed, a disappointment to both UMTA and Congress.

Car companies at the show were sober in their assessments of the future of AGT systems. GM showed a movie about the future of transit in Detroit which clearly put the car in first place. Henry Ford II said that only a "limited portion" of the Highway Trust Fund should be used for public transportation, and then only for research into "new transportation concepts."

== High-speed rail ==
As part of the High Speed Ground Transportation Act of 1965, the newly formed United States Department of Transportation (DOT) was funding a number of studies into high-speed trains under the Federal Railroad Administration (FRA) group. One of these projects was the UAC TurboTrain, which had recently entered service with Canadian National Railways, only to be pulled from service shortly after due to a wide variety of minor problems. One of the two three-car TurboTrain prototypes built for the DOT visited Transpo.

However, the DOT was more interested in really high speed trains, and had been funding several developments along these lines for some time. In order to expedite these developments, they had recently selected a parcel of land outside Pueblo, Colorado as a test site that would become the Transportation Technology Center (TTC). They planned on using the TTC to lower the cost of all-up testing of advanced designs, as well as guaranteeing that all the participants would have a level playing field. Several U.S. companies were in the process of building hovertrain systems based on technology licensed from the French Aérotrain project, known under the U.S. term "Tracked Air-Cushion Vehicle", or "TACV", and these were in the process of being set up at the TTC.

Several models of proposed developments were shown at Transpo. These included models of Garrett AiResearch's wheeled linear induction motor (LIM) testbed vehicle, drawings of Grumman Aircraft's and General Electric's TACV proposals, and a full-sized mock-up of a futuristic Rohr design. Three of the four designs eventually won contracts and were built to varying degrees at the TTC; Garrett's wheeled vehicle started testing under jet power before the LIM reaction plate was installed, Grumman's vehicle was given an extensive 22-mile (35 km) track, but ran out of funding before the planned LIM reaction plate could be installed, and Rohr's vehicle was the last to arrive and received the least build-out with only a mile and a half of LIM-equipped track. Like the PRT systems, none of the TACV proposals would ever see commercial development.

British Rail also attended, bringing with them a full-sized mockup of the Advanced Passenger Train, at that point still powered by a gas turbine before its conversion to electric power. In another part of the British pavilion was a display by Tracked Hovercraft, which was starting tests on its track near Cambridge that year. The French exhibit included both the Aerotrain and recent developments of SNCFs high-speed efforts, which would emerge as the TGV.

== Mass transit ==
Although much of the show was organized to highlight the US's high-tech efforts, UMTA was also involved in a number of more "down to earth" projects, including the selection of new busses and trams for existing mass transit networks. Three major projects were ongoing, the US Standard Light Rail Vehicle (LRV); the State of the Art Car (SOAC), a prototype subway car that included all of the most modern features; and the Transbus urban mass transit bus.

Many of these were being worked on with Boeing Vertol, who showed both the prototype SOAC car and the design of their LRV. Similar vehicles were also being developed by other aviation firms, especially Rohr. Rohr was showing their own subway cars that were being produced for BART and the initial models of their proposals for the Washington Metro, as well as Transbus designs from their recently purchased Flxible bus division, who were working on what would emerge a few years later as the Flxible Metro.

The government's funding of the aerospace firms to present at Transpo led Pullman to pull out of the show, complaining that the government was "playing wasteful politics by needlessly fostering the entry of companies from the depressed aerospace industry into the rail transit equipment business."

Motor Coach Industries (MCI), a Canadian and U.S. bus manufacturer controlled by Greyhound Lines, used the show to introduce their MC-8 "Crusader" motorcoach, an intercity coach. The model became so popular with both large and small bus operators that General Motors lost its position as the major manufacturer of such buses in North America, exiting the market entirely in 1980, two years after MCI updated the product with its MC-9 model.

== Vehicle safety ==
The U.S. Federal Highway Administration (FHWA) was a major participant, including sponsorship of the "International Vehicle and Highway Safety Conference," featuring discussions on international cooperation in vehicle and highway safety. A major attraction at Transpo 72 was a consolidated International Experimental Safety Vehicle Exhibit at which twelve different experimental safety vehicles were displayed.

== Air show, fatal accidents ==
Three fatal accidents occurred at the air show.

The first accident involved a 'kite', i.e., a variety of hang glider that was being towed by a vehicle. The aircraft suffered a structural failure and collapsed, killing the pilot.

The second fatality occurred June 3 during a sport plane pylon race when, during a turn around a pylon, a trailing aircraft's wing and propeller hit the tip of the right wing of a leading aircraft, shearing the leading aircraft's wing off the fuselage. The damaged aircraft crashed almost instantly, killing the pilot, professional Air Racer Hugh C. Alexander of Louisville, GA

The third fatal accident occurred on June 4, the last day of the show. Overhead, jet fighters of the U.S. Air Force Thunderbirds, the Navy's Blue Angels and the Royal Air Force's Red Arrows performed dramatic aerial acrobatics. Tragically, the Thunderbirds experienced their first fatal crash at an air show. Major Joe Howard, flying Thunderbird 3 (Phantom F-4E s/n# 66-0321) experienced a loss of power during a vertical maneuver. Although Howard ejected as the aircraft fell back to earth from about 1,500 feet (460 m) tail first, and descended under a good canopy, winds blew him into the blazing crash site.

Transpo Trade/Airshows had been planned as recurring events here. Since these fatalities, there have been no other airshows at Dulles International Airport.

== Records ==
A balloon release of 100,000 balloons at Transpo '72 was the first balloon release to be included in the Guinness Book of World Records.

Howie Keefe set a world speed record for LA to DC in the P-51 Mustang Miss America, finishing at Dulles during the show.
