= List of automated transit networks suppliers =

This is a list of well-known automated transit networks suppliers.

== List of operational ATN systems ==
Currently, five advanced transit networks (ATN) systems are operational, and several more are in the planning stage.

| System | Manufacturer | Type | Locations | Guideway | Stations / vehicles | Notes |
|---|---|---|---|---|---|---|
| Morgantown PRT | Boeing Vertol | GRT^{[*]} | (United States) Morgantown, West Virginia, US (1975) | 13.2 km (8.2 mi) | 5 / 73 | Up to 20 passengers per vehicle, rides are not point-to-point during low usage periods |
| ParkShuttle | 2getthere | GRT^{[*]} | Rivium, the Netherlands (November 2005) | 1.8 km (1.1 mi) | 5 / 6 | 3rd generation GRT (Group Rapid Transit) vehicles accommodate up to 24 passengers (12 seated). The vehicles operate on-schedule during peak hours, at a 2.5 minute interval, and operate on demand during off-peak hours with passengers summoning a vehicle by pressing a button on the platforms. The third generation of vehicles, introduced in 2021, is designed to allow extension of the route on to ordinary roads running in mixed traffic. |
| CyberCab | 2getthere | PRT | (United Arab Emirates) Masdar City, Abu Dhabi, UAE (November 2010) | 1.5 km (0.9 mi) | 2 / 20 | Initial plans called for automobiles to be banned, with PRT as the only powered intra-city transport (along with an inter-city light rail line. In October 2010 it was announced the PRT would not expand beyond the pilot scheme due to the cost of creating the undercroft to segregate the system from pedestrian traffic. Plans now include electric cars and electric buses. In June 2013 a representative of the builder 2getthere said the freight vehicles had not been put into service because they had not worked out how to get freight to and from the three freight stations. |
| ULTra PRT | ULTra | PRT | * London Heathrow Airport, United Kingdom (June 2011) | 3.8 km (2.4 mi) | 3 / 21 | The Heathrow PRT system became operational in 2011, connecting Terminal 5 with a long-term car park. In May 2014 BAA said in a draft 5-year plan that it would extend the system throughout the airport but this was dropped from the final plan. |
| SkyCube | Vectus | PRT | * Suncheon, South Korea (September 2013) | 4.64 km (2.9 mi) | 2 / 40 | Connects the site of 2013 Suncheon Garden Expo Korea to a station in the wetlands "Buffer Area" next to the Suncheon Literature Museum; the line runs parallel to the Suncheon-dong Stream. Stations are "on-line." |

^{*} GRT stands for Group Rapid Transit which use larger capacity vehicles. Morgantown PRT and the ParkShuttle are quasi-PRT system because they lack some PRT features such as 100% on-demand service.

=== Commissioning pending ===
| System | Manufacturer | Type | Locations | Guideway | Stations / vehicles | Notes |
|---|---|---|---|---|---|---|
| ULTra PRT | ULTra Ultra-MTS | PRT | * Chengdu Tianfu International Airport, China (due to open 2021) | 4.8 km (3.0 mi) | 4 / 22 | In 2018 it was announced that a PRT system would be installed at the new Chengdu Tianfu International Airport to connect a remote car park to the terminals. The airport opened in June 2021 but it as of July 2021 is not clear if the PRT has opened. |

== List of automated transit networks (ATN) suppliers ==
The following table summarizes several well-known automated transit networks (ATN) suppliers based on a comprehensive list from 2020.

| Location | Supplier | Active? | Status | Capacity (seats+standing) | Guideway | Suspended/ supported | Propulsion |
|---|---|---|---|---|---|---|---|
| United States | Boeing Vertol / Alden Self-Transit Systems | No^{[*]} | Revenue service | 20 (8 + 12) | concrete | supported | rotary motors |
| United Kingdom | ULTra (1995- ) | Yes | Revenue service | 4 | concrete | supported, rubber wheeled | rotary motors |
| Netherlands | ParkShuttle III 2getthere (1995- ) | Yes | Revenue service | 24 (12+12) | roadway (asphalt/concrete) | supported, rubber wheeled | rotary motors |
| United Arab Emirates | CyberCab 2getthere (1995- ) | Yes | Revenue service | 4 | concrete | supported, rubber wheeled | rotary motors |
| South Korea | Vectus (TDI) | Yes | Revenue service | 6 | steel | supported | track mounted linear motors (prototype), rotary motors (S. Korea) |
| Mexico | Modutram (2009- ) | Yes | Full prototype test track | 6–8 | steel | supported, rubber wheeled | hybrid electric |
| Germany | Cabintaxi (1969–1979) | Yes^{[*]} | Full prototype test track (dismantled) | 3,12,18 | steel | both, solid rubber wheels | linear motors |
| United States | Swyft Cities (2018-) | Yes^{[*]} | Single seat prototype test track | | steel cable & steel curves/switch points | steel / rubber (?) | rotary motors |
| United States | Glydways (2016-) | Yes | Linear test track with station | 2 | roadway / concrete | supported, rubber wheeled | rotary motors |
| South Africa | Futran | Yes | Test track with bulk cargo vehicle | 6-8 | steel | suspended | rotary motors |
| United States | Solar Skyways (2012-) | Yes^{[*]} | half scale prototype vehicle and partial guideway, various scale models | ? | steel | suspended | ? |
| United States | Skytran (1990-) | Yes | mockup, bogie test track, partial test track | 2 | steel | suspended, magnetic levitation | linear motors |
| United States | JPods (2000-) | Yes | prototype vehicle and partial guideway | 1–6 | steel | suspended | rotary motors |
| France | UrbanLoop (2017- ) | Yes | Full prototype test track | 1,2 | steel | supported, rubber wheeled | rotary motors |
| United States | ecoPRT (2015- ) | Yes | prototype vehicle | 2 | steel | supported, rubber wheeled | rotary motors |
| Poland | Metrino PRT (MISTER) (2007- ) | Yes | prototype vehicle and partial guideway | 5 | steel | suspended | rotary motors |
| United States | Cybertran | Yes | prototype vehicle and scale models | 6 - 32 | steel wheels on steel rails | supported | rotary motors |
| United States | ROAM (1997- ) | Yes | Mockups of vehicle and guideway | 4 | stainless steel | supported, rubber wheels | electric motors |
| Japan | Zippar (2018- ) | Yes | mockup, partial test track | 1, 4 - 12 | steel for ropeway(Funitel), concrete for monorail | supported(ropeway), suspended(monorail) | electric motors |
| United States | RailPlane (2012- ) | Yes | scale model (dual mode) | ? | concrete | supported | rotary motors |
| United States | SNAAP (2016- ) | Yes | concept | ? | 1 | supported | ? |
| United States | Taxi 2000("SkyWeb Express") (1981–1993, 1999–2018) | No | prototype vehicle and partial guideway, scale models | 3 | steel | supported | linear motors |
| China | Tubenet Transit System (2001-2019?) | No | Full prototype test track | 2+child | steel (enclosed transparent tube) | supported | electric motors |
| Poland | EcoMobility (2009–2015) | No | Mockups (Full scale and half scale) and scale models | 4 | steel | supported | linear motors |
| Austria | Coaster (1999–2008) | No | Full prototype test track (dismantled) | 6 | steel | supported | rotary motors with rack and pinion |
| USA | Aerospace Corporation (1968–1976) | No | 1/10th scale model | 4 (model) (GRT analyzed) | steel/aluminium | supported | linear motors |
| USA | staRRcar (Alden Self-Transit Systems)^{[*]} | No | Full prototype test tracks (dual mode ^{[*]} & exclusive ROW) | 2 (dual mode),4,6 | concrete/steel | supported, rubber tires | rotary |
| United Kingdom | Cabtrack (Autotaxi) (1967–1972) | No | prototype test track^{[*]} and 1/5th scale model | 4 | concrete/steel | supported, rubber tires | rotary |
| USA | Transport Technology Inc (TTI) (1960s-1975) | No | prototype test track | 4,6 | concrete/steel | supported / air cushion | linear motor |
| Japan | CVS (1968–1983) | No | Full prototype test track (dismantled) | 4 | concrete | supported, rubber wheels | rotary motors |
| France | Aramis (1969–1987) | No | Full prototype test track (dismantled) | 4 / 10 | concrete | supported, rubber wheels | rotary motors |
| United States | PRT2000 (Raytheon) (1995–2000) | No | Full prototype test track (dismantled) | 4 | steel | supported | rotary motors |
| Australia | Austrans (1990–2006) | No | Full prototype test track (dismantled) | 9 | steel, steel wheels | supported | rotary motors |
| United States | Monocab/ROMAG, displayed at Transpo '72 (1969–1978) | No | Full prototype test track (dismantled) | 6 | concrete / steel | rubber wheels (Monocab), maglev (ROMAG) | rotary motor (Monocab), linear motor (ROMAG) |
| United States | Uniflo (1961–1973) | No | Full prototype test track (dismantled) | ? | ? | supported / air cushion | pneumatic mounted in guideway |
| United States | Mitchell Transit Systems (1967-2003?) | No | scale test tracks with 1 pax vehicle | 2 | steel | suspended and supported designs, rubber wheels | rotary motors mounted in guideway |
| India | AutoBots | Yes | analyzed + simulated + switch physics demo | 2 | steel | supported with vertical switch | hub motors |
| United States | Tri-Track | Yes | vehicle mockup. analyzed and simulated (dual mode)^{[*]} | 4 | concrete/aluminium | supported | linear motor/rotary motor. track assistance for acceleration |
| Sweden | GTS Foundation | Yes | analyzed and simulated | ? | ? | suspended | magnetic motors |
| Sweden | Beamways (2008-) | No | analyzed and simulated | 4 | steel | suspended, steel wheels for support, rubber wheel for traction | rotary motors |
| United States | PRT International (ITNS) | No | analyzed and simulated | ? | ? | supported | linear motors |
| France | Supraways (2015-) | Yes | Concept | 7–9 | steel | suspended | electric motors |
| Germany | Dromos (2019-) | Yes | Concept | 2 | roadway | supported | rotary motors |
| United States | Vuba (2018-) | Yes | Concept | ? | steel | suspended | rotary motors |
| United Kingdom | Beemcar | Yes | Concept | 4–5 | carbon composite | suspended | linear motors |
| United States | GlidewayPRT | Yes | Concept with patents | ? | steel | supported or suspended | ? |
| United States | Transit X (2015-) | Yes | Concept | 4–5 | ? | suspended | rotary motors |
| Sweden | Skycab | Yes | Concept | 4 | ? | supported, rubber wheels | electric motors |
| New Zealand | Skycabs | Yes | Concept | 16 (8 + 8) | ? | supported | ? |
| United States | Interstate Traveller | Yes | Concept | ? | ? | supported, magnetic levitation | ? |
| Denmark | RUF | Yes | Concept (dual mode)^{[*]} | ? | ? | supported | ? |
| Canada | Lofty Taxi | Yes | Concept | 2,4 | steel | both, steel wheeled | linear motors |
| Finland | BM Design-"BubbleMotion" (2010–2015) | No | Concept with patent application | 2–3 | steel round pipe | supported | rotary motors + track assistance on climbs |
| Russia | Transcar/Транскар | No | Concept with patents | 2 | steel | suspended | rotary motors |
| Sweden | Flyway | No | Concept | 1-30 | ? | suspended, rubber wheels | electric motors |
| Finland | Finland Techvilla | No | Concept | 4 | ? (enclosed transparent tube) | supported, rubber wheeled | rotary motors |
| Russia | Flexitaxi | No | Concept | ? | ? (enclosed transparent tube) | supported | pneumatic (vehicle in tube) or electromagnetic |
| United States | Pathfinder Systems | No | Concept / cabin mockup | 4–5 | steel, steel or concrete supports | suspended | rotary motors, battery powered |
| United States | Tesciro Guideways | Yes | Functional Full-scale / Traffic Control Software | 4–5 | Steel, Steel or Concrete Supports | Suspended | Permanent Magnet Motors, Fully Solar Powered |
| Norway | InnoTrans SporTaxi | No | Concept | ? | steel | supported, rubber wheels | rotary motors or linear motors |

^{*} Boeing Vertol's successors are not marketing the Morgantown PRT system and are no longer making transit vehicles .

^{*} CabinTaxi is not undergoing further development but a US firm holds rights to the patents and is marketing the system.

^{*} The Alden staRRcar system was the basis of the Morgantown PRT. However it also developed separate models.

^{*} The Cabtrack test track used battery powered vehicles but the production model was planned to have power supplied by a bus-bar in the guideway

^{*} Vehicles in "dual mode" systems can use the specialized guideway or ordinary roads.

^{*} Spartan Superway is a non-commercial, ongoing research program staffed by multi-disciplinary students organised by the engineering department of San Jose State University.

== See also ==
- Shweeb, a human powered suspended PRT design, which has a rideable prototype track in Rotorua, New Zealand.
