= Personal transport =

Personal transport may refer to:

- Personal transporter, a class of compact motorised ridable vehicle for transporting individuals
- Personal public transport, rental vehicles distributed and available without booking to the general public where users can determine the route and schedule
- Personal rapid transit (people mover), a public transport mode with small automated vehicles with low passenger capacity on a network of guideways
