= Atra =

Atra or ATRA may refer to:

== Places ==
- Atra, Estonia
- Hatra, an ancient city in modern-day Iraq

== Other uses ==
- Advanced Transit Association
- All-trans retinoic acid, or tretinoin, a medication
- American Taxpayer Relief Act of 2012
- American Tort Reform Association
- Atra razor, produced by the Global Gillette company
