= Unbuilt Rosemont personal rapid transit system =

In the 1990s, the Regional Transportation Authority (RTA) planned to fund the construction of a personal rapid transit (PRT) system in Rosemont, Illinois. Raytheon had been contracted to build the system. The project was cancelled in October 1999. Rosemont had been selected in 1993 by the RTA to be home to a demonstration PRT system. Five other municipalities in the suburban Chicago metropolitan area had submitted unsuccessful bids to be host to the PRT project. The system would have been the first-of-its-kind, utilizing smaller vehicles than the existing Morgantown Personal Rapid Transit. The project marked the first serious activity related to PRT construction since Morgantown Personal Rapid Transit.

== Overview of personal rapid transit ==
Personal rapid transit (PRT) describes systems of small, automated electric vehicles which operate on a network of specifically-built guideways (automated guideway transit). With personal rapid transit systems, all stations are located along sidings, allowing vehicles to avoid stopping at intermediate stations, running express between the boarding location and destination.

In the 1970s, the Morgantown Personal Rapid Transit system was constructed in Morgantown, West Virginia. The system's construction ran significantly over-budget, and was derided in the press as a white elephant. After the 1970s, serious action towards constructing further personal rapid transit systems ceased.

== RTA's announcement of plans for a prototype PRT system ==
In April 1990, Illinois' Regional Transportation Authority (RTA), a transit agency serving much of the Chicago metropolitan area, announced plans to construct a prototype personal rapid transit system in the Chicago suburbs. The system would have seen small computerized vehicles run on elevated guideways, traveling at headways of mere seconds and speeds of up to 30 miles per hour (48 km/h). The vehicles would carry passengers directly to their destination, bypassing intervening stations. The RTA leadership hoped that the technology could provide a solution to suburban traffic congestion.

The RTA was to fund the majority of the demonstration system's construction cost. The RTA president stated that they did not plan to seek federal funding, in order to avoid related bureaucracy. Criticisms of the planned project included questions as to whether it would be a wise use of millions of RTA dollars at a time when the agency was in financial trouble and needed a minimum of $5 billion in investments to address the needs of its existing rail and bus network.

Preliminary estimates provided to the RTA indicated that a PRT system could be constructed at a per mile cost approximately a quarter of the per mile cost of a traditional rail system.

The project marked the first serious activity related to PRT construction since Morgantown Personal Rapid Transit. The system would have been the first-of-its-kind, distinct from the existing Morgantown Personal Rapid Transit due to the fact that Morgantown's system utilized significantly larger vehicles. The larger vehicle size of the Morgantown Personal Rapid Transit has led some to consider it a "group rapid transit" (GRT) system, instead of a true personal rapid transit system.

== Selection of a location ==
The RTA solicited bids from Chicago suburbs to host the demonstration system. 22 suburbs initially expressed interest in hosting, and six suburbs (Addison, Deerfield, Lisle, Naperville, Rosemont, and Schaumburg) submitted formal proposals in March 1991.

Some of the bidding municipalities went as far as hiring public relations firms to promote their proposals. Deerfield, Lisle, Rosemont, and Schaumburg were selected as finalists in the bid process to host the system, while Addison was not. On April 15, 1993, the RTA board chose Rosemont by a 9 to 3 vote.

=== Addison proposal ===
Addison's proposal would have connected Pace bus routes to a growing industrial area in Addison, which employed approximately 25,000 employees.

=== Deerfield proposal ===
Deerfield proposed a 2.75-mile (4.43 km) route in the Lake-Cook Corridor, which would connect a new Lake Cook Road station of the Metra Milwaukee District North Line with office complexes and retail centers. Four stations would be located along the route's loop. Approximately 7,000 people were employed in the area along this initial loop, and a total of 24,500 individuals were employed in the overall Lake-Cook Corridor. Two future expansions were envisioned. A western expansion would have seen a 5.7-mile (9.2 km) spur loop constructed, serving major employment centers in both Deerfield and adjacent Northbrook around Lake-Cook Road and the Interstate 94 spur tollway. A 2.6-mile (4.2 km) eastern expansion would have built a loop connecting the system with Northbrook Court.

=== Lisle proposal ===
Lisle proposed a 2.5-mile (4.0 km) route connecting the Lisle station of the Metra BNSF Line with downtown Lisle, several office and research centers, the Hyatt-Lisle hotel, and the Lisle Auto Plaza complex of automobile dealerships. The route would have between seven and ten stations. Lisle's proposal identified three primary future expansions, and seven other potential future expansions to the system. The first of the three primary expansions would have been a 1.9-mile (3.1 km) expansion, extending the system westward to serve office developments along Warrenville Road, and connect to the Morton Arboretum. The second primary extension would have added a further 2.9-mile (4.7 km) section that would have crossed the East-West Tollway to serve offices and multifamily developments west along Warrenville Road. The village of Lisle discussed an openness to using to using a hotel-motel tax to help fund part of the expense of construction.

=== Naperville proposal ===
Naperville proposed a ten-station route circulating around the western side of the suburb. It would have connected with the Naperville station of the Metra BNSF Line (also served by Amtrak). It would have served retail, office, and residential areas.

=== Rosemont proposal ===
Rosemont's 3.5-mile (5.6 km) route would connect the Rosemont station of the CTA Blue Line to a variety of local developments, including hotels, and the Rosemont-O'Hare Exposition Center. The line would also be connected to a number of existing Pace bus lines. There would be a possibility to eventually expand it to connect with the Airport Transit System that was under construction at nearby O'Hare International Airport. Rosemont mayor Donald Stephens claimed that the major hotel operators in the city had indicated a willingness to contribute to funding the project. Rosemont officials declared that the PRT system could supplant the shuttles run by hotels and office complexes. Rosemont officials, and particularly mayor Stephens, had long desired for the village to have an internal transit system connecting the facilities that would be served by their proposed PRT route. An August 1992 study by Wilbur Smith and Associates indicated that, with a $2 ridership fee, daily boardings on Rosemont's proposed initial PRT segment would be 4,000, while ridership would be approximately 7,500 if there were no fare.

=== Schaumburg proposal ===
Schaumburg proposed a 2-mile (3.2 km) route which would link its proposed Pace bus depot to office centers, a hotel, and Woodfield Mall. The route would run to the west of Woodfield Mall. Schaumburg officials expressed a belief that local automobile traffic could be reduced by at least 10% by their proposed PRT route. Schaumburg's proposal received endorsements from neighboring Elk Grove Village, Hoffman Estates, and Palatine.

== Progress after the selection of the Rosemont proposal ==
The RTA considered proposals by two manufacturers, Stone & Webster and Intamin. In 1993, Raytheon took over the lead on Stone & Webster's proposal, focusing it on using its Taxi2000 technology. Intaimin's proposal was to have track switches used to direct the car, while Raytheon's proposal had routing instruments in the car. Raytheon's proposed PRT technology, called PRT 2000, was based on technology developed by J. Edward Anderson at the University of Minnesota. In 1993, RTA signed a contract with Raytheon to construct the personal rapid transit system, using the Taxi2000 technology. A major reason Taxi2000 technology was chosen over the system proposed by Intamin was that use of track switches was feared to be too slow, and potentially unsafe. The RTA voted to award the partnership of the Taxi 2000 Corporation and Raytheon Company an initial $18 million contract. The Taxi 2000 Company and Raytheon were to invest $20 million of their own money into the construction of a prototype system to test the technology's safety and reliability. The RTA would make their decision on whether to construct a system in Rosemont based upon the results of the tests.

A test track was constructed by Raytheon in Marlborough, Massachusetts, and tests were considered promising. The test track became operational in 1995.

By 1997, the system had been refined to a 3.4-mile (5.5 km) route featuring 7 stations. It would be served by 45 vehicles. It would have 3 power substations, and 15,000 square feet (1,400 m^{2}) of maintenance and control facilities. However, after studies of capital costs, the system was further revised to a 3-mile (4.8 km) route with six stations.

The system was to operate twenty hours a day, and was projected to see 2 million annual rider-trips, charging passengers $1 per trip. The system could be characterized as providing a collector service and a circulator service.

A new ridership forecast by Wilbur Smith and Associates found that, on weekdays without a show at Rosemont's convention center, ridership would be 5,530 in the initial year of operation. On weekdays with a public show at the convention center, ridership would be 5,840. On weekdays with a trade show at the convention center, ridership would be 6,650. The busiest station on the route was projected to be the one at the CTA station.

The project was ultimately estimated to have $124 million in construction costs. The RTA's leadership continued to say that they were not expecting federal funding.

Additionally, in the mid-90s, Schaumburg, which had unsuccessfully bid for the RTA's project, made its own plans to build a separate PRT system in its community.

== Cancellation of the project ==
The project died in October 1999, when Raytheon announced, to the surprise of the RTA, that they would be exiting the personal rapid transit business. Before this, estimated costs for the system had risen to US$50 million per mile, allegedly due to design changes that increased the weight and cost of the system relative to Anderson's original design. In 2000, rights to the technology reverted to the University of Minnesota, and were subsequently purchased by Taxi2000. This Taxi2000 company remained in existence until dissolving on March 13, 2018. The RTA had spent $22.5 million on the project before its cancellation. $18 million of this had gone into a construction of the prototype test track Raytheon built in Marlborough, Massachusetts. Raytheon claimed to have invested $45 million in the project. Another factor that contributed to the cancellation of the project was costs attributed with guideway construction. Shortly after Raytheon announced it would leave the PRT business, they expressed slight interest in still building the system. The system was never constructed.

== Additional reading ==
1991 proposals submitted by suburbs

- Deerfield proposal
- Lisle proposal
- Rosemont proposal
- Schaumburg proposal

Other documents

- TRB2000 Publication Figures (Yoder)
- 1991 Regional Transit Authority briefing book on personal rapid transit
