= J. Edward Anderson =

American engineer (1927–2026)

John Edward Anderson (May 15, 1927 – February 3, 2026) was an American engineer and proponent of personal rapid transit.

== Background and career ==
Anderson was born in China on May 15, 1927. His family returned to the United States in the 1930s. He obtained a BS from Iowa State University and a master's from the University of Minnesota - both in the field of mechanical engineering. He also earned a Ph.D. in astronautics from the Massachusetts Institute of Technology. In 1971, he became a full professor at University of Minnesota and has been a professor of Aerospace and Mechanical Engineering at Boston University.

He was also a member of the Advanced Transit Association board of Directors from its founding in 1976. Anderson was elected in 2001 as Fellow of the American Association for the Advancement of Science.

Anderson died on February 3, 2026, at the age of 98.

== Personal Rapid Transport ==
Anderson first worked on methods of structural analysis of supersonic-aircraft wings at the Structures Research Division of NACA (now NASA), and later designed aircraft instruments, including the first transistorized amplifier used in a military aircraft for the Aeronautical Division of Honeywell.

In 1963 he joined the Mechanical Engineering Department at the University of Minnesota, and directed its Industrial Engineering Division. He chaired a symposium on the role of science and technology in society, coordinated a 15-professor task force on New Concepts in Urban Transportation, and chaired three international conferences on personal rapid transit (PRT), following which he was elected first president of ATRA.

He consulted on PRT planning for many organizations, and for several years he was Distinguished Lecturer for the American Institute of Aeronautics and Astronautics. At one point, he discussed PRT with President Richard Nixon's staff. Anderson reportedly said of Nixon, "[Nixon] didn’t know anything about it, but we spent quite a bit of time talking to his staff."

Anderson was chosen as lead consultant to plan an automated transit system for Indianapolis, and selected the German-built Cabinentaxi—a three-person vehicle that travels below its elevated rail in one direction and on top of it in the other. Anderson was later hired by the German builder of Cabinentaxi to act as U.S. representative, until the company abandoned work on the idea.

In 1983 Anderson co-founded Automated Transportation Systems, Inc., with two officials of the University of Minnesota. The company was renamed Taxi 2000 Corporation in 1986. While teaching in the late 1980s at the Department of Aerospace and Mechanical Engineering at Boston University, Anderson organized a team of engineers from major Boston-area firms to participate in developing the PRT system.

In 1989, the Northeastern Illinois RTA initiated a program to fully develop PRT, leading to a $40M joint development program with Raytheon Company and the RTA. Massachusetts-based Raytheon purchased the rights to the Taxi 2000 technology in 1993 and developed its own version of the system concept, which it named "PRT 2000".

Raytheon developed a PRT 2000 test track and produced three vehicles which were up and running in 1995 in Marlborough, Massachusetts in a joint project with the Northeastern Illinois RTA. However, Raytheon terminated the PRT 2000 project and Phase III was never started.

He became part of the effort by a committee of the business-civic group Forward Quest to install a Taxi 2000-based PRT system, the Sky Loop, into the Cincinnati area. The Sky Loop plan was submitted to the Ohio-Kentucky-Indiana Regional Council of Governments (OKI), but the proposal was ultimately rejected by OKI's Central Area Loop Study Committee.

In 2002, Anderson began selling shares in the privately held Taxi 2000, and on April 10, 2003, he unveiled the Taxi 2000 (Skyweb Express) prototype to the public and the media.

Anderson also sought public funding for PRT research and development but bills to subsidize a testing facility for Taxi 2000 were never approved. On March 8, 2004, Anderson appeared at a meeting of the Midtown Greenway Coalition board to support a proposal for that project, but in June 2004 the Midtown Greenway board endorsed a streetcar over his proposal.

He left Taxi 2000 Corporation in 2005 to start a personal rapid transit consulting firm called *PRT International. He was sued by the Taxi 2000 Corporation in April of that year, alleging he had retained proprietary information from Taxi 2000, along with a company computer. The suit was settled in December 2005.

== Arms control ==
Anderson was active in opposing deployment of the MX missile in new protective silos. Support for MX was based on claims by defense officials that a "window of vulnerability" existed in the Minuteman missile system—that the Soviet Union could achieve first-strike capability. Alarmed at Defense Secretary Caspar Weinberger's announcement that the U.S. intended to seek such capability for itself, Anderson believed that data showing danger of Soviet first-strike capability was greatly exaggerated. He authored seven papers between 1979 and 1983 opposing MX, in which he maintained there was no "window of vulnerability," due to known margins of error in the reliability, accuracy and testing of missile systems. He also founded a program called International Peace Issues Forum, for students to discuss arms control and disarmament issues. As recently as 2004 the group Minnesota Alliance of Peacemakers listed Anderson as a member of Citizens for Global Solutions who is available to do public speaking on the subject of arms control.

== Patents ==
(selected chronological list)

- TANK UNIT, U.S. patent 2,916,679 - Filed April 30, 1954. Fuel level sensing system.
- AUTOMATIC PILOT SERVOSYSTEM, U.S. patent 2,944,203 - Filed February 24, 1958.
- PENDULOUS GYROSCOPIC ACCELEROMETERS, U.S. patent 3,162,052 - Filed September 6, 1962. Gimballess inertial reference system.
- SWITCH MECHANISM, U.S. patent 4,522,128 - Filed January 10, 1983. Vehicle-borne switch for PRT.
