= Délégation interministérielle à l'aménagement du territoire et à l'attractivité régionale =

Coordinates: 48.8728°N 2.3155°E

The délégation interministérielle à l'aménagement du territoire et à l'attractivité régionale (English: Interministerial Delegation of Land Planning and Regional Attractiveness) or DATAR was a French administration working for the Minister of Territorial Development. It applied decisions taken by the Interministerial Committee of Land Planning and Development (CIADT).

It was created in 1963 by Georges Pompidou's government.

In 2009, DATAR handed over its missions to the Commissariat général à l’égalité des territoires (English: General Commission for Equal Territories).

== Different names ==
When created in 1963, the DATAR is named "Délégation à l'aménagement du territoire et à l'action régionale" (Land Development and Regional Action Delegation). In 2005, it changed to "Délégation interministérielle à l'aménagement et à la compétitivité des territoires" (DIACT; Interministerial Delegation of Planning and Territorial Competitiveness). In 2009, it became DATAR.

== Actions performed by the DATAR ==
The DATAR insisted in the 70's that the SNCF build a new railway station on the LGV Sud-Est, near Montchanin : this station would become the Gare du Creusot TGV.

In the 70's, the DATAR gives funds Matra Transport to launch the development of ARAMIS, a personal rapid transit project.

In the 80's, the DATAR launches a Mission photographique, whose goal is to know better the French territory by taking thousands of photographs. Most of those photographs are stored in the Bibliothèque nationale de France.

In 1965, the DATAR gives funds to Jean Bertin to help him create his company, the "Société d'Etude de l'Aérotrain", which aims to build a new hovercraft train.
