= Alden staRRcar =

Personal rapid transit type

The Alden staRRcar, short for "Self-Transport Road and Rail Car", was a personal rapid transit (PRT) system designed by William Alden in the 1960s. It originally envisioned small electrically powered cars suitable for short-distance trips at low speed within urban areas, which could optionally merge onto tracks that would provide power and guidance for high-speed travel over longer inter-city distances. It was one of the earliest dual-mode vehicles to be proposed, and one of the earliest to be actually built.

Over its lifetime the design changed dramatically, originally a four-person vehicle with dual-mode operation but eventually emerging as a much larger people mover for 20 people. In this form, Boeing Vertol was awarded a construction contract in 1970 to build a demonstration system in Morgantown, West Virginia. A smaller system was also built by their licensee, Kobe Steel, and installed at the Expo '75 on Okinawa (as well as the more advanced CVS). The Morgantown Personal Rapid Transit system first opened for service in 1975, and with the exception of a closure for a major expansion, has remained in service since then.

== History ==
=== Original design ===
William Alden, a graduate of the Harvard Business School, started Alden Self-Transit Systems Corporation around 1955. His idea was to design a "dual-mode" transit system – small cars that operated like traditional electric cars when driven around town for short distances, but allowed long-distance travel via automated guideways that provided power. The vehicles were quite lightweight because they could only travel at low speeds when manually guided and didn't need full crash safety or large battery packs. On the guideways they travelled much faster; they were protected from collisions by the automated guideway, and conductors on the guideway provided the power needed for high speeds while also recharging the batteries for local travel at the destination. Alden envisioned guideways being built in place of the existing interstate roads, but the automatic guidance allowed for much shorter headways and thereby increased route capacity, reducing the need for multiple lanes.

The initial design evolved into small four-person cars that were tested on a guideway set up in a parking lot in Bedford, Massachusetts. The staRRcar testbeds, models 19 and 20, were built on top of a rectangular steel chassis with very small rubber wheels that resulted in a ride close to the ground. The wedge-shaped lightweight body shell was placed on top, and the rear of the vehicle was a single piece of glass providing an unobstructed view. Two small wheels, normally hidden from view, extended from the side of the vehicle when entering a guideway, pressing against the sides to provide guidance. The movement of the wheels turned the front wheels to smoothly follow curves. Walter Cronkite featured the staRRcar on the CBS show "The Twentieth Century" in 1966.

During development, they realized that developing a single-mode vehicle would be much less expensive. The existing system was adapted into a larger six-person vehicle that was essentially a fiberglass box on top of a larger version of the same basic chassis, 10 feet long, 6 wide and 4 1/2 tall. The roof section slid open along with the doors on the side of the vehicle, allowing passengers to enter standing upright. Full-scale testing of this system took place in 1968 on a test track in Bedford, while a smaller 1/20th scale model with ten vehicles and four off-line stations was used to test the guidance and scheduling systems.

=== Proposal for 'Expo 76' in Boston ===
In 1969, as the transportation system for the Boston's bid to host "Expo 76" for the United States Bicentennial, Alden Self-Transit Systems proposed a PRT system with 5,500 vehicles and 33 stations. Vehicles were 6 feet long, carried 6 passenger and ran at 15mph with 2,537 cars per guideway per hour. There were also 200 special purpose vehicles for police, medical and VIPs. System capacity was estimated at 360,000 passengers per hour. There were to be 6 route miles in a large, X-shaped network – but each route was composed of parallel guideways with the widest route being 70 feet across with 8 parallel vehicle paths. To speed loading and unloading stations would have had platforms that moved at 1.5mph to increase capacity. The largest central station was supposed to handle 133,100 passengers per hour. Stations would also have some stopping platforms. The design for the expo – to be built in Boston Harbour – was developed using the PRT system; however, it was never built as Boston lost the bid to Philadelphia.

=== Morgantown ===
Professor Samy Elias of the Industrial Engineering Department at West Virginia University in Morgantown had been pressing for the development of a PRT system for their campus since the late 1960s. Elias was able to obtain $50,000 from UMTA for a comparative study of three different types of PRT systems: Monocab, Dashaveyor and the Alden staRRcar. The staRRcar won the selection contest and the newly formed Department of Transportation (DOT) chose the Morgantown proposal as a testbed system.

At the time the Apollo Program was winding down and Richard Nixon was in the process of extracting the country from the Vietnam War. There was considerable concern about the health of the aerospace industry, which would be losing two of its major funding sources at the same time. As a result, the newly formed Department of Transport was under intense pressure to build a working system before the elections of 1972.

When the DOT visited Alden they concluded they were too small to be trusted with the deployment phase of the project, and arranged for Boeing Vertol to take over as the prime contractor, working with the Jet Propulsion Laboratory who provided project management. A test system was set up starting in 1970, and after extensive development construction of the Morgantown system started in 1974.

The Morgantown PRT opened for service the next year and has operated continuously since then except for a short period in 1978 for a major expansion. Although derided at the time as a "white elephant", the system has operated for over 40 years and has proven itself a valuable asset to the city. The mayor, Ronald Justice, stated: "We're a small town with big traffic issues, and the P.R.T. could be the reason we're able to continue our growth." There have been several expansion plans during that time, which would about double the system size to about 15 miles.

In spite of the eventual success of the Morgantown system, changes to the funding system within the DOT and UTDC led to little follow-on interest, and it remains the only on-demand PRT system currently operating in commercial service.

=== After Morgantown ===
Interest in PRT systems "dried up" after Morgantown, due to cutbacks in federal funding and huge budget overruns in the Morgantown installation. Alden moved his company into automated machining systems, working with large companies like Corning. He sold this company to an employee in 1983. After a short time in retirement, Alden "got restless" and decided to re-enter the mass transit world. His latest company, Alden DAVe Systems ("Dual-mode Autonomous Vehicle"), is pitching a new dual-mode vehicle to local universities and as a transit system for a large movie studio in California. Unlike older systems, DAVe does not require a separate guideway for low-speed portions of the network and can self-guide amongst pedestrians.

== See also ==
- Road–rail vehicle
