= Computer-controlled Vehicle System =

The Computer-controlled Vehicle System, almost universally referred to as CVS, was a personal rapid transit (PRT) system developed by a Japanese industrial consortium during the 1970s. Like most PRT systems under design at the same time, CVS was based around a small four-person electric vehicle similar to a small minivan that could be requested on demand and drive directly to the user's destination. Unlike other PRT systems, however, CVS also offered cargo vehicles, included "dual-use" designs that could be manually driven off the PRT network, and included the ability to stop at intersections in a conventional road-like network.

Work on CVS started in the late 1960s as a demonstration system for a "traffic game" at Expo '70. This demonstration was successful and led to a further development project in 1970, which expanded several times and eventually produced a large test track outside of Tokyo. However, in 1978, the Ministry of Land, Infrastructure and Transport declined to grant CVS a license under existing safety regulations, citing issues with the short headway distances. As other proposed CVS deployments also dried up, work on the project ended some time that year.

== History ==
=== Background ===
The concept of personal rapid transit (PRT) developed in the 1950s as a solution to the problem of providing mass transit in smaller urban areas and the suburbs of larger cities. Existing systems, heavy rail and subways, required major infrastructure and had high capital costs that limited their use to only the densest urban areas. Buses could run on existing roadways, but were thus subject to traffic problems and could not offer the high-speed services that made subways so attractive to riders. Modern PRT really began around 1953 when Donn Fichter, a city transportation planner, began research on PRT and alternative transportation methods. In 1964, Fichter published a book, which proposed an automated public transit system for areas of medium to low population density.

The solution appeared to be a "mini-subway", one that was small enough that the routes did not require the same sort of capital costs as a conventional system. However, using traditional technology to implement such a system would not work, as the required distance between vehicles on a subway system, known as headway, was often several minutes. This would mean a low vehicle density, and, if this was combined with a small number of passengers per vehicle, a very low overall passenger capacity. If such a system was to be practical, the distance between the vehicles had to be reduced, something that the emerging computer market appeared able to address.

During the 1950s the United States underwent a period of intense urban decay. Planners pointed to the construction of the interstate highway system as the culprit; people were able to buy houses at low prices farther and farther from their jobs in the downtown cores, leading to a flight of capital out of the cities. Only those cities with well-developed mass transit systems, like New York and Boston, seemed to be avoiding these problems. If mass transit was the solution, there was a need for a system that could be built in smaller cities at reasonable prices. This led, naturally, to the PRT concept.

PRT development was given a major boost in 1967 with the start of what would be delivered as the "HUD reports", a series of industry studies funded by the US Department of Housing and Urban Development (HUD), which gave strong support to the PRT concept. The publication of the reports in 1968 as Tomorrow's Transportation sparked off a wave of developments around the world, as it appeared PRT was going to be "the next big thing". By the early 1960s there were dozens of PRT efforts underway, with a wide variety of solutions from what were essentially small subway systems to more complex systems that the HUD reports referred to as "dial-a-cab".

=== Traffic Game ===
As part of the Expo '70 program in Osaka, starting in 1968 a university and industry team built a "traffic game" in the Automobile Industries Pavilion. The network consisted of a grid of guideways on a 5-metre (16 ft) grid carrying ten two-seat electrically powered cars. The cars communicated with a central computer using wires under the "roadway", which allowed the computer to start and stop the vehicles at the intersections if there was crossing traffic. If there wasn't, the vehicles could travel through the intersection non-stop. This greatly increases passenger throughput by eliminating unneeded stops that occur on a fixed-schedule system (like traffic lights), increasing the average vehicle speed.

In spite of being a show floor demonstration system, the system was quite advanced compared to most PRT systems then under study. Most systems had been designed in the era of Generation II computers (the PDP-8 was common), which were large and relatively slow. These systems normally limited themselves to planning the route in a fixed network with no stops, which greatly simplified the routing task. Vehicles on the network were assumed to be running at a fixed speed or stopped completely in emergencies, there were no on-route stops that could complicate timing. This meant that the guideway network could not be built into existing infrastructure like roads where there are stops at crossing points along the route, stations had to be built "off-line" to allow other vehicles to pass by at full speed.

The "traffic game" demonstration system was much more flexible. The computer system knew the location of all of the vehicles at all times, and was able to speed up and slow down vehicles as needed at fixed points in the network. This meant the guideway system could be built in a fashion much more similar to conventional roadways, without the need to separate tracks at crossing points, or building offline stations. Although these types of infrastructure would improve performance of the system, in areas of less demand or traffic they could be eliminated to save on capital costs.

When the "traffic game" was system successful the designers suggested that a similar but more complex system be presented at the 18th Tokyo Motor Show late in 1971. A formal presentation was submitted to the Ministry of International Trade and Industry (MITI) in July 1970, and accepted that autumn. Built between April and October 1971, the new system used 1:20th scale cars on a network representing the 300-metre wide (980 ft) area of the Ginza district in Tokyo, with the centralized computer system able to control up to 1,000 vehicles.

=== CVS ===
Following the successful demonstration at the Tokyo Motor Show, MITI provided funding for development of a full-sized version of the same system at Higashimurayama, built on top of an existing car test track and former racetrack. Several other Japanese companies were already in the process of developing PRT systems, either self-designed or using licensed US designs, but the "traffic game" design, with its crossing guideway network and ability to deal with traffic made it uniquely advanced.

Basic track layout was completed by the middle of 1972 and construction of the short guideway section for the maintenance yard was completed by that autumn. Testing of frameless chassis started soon after. Construction of the rest of the track was completed by the autumn of 1973. The test track was 2 km (1.2 mi) long and about 200 m (660 ft) across, in the form of a large oval loop. In the center of the loop was a grid of crossing lines and several passenger stations at a 100 m (330 ft) spread, along with the maintenance and control facilities. The top portion of the loop was used for high-speed tests, while the bottom included two parallel tracks for lane-changing experiments. In total, the track contained 4.8 km (3.0 mi) of guideway.

The system originally envisioned a 100-vehicle mixed fleet, but rampant inflation in the 1970s led to budget cutbacks that were made good by reducing the fleet to 60. The basic passenger vehicle emerged as a four-person design that looked like a minivan with no "hood" area for the engine. Since the emergency braking was extremely powerful, passengers were seated facing to the rear, and Japanese law already precluded standing in automated vehicles. In some versions, two of the four seats could be folded to allow larger loads, like prams or bicycles. CVS also tested light cargo vehicles, carrying between 300 and 400 kg (650 and 900 lb). Three types of cargo bodies were tried; a flatbed version for palleted cargo that was loaded using two conveyor belts on a trackside "station", another was similar to a pickup truck with a box end, and the last was an enclosed postal van.

CVS also developed a dual-mode version of the vehicle, which they demonstrated at Expo '75 on Okinawa in July 1975. This version allowed potential customers to purchase a vehicle and drive it like a normal car for short distances at low speeds using battery power. For longer distances and higher speeds, the car would be driven onto the guideway, which would provide the higher power and automated guidance needed for higher speeds. Expo also hosted a larger group rapid transit system from Kobe Steel, which was a licensed version of the Alden staRRcar being built by Boeing Vertol.

=== Cancellation ===
A two-phase testing program was carried out. Phase I was the basic construction and operation at various speeds with large headways, in order to work on the mechanical design. This phase completed in 1976, and was followed by Phase II, a "system demonstration" at one-second headways (considerably less than a car). Phase II testing completed in 1978 and the consortium started looking for deployment opportunities, developing a serious proposal for an installation in Baltimore.

However, CVS ran into the same difficulties as the many other PRT systems of the era. A combination of lowering gas prices, changes in attitudes toward major public projects of this size, and cost overruns in the demonstration system in Morgantown, and a lack of progress within the Urban Mass Transit Administration in the US all led to a souring of opinion for PRT systems. For example, the California Public Utilities Commission states that its rail regulations apply to PRT, and these require railway-sized headways. The degree to which CPUC would hold PRT to "light rail" and "rail fixed guideway" safety standards is not clear because it can grant particular exemptions and revise regulations. Although by this point in time there were numerous fully developed systems ready to be installed, a lack of interest and funding meant no new PRT systems were installed, and only the much larger Canadian Bombardier ART and French VAL systems saw any deployment projects during the 1980s.

J. Edward Anderson, a long-time PRT advocate and critic, noted that the guideway was very large and had a major visual impact. However, many other systems used similar or larger guideways, including the Morgantown PRT, and the guideway was smaller than a conventional roadway. He also noted that the stations only had a single berth, which would limit capacity, and that the vehicles had a rough ride (they were unsprung).

== Description ==
CVS vehicles were built like contemporary vans, with a chassis holding the mechanical systems with a metal monocoque body placed on top. They were 3 m (9.8 ft) long, 1.6 m (5 ft 3 in) wide and 1.85 m (6 ft 1 in) high, and weighted about 1 tonne (1.1 tons). Motive power was provided by a conventional 200 VAC electric motor driving the rear wheels, which also provided regenerative braking at up to 0.2 g (2.0 m/s^{2}; 6.4 ft/s^{2}). Conventional brakes could increase this to 0.4 g (3.9 m/s^{2}; 13 ft/s^{2}). Emergency stopping at up to 2 g (20 m/s^{2}; 64 ft/s^{2}) could be provided through an explosively fired device. The standard four-seat passenger vehicle weighed 900 kilograms (2,000 lb).

The guideway consisted of parallel steel I-beams providing the running surface, with a third steel channel running down the middle of the two providing the guide rail, emergency stopping surface, vehicle power and communications. Due to the rubber-on-steel running surfaces, the maximum climbing grade was about 10 degrees, and would be reduced in wet or snowy weather. In good weather the vehicles normally ran at 40 km/h (25 mph) in the low-speed sections, but could run as high as 80 km/h (50 mph) in high-speed sections.

Vehicle control used a moving block control system, similar to those used on automated railways. Each vehicle had a small computer on board that communicated with the external scheduling systems every 1/2 second or less, sending in its current position with a resolution of less than 2 m (6 ft 7 in). The position was measured by small spiral antennas running in the guide track, which also send position information to the scheduling computers at 1,200 bit/s over an inductive loop in the track.

In addition to the "quantum" computers on the vehicles, three separate control systems were tested; Hitachi built a system for control at high speed on the outer loop based on a HIDIC-350 computer, allowing speeds up to 60 km/h (37 mph), Toshiba provided a system based on the TOSBAC-40 that ran the lower-speed network area at speeds under 40 km/h (25 mph), and Fujitsu added a third system based on the FACOM 230-35 that supervised the other two and switched traffic between them.

Vehicles normally operated at a one-second headway, meaning a single lane could carry as many as 3,600 vehicles per hour, for 14,400 seats per hour. In operation it was expected to operate at about 1/3 this capacity. This placed CVS right in the middle of the PRT/GRT spectrum, between busses that normally deliver about 3,000 passengers per hour per direction (pphpd) and conventional subways which operate around 50,000 pphpd.

== Bibliography ==
=== References ===
- AGT, United States Congress Office of Technology Assessment (May 1975). Automated Guideway Transit: An Assessment of PRT and Other New Systems (1975 ed.). United States Congress Office of Technology Assessment. ISBN 1-4289-2517-1.
- Boyle, Daniel K. (2006). Fixed-Route Transit Ridership Forecasting and Service Planning Methods (2006 ed.). Transportation Research Board National Resear. ISBN 0-309-09772-X. - Total pages: 50
- Bradbury, Katharine L.; Downs, Anthony; Small, Kenneth A. (January 1982). Urban decline and the future of American cities (1982 ed.). Brookings Institution Press. ISBN 0-8157-1053-4. - Total pages: 309
- Fichter, Donn (1964). Individualized Automatic Transit and the City (1964 ed.). Providence, RI. - Total pages: 162
- Haar, Charles; Cole, Leon; Merritt, Harold. Tomorrow's Transportation: New Systems for the Urban Future (PDF) (May, 1968 ed.). U.S. Department of Housing and Urban Development.
- Ishii, Takemochi; Iguchi, Masakazu; Koshi, Masaki & Translated by Yamashita, Akita. CVS: Computer-controlled Vehicle System (PDF) (1975 ed.). Reports of the Third International PRT Conference. Archived from the original (PDF) on 2012-08-03. - pg. 77-83
