= Aramis (personal rapid transit) =

French experimental personal rapid transit system

Coordinates: 48.838817°N 2.271253°E

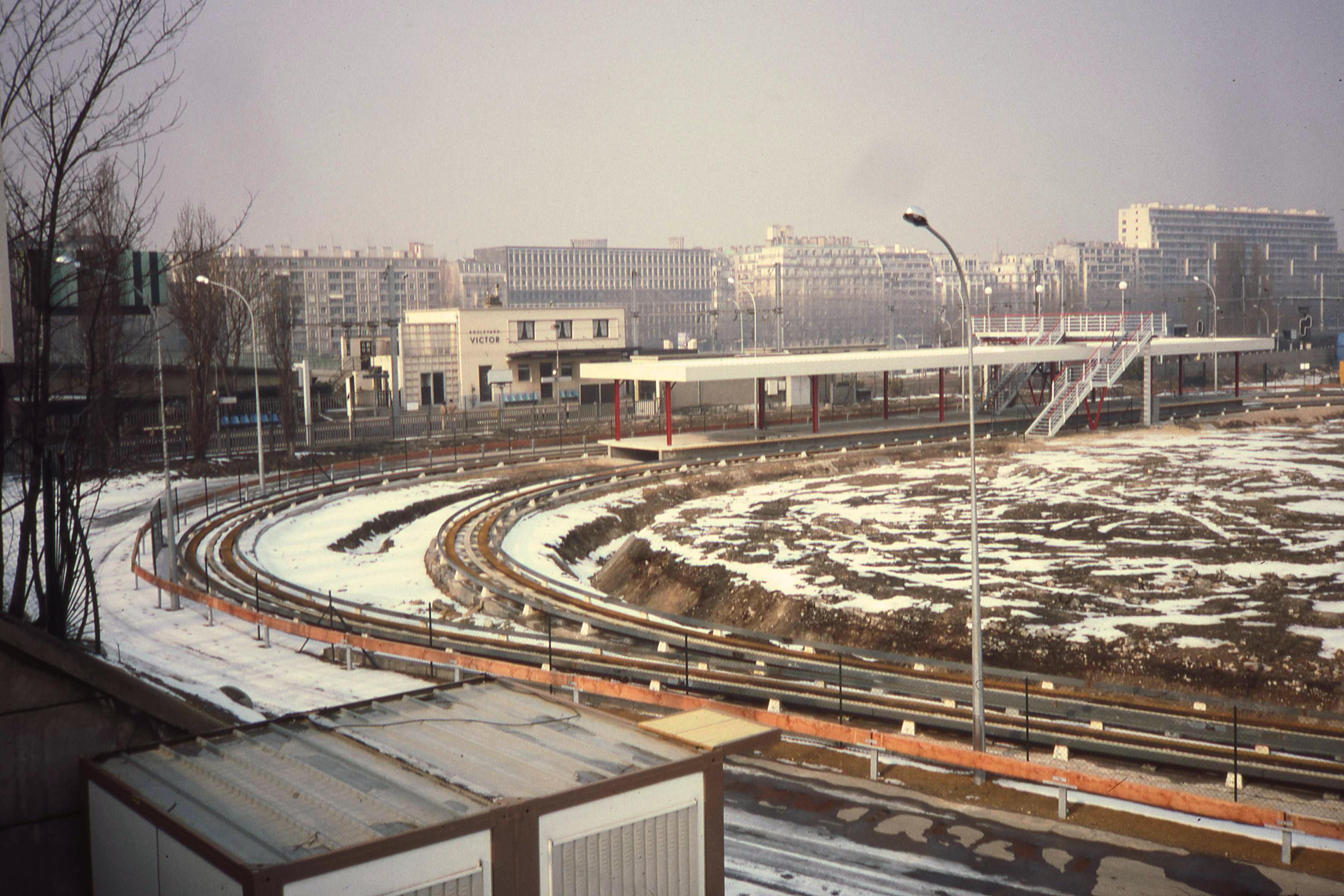
ARAMIS test track by the Gare de Boulevard Victor, Paris

The Aramis (Note: French: Agencement en Rames Automatisées de Modules Indépendants dans les Stations; English: Automated trains of independent modules in Stations.) was an experimental personal rapid transit (PRT) system developed in France for deployment in the Paris area. Aramis included the unique feature of non-mechanical platooning that allowed the small cars to run as virtual trains in areas of higher transit density. This would allow the system to maintain high throughput in busy areas, with the trains breaking up into individual cars and going their separate ways as they approached their destination. In spite of considerable development, the platooning system was never made to work properly, and the cars tended to bump and jar in testing. The project was eventually shut down in November 1987, its place taken by the conventional Véhicule Automatique Léger system developed through the same period.

Phase 0 of Aramis began in 1969. During Phase 0, the patent was processed, a test site was determined, and the Aramis development committee was created. Phase 1 started in 1974. During Phase 1, more test sites were researched, variable-reluctance motor was developed and Aramis' competition was eliminated. Phase 2a began in 1977. During Phase 2a, Aramis was simplified for economic reasons. Phase 3A started in 1978, and during phase 3A tests of the system's main components were run, and more site analyses took place at test locations. Phase 3B was the final phase for Aramis; it started in 1982. During the report for phase 3B, Aramis looked like it was in good shape; however, at the end of phase 3B Aramis was abandoned.

Technical development was conducted by "Engins Matra" company, which then became Matra Transport (and later absorbed by Siemens under the same "Siemens Transportation Systems", now a part of Siemens mobility). The project was financed by the French agency DATAR (French: délégation interministérielle à l'aménagement du territoire et à l'attractivité régionale; English: Inter-ministerial Delegation for Territorial Planning and Regional Attractiveness).

The project met with various failures, for both social and technological reasons. In Bruno Latour's book on the subject, Aramis, or the Love of Technology, the author explores the various shortcomings that led to the stillbirth of the project. The original intention for Aramis was to be an ideal urban transportation system based on private cars in constant motion and the elimination of unnecessary transfers. This new form of transportation was intended to be as secure and inexpensive as collective transportation.

The proposed system had custom-designed motors, sensors, controls, digital electronics, software and a major installation (the "CET") in southern Paris. The demonstration of the technology in 1970 was a success. What set Aramis apart from other personal rapid transit projects were non-material couplings. Non-material couplings were linking elements that would allow each vehicle to be self-contained, while moving in unison. Unlike trains, individual Aramis were not physically attached.

The 1972 prototype featured a piece of track 800–1000 meters long, a fixed station, a movable station that would have included a workshop, a control post, a reception building, a parking lot, and five full scale cars (two for passengers, three reserved for measuring instruments).

Social concerns made the development of Aramis difficult; the safety of passengers was at risk because of the lack of security in private cars.

Point-to-point travel for passengers, an essential feature of Personal Rapid Transit, was removed from the specifications around 1973 because of the extra cost of the turnouts.

== Bibliography ==
- Aramis or the Love of Technology, by Bruno Latour (Harvard University Press, 1996) ISBN 0-674-04323-5
