= Cabinentaxi =

Unrealised 1970s German people mover project

Coordinates: 51°22′31.19″N 7°24′54.87″E

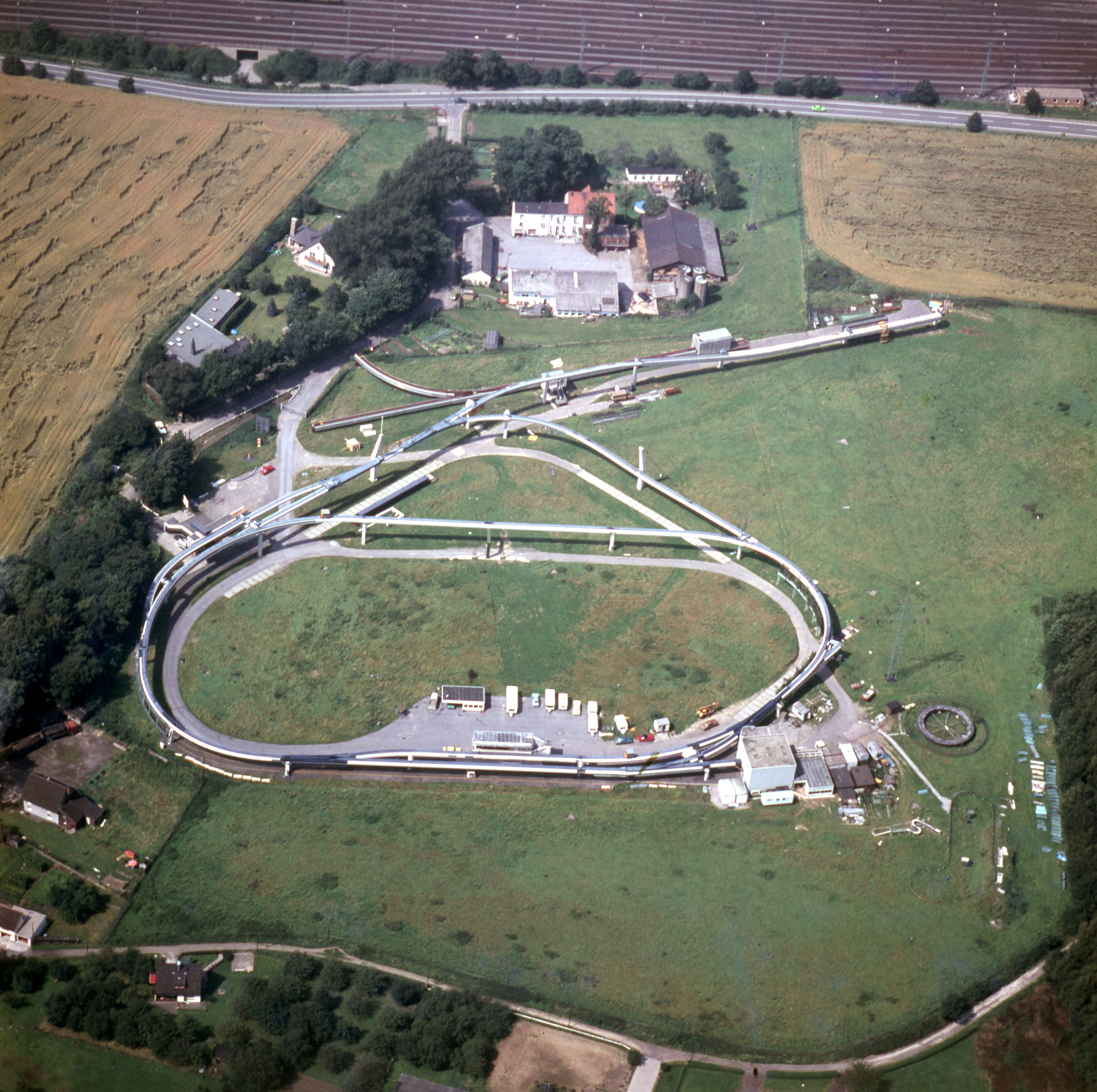
Cabinentaxi test track in Hagen, Germany, in 1978

Cabinentaxi, sometimes Cabintaxi in English, was a German people mover development project undertaken by Demag and Messerschmitt-Bölkow-Blohm with funding and support from the Bundesministerium für Forschung und Technologie (BMFT, the German Ministry of Research and Development). Cabinentaxi was designed to offer low-cost mass transit services where conventional systems, like a metro, would be too expensive to deploy due to low ridership or high capital costs.

Cabinentaxi systems could be operated in a variety of fashions depending on the need. It is most widely known as the first true personal rapid transit (PRT) system, where customers call up a small "car" on demand which then takes them directly to their destination without any stops along the way. The system could also be used in a group rapid transit (GRT) fashion, using larger cars with up to 18 passengers. In this case the vehicles would travel along a fixed route, stopping at any station that a passenger requested. Cabinentaxi could also mix the two modes on a single line, which allowed direct routing to high-density areas when traffic loads were low, saving the larger van-like vehicles for the high-demand periods.

Cabinentaxi was in serious consideration for two deployments in the late 1970s; BMFT was in the process of funding a deployment in Hamburg while their U.S. counterpart, the Urban Mass Transit Authority (UMTA), selected it as a front-runner for a deployment in Detroit. Cabinentaxi's corporate partners decided to pull out of the Detroit competition to focus on the Hamburg development. When unrelated budget cuts drained the BMFT's coffers, the Hamburg project was also canceled, and the Cabintaxi Joint Venture gave up on the public transit field and withdrew the Cabintaxi technology from the market. The rights were purchased in 1985 by a small U.S. consortium, Cabintaxi Corporation, but no developments have followed. The only commercial use was a modified system, the Cabinlift, which operated as a horizontal elevator between buildings at the Schwalmstadt-Ziegenhain hospital in Germany until 2002.

== History ==
=== Background ===
In the early 1950s, urban planner Donn Fichter started work on a book that would eventually emerge in 1964 as Individualized Automatic Transit and the City. Fitcher argued that the only way to solve the gridlock problems in cities being caused by increased car ownership was to use mass transit systems. Fichter argued that unless the systems operated more like a taxi service, arriving when called for and taking the passenger directly to their destination, people would not leave their cars to use it. Busses and metro systems are not personalized, they run on pre-planned routes and schedules, making stops along the way that do not serve each individual, only the group of riders as a whole.

Fichter and other planners tapped into a zeitgeist that was being fuelled by rapid urban decay in the U.S. President Kennedy addressed congress in 1962 and stated that "To conserve and enhance values in existing urban areas is essential. But at least as important are steps to promote economic efficiency and livability in areas of future development. Our national welfare therefore requires the provision of good urban transportation, with the properly balanced use of private vehicles and modern mass transport to help shape as well as serve urban growth." Funding provided through the U.S. Department of Housing and Urban Development (HUD) led to a series of reports by a variety of aerospace firms (notably Aerospace Corporation), today known as the "HUD reports", that explored various concepts and provided strong support for the basic concepts. A follow-on bill later in the decade provided additional funding for development of several experimental systems, and created the Urban Mass Transit Administration (UMTA).

=== Spectrum of designs ===
Other companies and government organizations soon joined these efforts, as it appeared PRT systems would soon be being deployed around the world. By the early 1970s there were at least a dozen development efforts in the U.S., a similar number in Europe and Japan, and two in Canada. The systems differed considerably in operating concept.

On the "simple end" of the scale were vehicles that used a guideway to steer, and left most other operations to a centralized control centre with some form of automatic train control. These systems had fairly slow reaction times that demanded fairly long headways between the trains. Most conventional metros have headways around two minutes or more, these new systems were generally on the order of 30 seconds. To make these systems efficient at high demand levels they had to have fairly large capacities, on the order of 25 to 100 passengers, which places them in the group rapid transit, or GRT, end of the people mover spectrum. These sorts of systems can be simplified if high performance is not required; GRT systems are quite common at airports today.

On the other end of the scale were the personal rapid transit systems, or PRTs. These systems abandoned centralized control for a simpler distributed solution based on set timings, speeds, or flocking behaviour. By placing the headway logic on the vehicles the reaction timing was dramatically improved, because they no longer had to communicate with a centralized system for traffic information or instructions. PRTs generally worked on headways of less than 10 seconds, which greatly increased the passenger density of the system as a whole. This allowed the vehicles to be much smaller and still retain the same system capacity as the larger GRTs, while offering the sort of personalized car-like operations that Individualized Automatic Transit envisioned.

=== Cabinentaxi ===
In 1969 Demag and MBB independently started projects studying PRT systems as a result of the HUD reports. At the time, the Bundesministerium für Forschung und Technologie (BMFT) was involved in a wide variety of transport research, including a variety of maglev trains for high-speed service, several automated railway systems, as well as more mundane research in railway safety and signalling. Significant within the transportation development programs of the BMFT was the direct involvement of the VOV (German Association of Public Transit Operators), the Deutsche Bundesbahn (German Federal Railway) and their safety experts. This assured that when development was completed, the systems would meet German (and by extension international) public transit standards.

When the BMFT learned of the separate efforts at Demag and MBB, they urged both companies to combine their efforts under a new joint operating company, which became Cabinentaxi. BMFT provided 80% of the total funding, considerably less than their counterparts in the U.S., which completely funded by the UMTA. By this time the system had been well-defined, and was committed to true PRT point-to-point service. In order to avoid stops along the way, stations were "off-line", on separate guideways placed beside the main routes, allowing en-route cars to pass them by. The cars themselves would handle switching along a pre-defined route, which allowed them to be directed to an optimal path in a network of any complexity. Studies suggested a three-passenger car for the basic system, although in order to increase capacity they also had cars with seating for 6, 12 and 18 passengers. These larger cars would normally be planned to operate in GRT fashion in order to increase the overall capacity of the network in the early development stages, where small networks in dense areas would not be meaningful in a small vehicle PRT mode. The larger cars could also be connected front-to-back to form two-car trains, further increasing capacity for some simple applications.

One problem with all elevated transportation system structures in general, is that the guideways (highways or transit) are widely considered to be an eyesore. In order to reduce the size of the guideways, Cabinentaxi took the uncommon approach of optionally allowing its cars to run on the top or bottom of a single track. The cars could not be switched from top to bottom, however. If this option was used, the guideways were supported on pillars that attached to the track from the side, rather than directly below. Cabinentaxi's guideway is noticeably smaller and thinner than conventional elevated systems, like the Vancouver SkyTrain. The track is approximately six feet wide, slightly smaller than a row of parking spots on the side of a city street.

=== Prototypes and testing ===
Testing of the motor and control systems started in 1972 on a 13-meter closed-loop track, running for 18 months. This was followed in August 1973 by a 150 meter test track and three 3-passenger vehicles installed near Hagen, Germany. The test track was expanded several times. By October 1974 it was 1136 meters long and featured two passenger stations with a closed-loop track, adding two additional vehicles for a total of five. By 1975 it had three stations and nine vehicles. The first 12-person vehicle was introduced that October. The final expansion was completed in 1976, bringing the total track to 1.9 km with six stations and twenty-four vehicles. In 1975, Raytheon Missile Systems examined the prototype system and decided to license it for deployment in the U.S., but a final agreement was never reached.

Cabinentaxi technology logged over 400,000 vehicle-miles between 1975 and 1978 on the Hagen test track. In 1977 the system completed fleet operation endurance testing of 7500 continuous vehicle hours, extending that in 1978 to 10,000 continuous vehicle hours. These are the only PRT fleet endurance test of these magnitudes ever carried out. Headways were reduced throughout the period, vehicle separations started at under 3 seconds, reaching 1.9 seconds in later tests, about the same as cars on a highway. The basic operating speed was also increased during testing, from the original 30 km/h to 36 in the later tests, with options for even higher speeds in production versions.

Late in the program a number of safety studies were carried out. Fire was a major concern of safety officials, but due to the simplicity of the vehicles, and a fire safety risk-reduction program it was demonstrated the possibility of fire was reduced to a non-issue. Other problems, like broken motors or a widespread power failure that demanded evacuation, were the primary areas of concern, but the solutions were found to lie in ground-based equipment and in specially equipped rescue cars that could operate on the guideway and access both levels. The final system plans required no external walkways.

=== Cabinlift ===
While work on the basic Cabinentaxi continued, a modified version known as Cabinlift was also developed. Originally designed for installations in healthcare facilities, Cabinlift was based on substantially similar technology as the basic Cabinentaxi. The Cabinlift cars were larger and taller, allowing easy walk-on access for passengers and bulky loads, notably wheeled hospital beds and gurneys. The cars could be built with the doors on the side, or on the ends. Unlike Cabinentaxi, passengers in Cabinlift could stand with some fold-down seats available.

One Cabinlift system with two stations was installed at the Schwalmstadt-Ziegenhain hospital in 1975 and operative until 2002. A larger and more complex network was planned for the central hospital in Bremen, but funding fell through.

=== Deployment projects ===
When the safety studies were completed the various levels of government signed off on the system and released it for commercial development. Several developments were already being studied by that point.

One was an expansion of the original Hagen system, done as much as an example of the planning process as a serious proposal. This deployment envisioned a staged development starting with the 12-passenger cars in a network of about 40 stations covering the downtown core. Additional lines would then be added until it was fully expanded with 138 km of track and 182 stations covering the majority of the city and several surrounding suburbs and towns. The outlying tracks would primarily use the smaller cars. Funding for this deployment was not forthcoming.

A system was proposed for Hamburg, initially consisting of approximately 7.5 miles of over and under guideway with 11 stations and 50 vehicles. In 1977 Hamburger Hochbahn estimated the total costs for this initial installation to be $56,568,000, or $7.5 million per double lane mile (compare with a Canadian estimate from 1980 at $75 to $80 million per mile for underground subway lines). These were not the final system costs which would have only been determined after construction, and cost increases were already being experienced as the project neared the start of construction.

Cabinentaxi, as Cabintaxi, was also one of the systems approved to contend for the UMTA's Downtown People Mover Program. It was recognized as the favorite system to win the Detroit People Mover project. For the Detroit project, the system's over-and-under beam was a major advantage as the city specified a single-beam system, and the over-and-under beam would provide bi-directional operation which the city wanted but could not otherwise get with its single beam restriction. The schedules for the Detroit People Mover Program and the Hamburg application appeared to conflict, so the consortium chose to withdraw from the US competition and concentrate on Hamburg.

J. Edward Anderson, the well-known U.S. proponent of PRT systems, also selected Cabinentaxi for a proposed deployment in Indianapolis. After the initial $300,000 for the study ran out, no further money was forthcoming and the plans fell through.

The developing firms found themselves without a market opportunity in Europe or the United States, and withdrew from the public transit field. Interest in the system in the U.S. lived on, and in 1985 a consortium was arranged to take over the design rights under Cabintaxi Corporation. No installations followed, however.

== Design ==
=== Vehicles ===
The final primary vehicle designs for the Cabinentaxi system were the "KK 3"(Klein Kabine 3), a three-passenger vehicle, and the "KK 12" (Klein Kabine 12), a twelve-passenger vehicle, both with a semi-automatic doors. They were designed with enough room between the seats for wheelchairs, prams or bicycles. The doors were semi-automatic, locking and unlocking under vehicle control, but slid open by the passengers. The vehicle bodies were made of aluminum over a steel chassis, riding on solid rubber wheels that engaged the guidance rails in the track.

Cabinentaxi offered very high capacity utilization of its lines, up to 80% full before congestion would occur. Cabinentaxi also had a number of different car sizes, seating 6, 12 and 18 passengers. The larger cars could be formed into two-unit trains which could increase system capacity in small loop or shuttle operations, but the two-unit train had limited advantage in large network applications where short headways are effectively an electronic coupling. The "KK" series of vehicles, "KK 3", "KK 6", "KK 12", and "KK 18" (all designed, but only the KK 3 and KK 12 were developed), were all of the same cross-sectional area with only the length of the vehicle changed. With the same construction style in the body and undercarriages, these vehicle could share the same small vehicle guideway.

=== Motor and power supply ===
In order to provide fine control over vehicle spacing and reduce maintenance costs, the companies selected a linear motor (LIM) for the Cabinentaxi project. Linear motors were a major area of research since the 1960s when they were first introduced in the U.K. by Eric Laithwaite. As they have no moving parts, a LIM-powered vehicle would be more reliable than one using a conventional motor. Another advantage is that there is no contact between the motor and the track, so snow or rain will not affect its performance, which means a LIM vehicle does not require additional headspace in bad weather. Also, because the traction does not rely on friction, LIMs can climb much steeper grades. On the downside, LIMs require a "reaction rail" for the motor to push against, which increases capital costs slightly.

=== Guideway ===
Cabinentaxi was designed to allow top or bottom running of the vehicles, or both on one track.

=== Guidance and control ===
Cabinentaxi's control system was decentralized, with three different control systems, each in command of one portion of the system's overall operation.

The vehicle itself was responsible for maintaining separation from the vehicle in front of it, and automatically switching from guideway to guideway. Since the measurement and control of separation did not require communications with external systems, reaction times were greatly reduced and headways were much shorter than systems using a central computer to control spacing.

There was a centralized control system used in Cabinentaxi, but it did not have direct control over the vehicles. This system was used to plan the most efficient route when a customer selected a destination and paid for it. The calculated route was then uploaded onto a magnetic stripe on the customer's fare card. The card was then inserted into a reader to call a car from the storage area or one passing by on the line, at which point the reader uploaded the route to the car's onboard computer. Once calculated the route was static, although the customer did have the option to stop at the very next station if they pressed a button in the car.

A third system handled operations within the stations, which were "offline" from the main guideways. Stations had multiple berths for loading and unloading, as well as longer areas for acceleration and deceleration to collect vehicles as they switched on or off the main guideways. When a vehicle entered the station's off-ramp, it automatically slowed to a stop where the passengers would exit the car. The station computer would then direct it to a position in a storage ring to wait for the next customer.

When it was called for the station would switch it back onto the main platform where the passengers would use their fare card to enter the vehicle. When a vehicle was loaded, the station computer watched the traffic on the adjacent mainline and looked for gaps in the vehicles passing by the station. When a suitable gap was seen, the station would calculate the time needed for the car to accelerate up to mainline speed, and then give it the go command at the right time so it would reach the switch onto the mainline right as the gap was reaching it.

=== Loading and system capacity ===
Key to the efficient operation of any PRT system is the queuing of free vehicles throughout the stations on the system. Increasing the number of idle vehicles reduces the passenger wait times, as well as reducing the need to move empty vehicles through the system in order to pick up passengers. However, this also requires additional vehicles, thereby increasing capital costs. Communications between the centralized computer and the station computers allowed cars to be switched from station to station in order to keep the stations supplied with free vehicles.
