= Personal public transport =

Network of private self-drive rentals

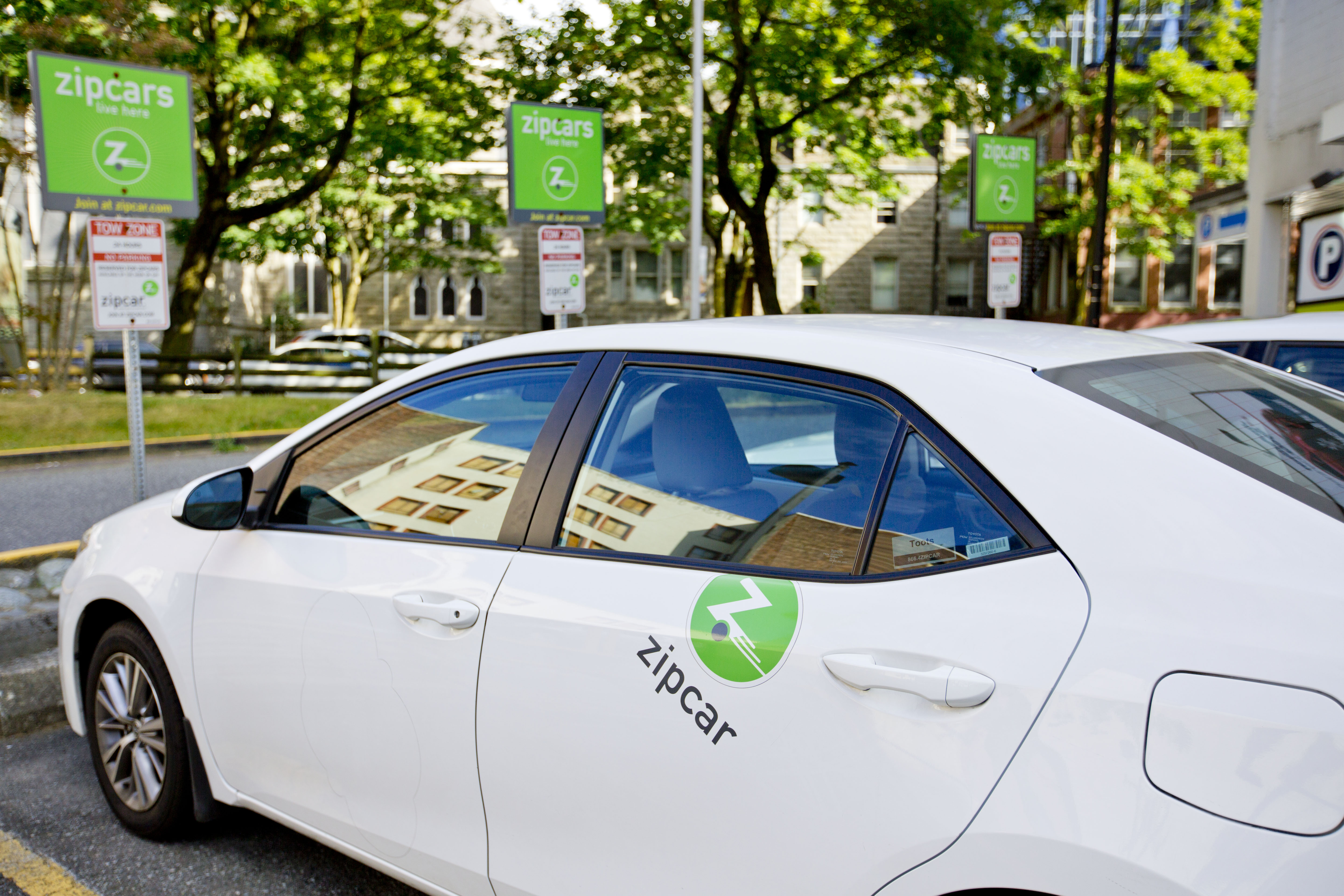
Zipcar rental vehicle parking bay in Vancouver

Personal public transport (PPT) is a network of private rental vehicles for users to drive, distributed at fixed locations throughout an area and available to the general public in such a way that each user has the ability to determine the route and schedule on a self-service basis (without advance prebooking). The design of a PPT system encourages utility (usually trips) over revenue.

== Overview ==
While most public transport systems operate on specific routes with set timetables, PPT systems utilize a network of vehicles at various locations for users when they desire them, allowing those users to take any route that serves their needs and to return the vehicle to any designated point within the coverage area. The user operates or directs, in an auto-drive vehicle, the vehicle to the destination versus this being done by a driver or conductor in traditional public transport options. Similar to traditional public transport options, the system is managed by a transit authority or private transport operator but the pricing model encourages users to return the vehicle quickly. Maximizing vehicle utility over revenue means operators seek revenue from other sources such as advertising, subsidy and system sponsorship.

== Terminology ==
Personal public transport was conceptualized to explain the unique difference in service provided over traditional public transport options such as bus, rail, taxi and rapid transit as well as paratransit and personal rapid transport.

== Coverage area ==
Instead of utilizing routes, in the way that traditional public transport does, a PPT system operates within a defined area, termed the coverage area. Vehicles can be found or left anywhere the law allows within that area or at specific locations within the coverage area. Examples of specific locations can be public or private demarcated areas shared with other vehicles or specific station locations.

== Vehicles and services ==
The vehicle is designed to cater to an individual user or a small party's transport needs (not shared with strangers for the rental duration like public transport). The vehicles are intended for a single trip on public thoroughfares either shared by other modes or segregated. The user is responsible for adhering to all laws and regulations while using the vehicle and enforcement is done through existing public law enforcement mechanisms such as licensing and ticketing.

== Access to PPT ==
While a PPT is a general public transport service not requiring advance prebooking, it generally requires users to be registered with the system or to pay a deposit to ensure the return of the vehicle in good working condition. The tipping point of successful PPT systems has been the application of information technology systems (ITS) enabling user identification and vehicle tracking in a system. This is usually aided by Radio Frequency Identification Devices (RFID) and real-time information flow using wireless internet. GPS tracking devices are also common in vehicles to guard against theft.

== Financing and pricing ==
PPT is financed through a variety of mechanisms similar to other public transportation projects. Capital costs are usually covered through government subsidy (exceptions do exist) and there are multiple revenue streams which strive to cover operating costs. Revenue streams vary greatly depending on the system and attributes and laws of the area it is implemented. Many times government subsidies are needed to meet the operating costs. The pricing model of PPT encourages short trips and multiple uses over revenue. This pricing model prioritizes utility at the expense of revenue and is a key differentiating factor between PPT and private vehicle hire and some other modes of public transport.

== Examples ==
Many bicycle sharing programs globally are examples of PPT. Large citywide bicycle sharing programs such as Vélib', Capital Bikeshare, and BIXI Montréal all have attributes of PPT. Bicycle rental enterprises are not PPTs because the bicycles have to be used and returned to a single location and the pricing model encourages users to keep the bicycles out for greater lengths of time.

Some car sharing systems are also examples of PPT.
