= Northern Illinois Transit Authority =

Transit agency serving Chicagoland and surroundings

Overview
- Locale: Chicago metropolitan area
- Transit type: Commuter rail, bus, rapid transit, paratransit, demand-response, vanpool
- Number of lines: 356 (bus and train routes)
- Number of stations: 24,500 (bus stops and train stations)
- Daily ridership: 1.3 million
- Annual ridership: 373.5 million (2025)
- Chief executive: Jamie Rhee
- Headquarters: Chicago, Illinois
- Website: nita.illinois.gov

Operation
- Began operation: March 19, 1974; 52 years ago (RTA); September 1, 2026; 2 months ago (NITA)
- Operators: Chicago Transit Authority; Metra Commuter Rail; Pace Suburban Bus
- Number of vehicles: 5,234 bus and rail cars plus 663 vanpool vehicles

Technical
- System length: 7,200 mi (11,587.28 km)

The Northern Illinois Transit Authority (NITA) is the financial and oversight body for three transit agencies in northeastern Illinois; the Chicago Transit Authority (CTA), Metra, and the Pace Suburban Bus. NITA serves Cook, DuPage, Kane, Lake, McHenry and Will counties.

The NITA system provides 1.3 million rides per day over 7,200 miles of bus and train routes, making it the second-largest public transit network in the United States.

Beginning June 1, 2026, the Regional Transportation Authority (RTA) transitioned into what is now the Northern Illinois Transit Authority, in accordance with state legislation passed in late 2025. The NITA naming was fully adopted on September 1, 2026.

== Overview ==
The Northern Illinois Transit Authority (NITA) serves as the coordinating agency of the Chicago area's three transit service providers: CTA, Metra, and Pace. It has the authority to set fares, create and enforce service standards, and set schedules across the three systems within the six-county region it operates within. NITA will also be responsible for strategic planning for the entire regional transit system.

Each of NITA's three operating service boards provide different service types:

- Chicago Transit Authority (CTA): Provides 137 fixed-route bus services and eight rapid transit services (known as the Chicago "L") within the City of Chicago and 35 surrounding suburbs. In downtown Chicago, several "L" rapid transit services use the Loop elevated structure, while several bus routes use the Loop Link busway.
- Metra (NITA's Commuter Rail Division): Provides eleven commuter rail services from four rail terminals in downtown Chicago to 243 stations across the entire NITA region. One route extends into Kenosha, Wisconsin (which is not part of the NITA region).
- Pace (NITA's Suburban Bus Division): Provides 134 fixed-route bus services (including expressway-based routes on I-55, I-90, and I-94, and the Pulse express services) throughout the suburban areas of the NITA region, with a few routes entering the City of Chicago. It also operates paratransit, demand-response, and vanpool services for the entire NITA region.

Ventra serves as the official fare-collection system for CTA and Pace. The Ventra mobile app also sells Metra tickets and passes.

== Governance ==
The Board Chair Tom Kotarac, and Interim Executive Director Jamie Rhee, were both unanimously elected by the board at its first meeting on September 10, 2026.

The NITA Board consists of 20 members, including:

- 5 members appointed by the Governor of Illinois;
- 5 members appointed by the Mayor of Chicago;
- 5 members appointed by the Cook County Board President;
- 1 member by the DuPage County Board Chair;
- 1 member by the Kane County Board Chair;
- 1 member by the Lake County Board Chair;
- 1 member by the McHenry County Board Chair;
- 1 member by the Will County Board Chair.

Some members hold dual appointments on the boards of CTA, Metra, or Pace.

== History ==
=== Establishment of the Regional Transportation Authority in 1974 ===
F40PH locomotive in the RTA scheme before the establishment of Metra

RTA was created after a referendum in 1974. In 1973, CTA had instituted its first major service cuts, and several suburban bus companies, including Evanston Bus Company and Glenview Bus Company had ceased operations, forcing Evanston to make arrangements with CTA and Wilmette to start a municipal service. The Rock Island and Milwaukee Road were already facing financial distresses, which would lead to their eventual bankruptcies, and the Illinois Central was petitioning the Interstate Commerce Commission to increase commuter fares, on the basis that the cost of operating its commuter train system was a burden on interstate commerce. While several suburbs had organized Mass Transit Districts to purchase equipment for the carriers with federal financial assistance, the Rock Island was still operating old equipment that it could not afford to replace. In an attempt to deal with these problems in the six-county area, the RTA was established, with some taxing powers, to provide financial support through grants to the CTA and suburban mass transit districts, and purchase of service agreements with the private bus and rail operators.

=== Reorganization of the RTA in 1983 ===
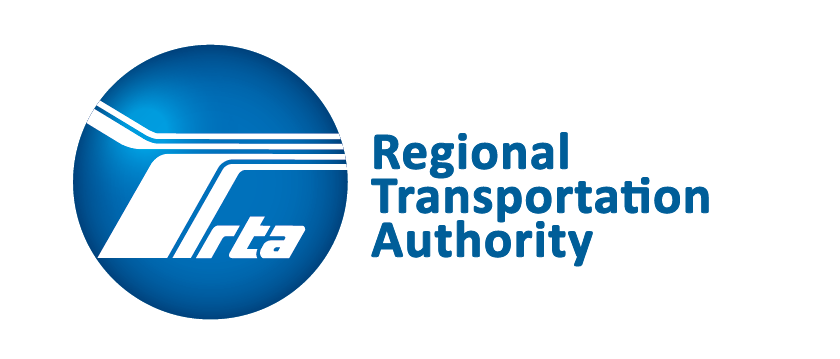
Logo used by the RTA until 2022

In 1983, after a financial crisis, and the RTA taking over several private bus companies and the Rock Island and Milwaukee Road lines, the RTA Act was amended to create the Suburban Bus Division, now known as Pace, and the Commuter Rail Division, now known as Metra. RTA's role then changed, so that it is now responsible for reviewing the operating and capital plans and expenditures of the Service Boards, developing an annual budget and program as well as a five-year plan, and distributing sales tax receipts to the Service Boards, in accordance with a statutory formula. However, RTA no longer provides service directly, as the Service Boards have the authority to determine the level, nature, and kind of public transportation to be provided, and to establish fares. Originally, RTA entered into purchase of service agreements with carriers, but the 1983 amendment gives the Service Boards the power to enter into those agreements with transportation agencies.

The 1983 legislation also imposed the requirements that the level of fares must be sufficient, in the aggregate, to equal 50 percent of the cost of providing transportation, and that the RTA Board inform each Service Board, as part of the budget process, of its required recovery ratio for the next fiscal year.

=== 2004–2007 funding debate and 2008 legislation ===
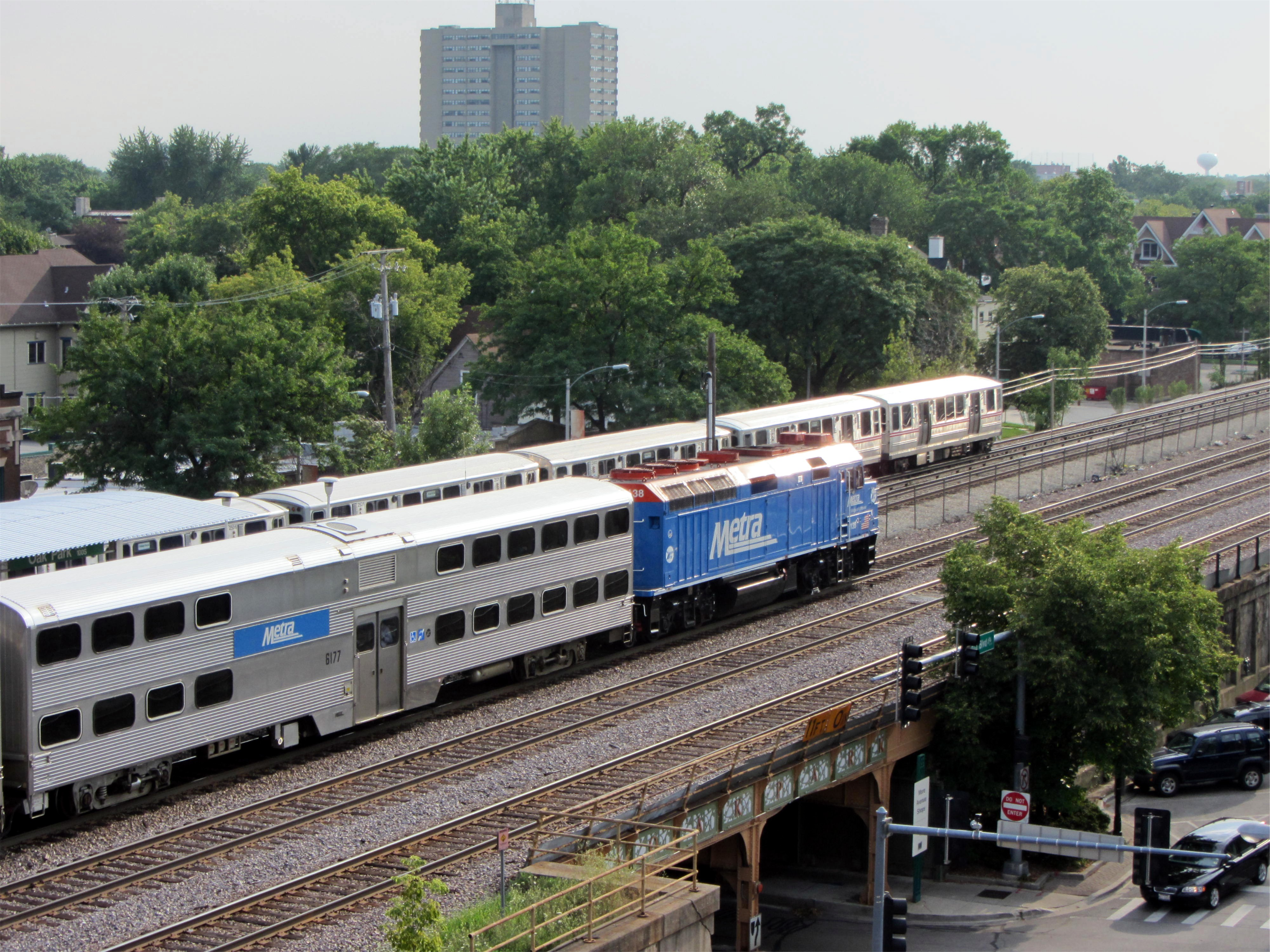
Metra and CTA trains

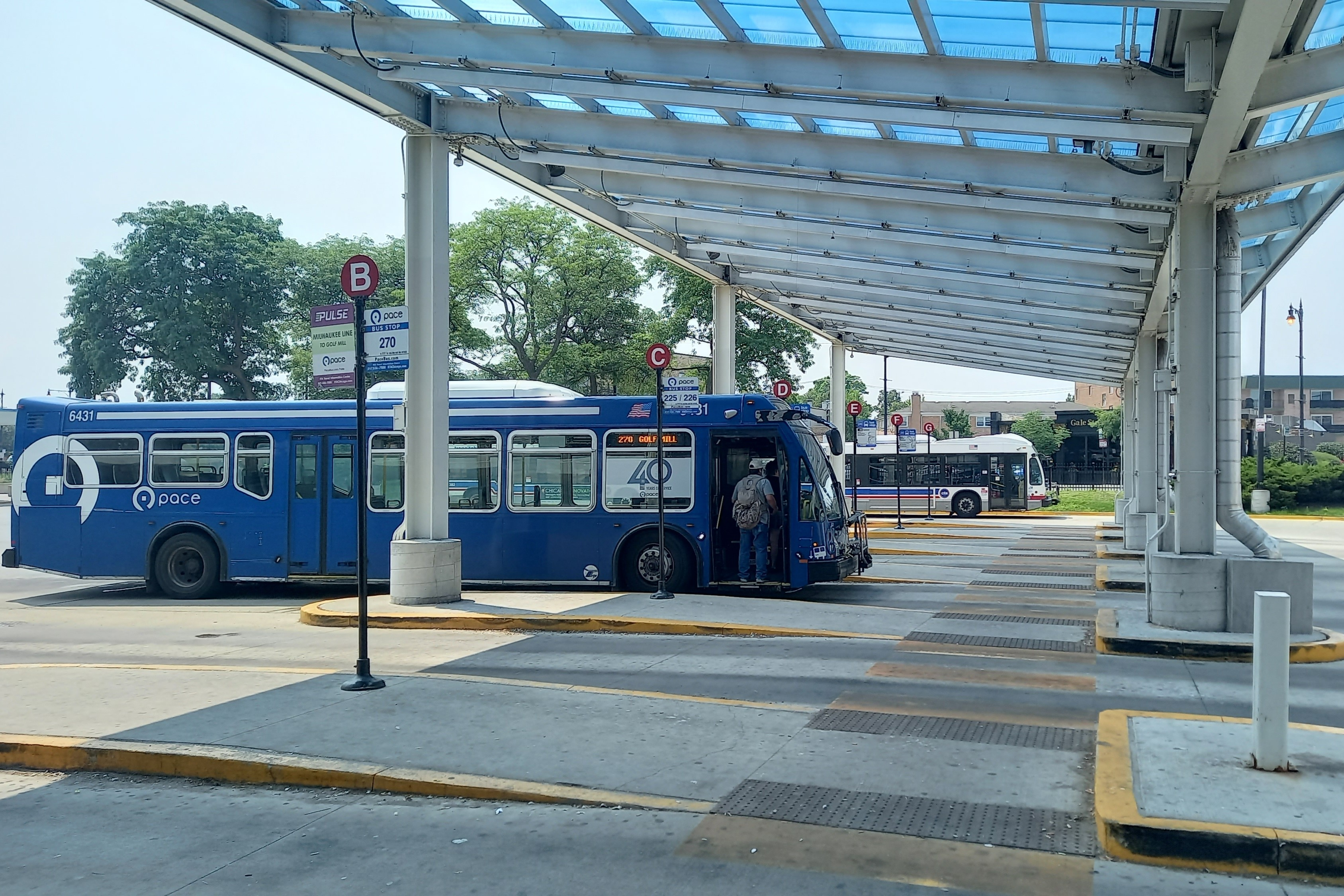
Pace and CTA buses

==== Background ====
In 2004, the CTA, projecting a $55 million funding shortfall in its 2005 budget, called for a "long term funding solution," involving a change to the sales tax distribution formula in the RTA Act. In response, the Illinois General Assembly appropriated $54 million to cover the cost of CTA's paratransit service for 2005. An amendment to the RTA Act made the RTA responsible for the funding, financial review and oversight of all ADA paratransit services, effective July 1, 2005, and transferred responsibility for operating or providing for the operation of paratransit service to Pace starting July 1, 2006, thereby relieving the CTA of that responsibility. The General Assembly also directed the Illinois Auditor General to audit the RTA and the Service Boards, as part of its review of the funding issue. The Auditor General's preliminary report, while agreeing that public funding was insufficient to support the level of transit services, said that the legislature must address other issues, including underfunded pensions, high salaries, absenteeism, and the lack of strong, centralized planning, resulting in several of the service boards competing for customers in the same areas, the Auditor General calling for "an end to the transit agencies fighting each other for customers, routes and federal funding for pet projects that may not fit into an overall regional transit plan."

The RTA approved 2007 Service Board budgets premised on the assumption that "a new funding source would be identified in 2007 to meet the funding requirements of [the] budget." Nonetheless, the CTA budget recognized, "Without this new funding source, CTA will be forced to cut service." With no legislative action by August, 2007, CTA and Pace announced proposals for service cuts, popularly known as "Doomsday Plans," to be implemented September 16. The September plans were postponed when the Governor proposed advancing 2008 state subsidies. A new Doomsday date was set for November 4, but that was avoided when the Governor engineered a transfer of capital funds. Again, the legislature having failed to pass a transit bill, the three service boards proposed 2008 budgets that assumed no new funding and postulated service cuts by CTA and Pace, and the deferral of capital projects by Metra, as well as fare increases by all three agencies.

The barriers to 2007 passage of a bill were the requirement that a 3/5ths supermajority of the legislators was needed to pass a bill after May 31 to be immediately effective, the Governor had threatened to veto a bill that included a sales tax increase, and many legislators tied a transit bill to a capital plan and a casino bill to fund that capital plan. However, with a new Doomsday deadline of January 20, 2008 approaching, the Governor called on the legislature to pass some bill, and he would "improve it," presumably using the amendatory veto. The Legislature passed HB656 on January 10, to which the Governor affixed an amendatory veto allowing senior citizens to ride all transit systems in the state for free. Although various media reports expressed concern that the legislation could not receive the votes to sustain it after it was returned with the amendment, the amendatory veto was accepted and the legislation passed on January 17, 2008.

==== Legislative response ====
The highlights of the 2008 amendments to the RTA Act include:

- The RTA sales tax was increased to 1.25% in Cook County, and 0.75% in the collar counties (from 1% and 0.25%, respectively), but one-third of the sales tax collected in the collar counties (i.e. 0.25%) is distributed directly to the counties and the county boards may use that money for transportation or public safety purposes.
- A new distribution of revenues is prescribed, essentially leaving the distribution of the sales taxes collected at the old rates as is (by references to "85% of 80% of the receipts from those taxes collected within the City of Chicago" and the like) and then, after certain funds described below are set aside, the remainder is allocated 48% to CTA, 39% to Metra and 13% to Pace.
- The Act requires that the RTA establish an Innovation, Coordination, and Enhancement Fund, an ADA Paratransit Fund, and a Suburban Community Mobility Fund.
- The Act calls for the implementation of an Interstate 55 bus rapid transit project and allocates money for programs to enhance access to job markets for residents in south suburban Cook County.
- Upon the vote of 9 Directors of the RTA, the Executive Director may intervene in a dispute among service boards or transportation agencies.
- On the vote of 12 Directors, the RTA may take over an alternatives analysis and preliminary environmental assessment of a project where multiple Service Boards or transportation agencies are potential service providers.
- The RTA must establish Disadvantaged Business Enterprise Contracting and Equal Employment Opportunity Programs.
- The RTA and Metra boards were reapportioned, effective April 1, 2008, with the most significant changes being that the chair of the CTA may no longer be on the RTA board, and the President of the Cook County Board was given an appointment to the RTA and Metra boards, respectively.

In addition, the legislation amended various other laws to deal with underfunding of the CTA Retirement Plan, and authorized the Chicago City Council to raise the real estate transfer tax for the sole benefit of the CTA, which it did.

=== Pre-NITA efforts to reform the RTA ===
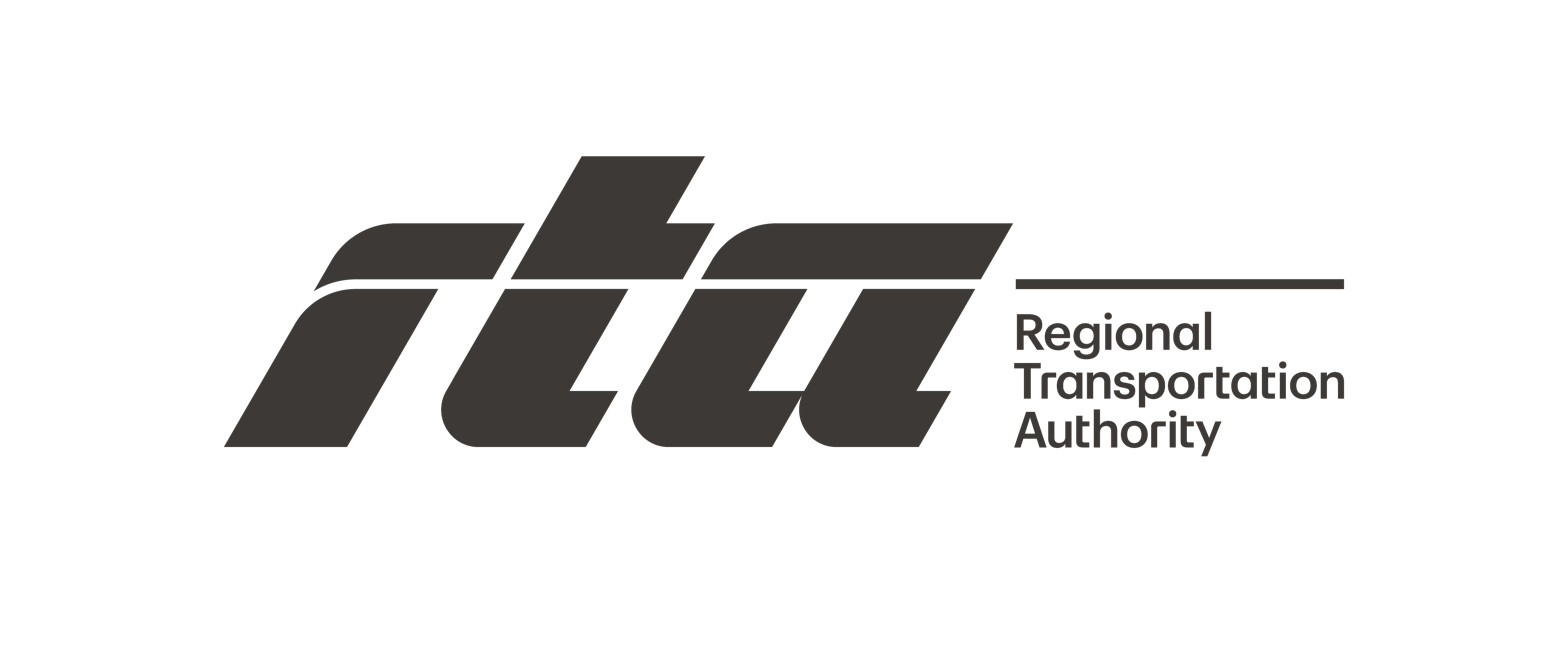
Logo used by the RTA from 2022 until its replacement by NITA in 2026

Since the 2008 changes, there have been several proposals to reform the region's transit agencies more dramatically. In the wake of Metra's 2013 patronage scandal, state senators Daniel Biss and Terry Link introduced a bill to merge the RTA with the Chicago Metropolitan Agency for Planning (CMAP).

At the same time, Governor Pat Quinn convened the Northeastern Illinois Public Transit Task Force to study potential reforms—this group concluded that Metra, the CTA, and Pace should be consolidated into one agency. Chicago mayor Rahm Emanuel opposed consolidation as reducing accountability to voters. In 2014, a report from the Organisation for Economic Co-operation and Development also recommended combining Metra, the CTA, and Pace to improve coordination.

=== Replacement by the Northern Illinois Transit Authority in 2026 ===
==== Addressing the post-COVID "Fiscal Cliff" ====
In an effort to avert a "fiscal cliff" attributed to the COVID-19 pandemic, in September 2023, CMAP raised the possibility of raising taxes as well as merging CTA, Metra, and Pace into one larger agency. On April 29, 2024, state Senator Ram Villivalam introduced the Metropolitan Mobility Authority Act, which called for replacing the RTA and three constituent transit agencies with a larger agency named the Metropolitan Mobility Authority (MMA). The merger was touted for its potential to streamline transit services throughout the metropolitan area and address the budget shortfall. However, suburban leaders and labor unions raised concerns about their representations being reduced under the MMA. Additionally, transit leaders of the CTA, Metra, and Pace argued that the fiscal cliff should be addressed by providing more funding, rather than consolidating agencies.

==== Passage of the Northern Illinois Transit Authority Act ====
On May 28, 2025, the state legislators proposed restructuring the RTA as the Northern Illinois Transit Authority (NITA). Unlike the previously proposed MMA, NITA would only attain greater oversight on services and projects as well as unify fares among subordinate transit agencies.

The associated legislation, the Northern Illinois Transit Authority Act, was passed by the legislature on October 31, 2025 as a part of the Illinois People Over Parking Act, and signed by Governor JB Pritzker on December 16, 2025.

==== Transition to NITA ====
The NITA Act took effect on June 1, 2026 and the Regional Transportation Authority officially began the transition process. The transition from RTA to NITA won't be immediate, but rather a phase-by-phase process. The Illinois Department of Transportation (IDOT) will hire an outside consultant to assist with the transition process.

- June 1, 2026: The NITA Act took effect and the RTA began the transition process. The RTA Board approved a 0.25% sales tax increase.
- Summer 2026: Respective elected officials make their appointments to the NITA Board.
- September 1, 2026: The NITA Board is officially seated and the NITA naming is fully adopted.
- Fall 2026: The NITA Board developed and proposed a new regional budget for 2027.
- December 1, 2026: Law Enforcement Task Force delivers crime prevention recommendations to the NITA Board.
- July 1, 2027: IDOT's consultant will deliver a Transition Plan to the Illinois General Assembly.
- December 15, 2027: The NITA Board issues requests for service plan proposals for CTA, Metra, and Pace.
- August 2028: The NITA Board adopts a service plan for the entire region.
- 2030: NITA must unify the fare systems of CTA, Metra, and Pace.
- 2033: NITA will fully implement a service standards model for operations funding.

== See also ==
- Unbuilt Rosemont personal rapid transit system
