= Advanced Transit Association =

U.S. non-profit organization

The Advanced Transit Association (ATRA) is a non-profit organisation whose purpose is to encourage the development and deployment of Automated Transit Networks, including personal rapid transit systems. ATRA was formed in 1976 and in 1988 published a report that became an essential factor in increasing the credibility of the personal rapid transit concept.

== Publications ==
"Advanced Transit and Urban Revitalization, an International Dialogue" was published by the ATRA at an international conference in Indianapolis in 1978.

== Industry Group Members ==
Ultra Global, 2getthere, Arup, LogistikCentrum, the consulting firm of Dr. Ingmar Andreasson, PRT Consulting, Podaris, DICAM, Lea+Elliott and BergerABAM.

== Academic Council Members ==
University of Maryland, Princeton University, University of Bologna, Mineta Transportation Institute, Southern Illinois University
