= Personal rapid transit =

Public transport mode

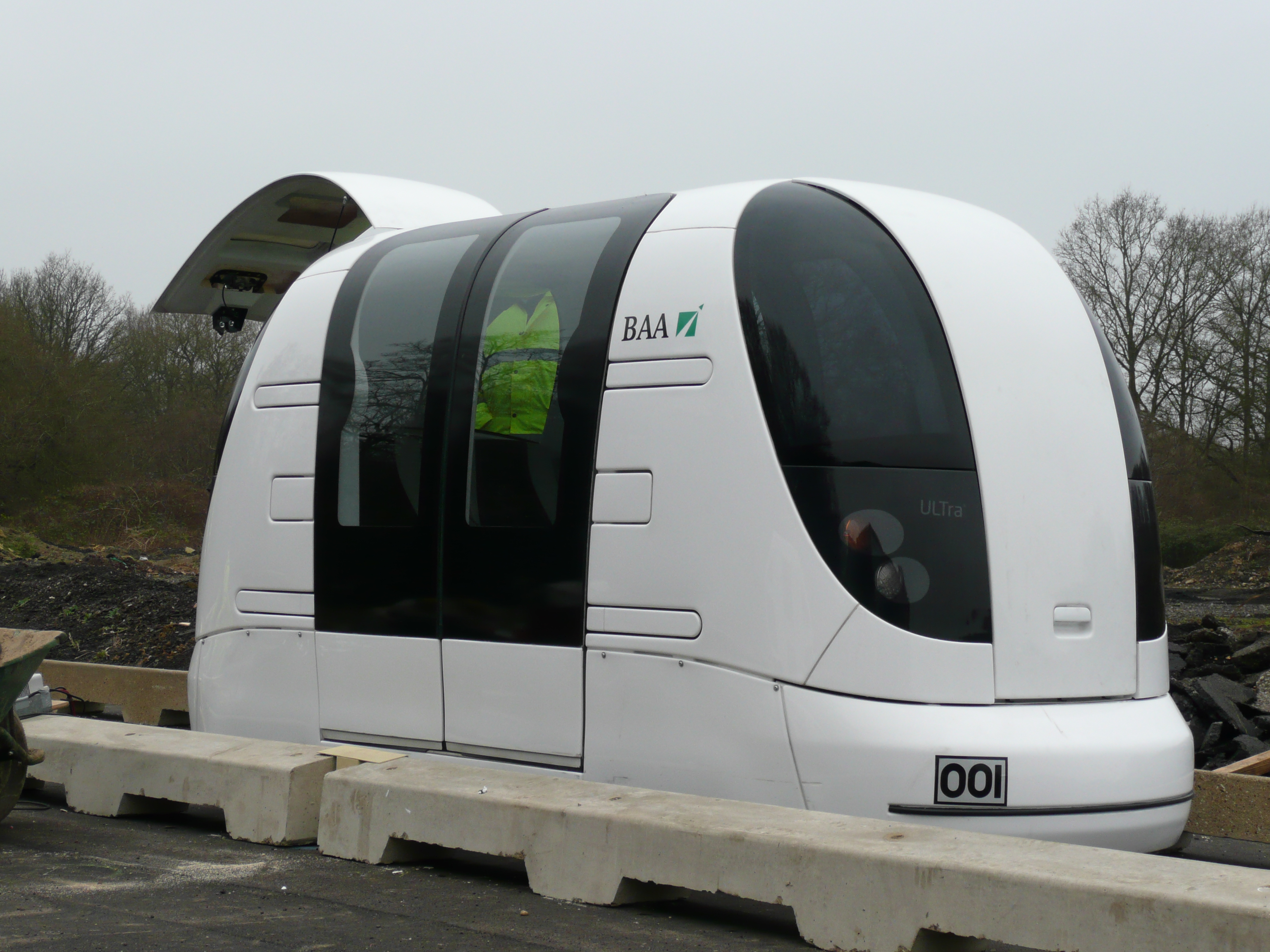
An Ultra PRT vehicle on a test track at Heathrow Airport, London

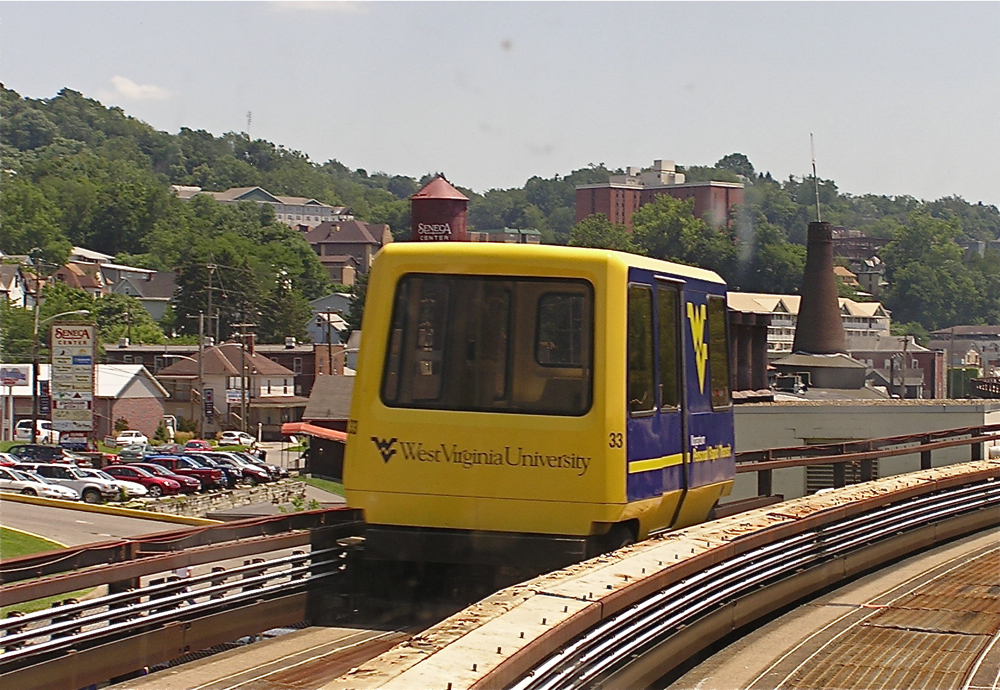
A vehicle on West Virginia University's PRT system, Morgantown, West Virginia

Personal rapid transit (PRT), also referred to as podcars or guided/railed taxis, is a public transport mode featuring a network of specially built guideways on which ride small automated vehicles that carry few (generally less than 6) passengers per vehicle. PRT is a type of automated guideway transit (AGT), a class of system which also includes larger vehicles all the way to small subway systems. In terms of routing, it tends towards personal public transport systems.

PRT vehicles are sized for individual or small group travel, typically carrying no more than three to six passengers per vehicle. Guideways are arranged in a network topology, with all stations located on sidings, and with frequent merge/diverge points. This allows for nonstop, point-to-point travel, bypassing all intermediate stations. The point-to-point service has been compared to a taxi or a horizontal lift (elevator).

Numerous PRT systems have been proposed but most have not been implemented. As of November 2016, only a handful of PRT systems are operational: Morgantown Personal Rapid Transit (the oldest and most extensive), in Morgantown, West Virginia, has been in continuous operation since 1975. Since 2010 a 10-vehicle 2getthere system has operated at Masdar City, UAE, and since 2011 a 21-vehicle Ultra PRT system has run at London Heathrow Airport. A 40-vehicle Vectus system with in-line stations officially opened in Suncheon, South Korea, in April 2014. A PRT system connecting the terminals and parking has been built at Chengdu Tianfu International Airport, but as of 2026 remain non-operational, five years after the airport opened.

== Overview ==
Most mass transit systems move people in groups over scheduled routes. This has inherent inefficiencies. For passengers, time is wasted by waiting for the next vehicle to arrive, indirect routes to their destination, stopping for passengers with other destinations, and often confusing or inconsistent schedules. Slowing and accelerating large weights can undermine public transport's benefit to the environment while slowing other traffic.

Personal rapid transit systems attempt to eliminate these wastes by moving small groups nonstop in automated vehicles on fixed tracks. Passengers can ideally board a pod immediately upon arriving at a station, and can – with a sufficiently extensive network of tracks – take relatively direct routes to their destination without stops.

The low weight of PRT's small vehicles allows smaller guideways and support structures than mass transit systems like light rail. The smaller structures translate into lower construction costs, smaller easements, and less visually obtrusive infrastructure.

As it stands, a citywide deployment with many lines and closely spaced stations, as envisioned by proponents, has yet to be constructed. Past projects have failed because of financing, cost overruns, regulatory conflicts, political issues, misapplied technology, and flaws in design, engineering or review.

However, the theory remains active. For example, from 2002 to 2005, the EDICT project, sponsored by the European Union, conducted a study on the feasibility of PRT in four European cities. The study involved 12 research organizations, and concluded that PRT:

- would provide future cities "a highly accessible, user-responsive, environmentally friendly transport system which offers a sustainable and economic solution."
- could "cover its operating costs, and provide a return which could pay for most, if not all, of its capital costs."
- would provide "a level of service which is superior to that available from conventional public transport."
- would be "well received by the public, both public transport and car users."

The report also concluded that, despite these advantages, public authorities will not commit to building PRT because of the risks associated with being the first public implementation.

Comparison of personal rapid transit with existing transport systems
Similar to cars / automobiles	Vehicles are small—typically two to six passengers; Vehicles are individually hired, like taxis, and shared only with the passengers of one's choosing; Vehicles travel along a network of guideways, much like a network of streets. Travel is point-to-point, with no intermediate stops or transfers; Potential for on-demand, around-the-clock availability; Stops are designed to be off the main guideway, allowing through traffic to bypass stations unimpeded
Similar to trams, buses, and monorails	A public amenity (although not necessarily publicly owned), shared by multiple users; Reduced local pollution (electric powered); Passengers embark and disembark at discrete stations, analogous to bus stops or taxi stands
Similar to automated people movers	Fully automated, including vehicle control, routing, and collection of fares; Usually above the street—typically elevated—reducing land usage and congestion
Distinct features	Vehicle movements may be coordinated, unlike the autonomous human control of cars and bikes; Small vehicle size allows infrastructure to be smaller than other transit modes; Automated vehicles can travel close together. Possibilities include dynamically combined "trains" of vehicles, separated by a few inches, to reduce drag and increase speed, energy efficiency and passenger density

The PRT acronym was introduced formally in 1978 by J. Edward Anderson. The Advanced Transit Association (ATRA), a group which advocates the use of technological solutions to transit problems, compiled a definition in 1988 that can be seen here.

== List of operational automated transit networks (ATN) systems ==
Currently, five advanced transit networks (ATN) systems are operational, and several more are in the planning stage.

System	Manufacturer	Type	Locations	Length	Stations / vehicles	Notes
Morgantown PRT	Boeing	GRT	(United States) Morgantown, West Virginia, US (1975)	13.2 km (8.2 mi)	5 / 73	Up to 20 passengers per vehicle, some rides not point-to-point during low usage periods
ParkShuttle	2getthere	GRT	Rivium, the Netherlands (November 2005)	1.8 km (1.1 mi)	5	2nd generation GRT (Group Rapid Transit) vehicles accommodate up to 24 passengers (12 seated). The vehicles operate on-schedule during peak hours, at a 2.5 minute interval, and can operate on demand during off-peak hours. The current system will operate until the end of 2018, after which it is expected to be replaced and expanded.
CyberCab	2getthere	PRT	(United Arab Emirates) Masdar City, Abu Dhabi, UAE (November 2010)	1.5 km (0.9 mi)	2/10 passenger, (3/3 freight, not put into service)	Initial plans called for cars to be banned, with PRT as the only powered intra-city transport (along with an inter-city light rail line). In October 2010 it was announced the PRT would not expand beyond the pilot scheme due to the cost of creating the undercroft to segregate the system from pedestrian traffic. Plans now include electric cars and electric buses. In June 2013 a representative of the builder 2getthere said the freight vehicles had still not been put into service because they had not worked out how to get freight to and from the stations.
Ultra PRT	Heathrow pod	PRT	(United Kingdom) Heathrow Airport, England, UK (June 2011)	3.8 km (2.4 mi)	3 / 21	The Heathrow PRT system became operational in 2011, connecting Terminal 5 with a long-term car park. In May 2014 BAA said in a draft 5-year plan that it would extend the system throughout the airport, but this was dropped from the final plan.
Skycube	Vectus	PRT	Suncheon, South Korea (September 2013)	4.64 km (2.9 mi)	2 / 40	Connects the site of 2013 Suncheon Garden Expo Korea to a station in the wetlands "Buffer Area" next to the Suncheon Literature Museum; the line runs parallel to the Suncheon-dong Stream. Stations are "on-line."

In addition, one PRT has completed construction but has not been commissioned.

System	Manufacturer	Type	Locations	Length	Stations / vehicles	Notes
Ultra PRT	Kunming Shipbuilding Equipment	PRT	Tianfu Airport, Chengdu, China	5 km (3.1 miles)	3 / 22	Connects the airport terminal to the parking lots. While the airport opened in 2021, as of February 2025, the PRT has not been opened to the public.

== List of ATN suppliers ==
The following list summarizes several well-known automated transit networks (ATN) suppliers as of 2014, with subsequent amendments.

- Revenue service: Boeing (Morgantown PRT), Heathrow pod, 2getthere, Vectus.
- Full test track: Modutram, Cabinentaxi, Glydways, Urbanloop
- Historical: CVS, Aramis, PRT2000 (Raytheon), Monocab/ROMAG, EcoMobility, Tubenet Transit Systems

== History ==
=== Origins ===
Modern PRT concepts began around 1953 when Donn Fichter, a city transportation planner, began research on PRT and alternative transportation methods. In 1964, Fichter published a book which proposed an automated public transit system for areas of medium to low population density. One of the key points made in the book was Fichter's belief that people would not leave their cars in favor of public transit unless the system offered flexibility and end-to-end transit times that were much better than existing systems – flexibility and performance he felt only a PRT system could provide. Several other urban and transit planners also wrote on the topic and some early experimentation followed, but PRT remained relatively unknown.

Around the same time, Edward Haltom was studying monorail systems. Haltom noticed that the time to start and stop a conventional large monorail train, like those of the Wuppertal Schwebebahn, meant that a single line could only support between 20 and 40 vehicles an hour. In order to get reasonable passenger movements on such a system, the trains had to be large enough to carry hundreds of passengers (see headway for a general discussion). This, in turn, demanded large guideways that could support the weight of these large vehicles, driving up capital costs to the point where he considered them unattractive.

Haltom turned his attention to developing a system that could operate with shorter timings, thereby allowing the individual cars to be smaller while preserving the same overall route capacity. Smaller cars would mean less weight at any given point, which meant smaller and less expensive guideways. To eliminate the backup at stations, the system used "offline" stations that allowed the mainline traffic to bypass the stopped vehicles. He designed the Monocab system using six-passenger cars suspended on wheels from an overhead guideway. Like most suspended systems, it suffered from the problem of difficult switching arrangements. Since the car rode on a rail, switching from one path to another required the rail to be moved, a slow process that limited the possible headways.

=== UMTA is formed ===
By the late 1950s the problems with urban sprawl were becoming evident in the United States. When cities improved roads and the transit times were lowered, suburbs developed at ever increasing distances from the city cores, and people moved out of the downtown areas. Lacking pollution control systems, the rapid rise in car ownership and the longer trips to and from work were causing significant air quality problems. Additionally, movement to the suburbs led to a flight of capital from the downtown areas, one cause of the rapid urban decay seen in the US.

Mass transit systems were one way to combat these problems. Yet during this period, the federal government was feeding the problems by funding the development of the Interstate Highway System, while at the same time funding for mass transit was being rapidly scaled back. Public transit ridership in most cities plummeted.

In 1962, President John F. Kennedy charged Congress with the task of addressing these problems. These plans came to fruition in 1964, when President Lyndon B. Johnson signed the Urban Mass Transportation Act of 1964 into law, thereby forming the Urban Mass Transportation Administration. UMTA was set up to fund mass transit developments in the same fashion that the earlier Federal Aid Highway Act of 1956 had helped create the Interstate Highways. That is, UMTA would help cover the capital costs of building out new infrastructure.

=== PRT research starts ===
However, planners who were aware of the PRT concept were worried that building more systems based on existing technologies would not help the problem, as Fitcher had earlier noted. Proponents suggested that systems would have to offer the flexibility of a car:

The reason for the sad state of public transit is a very basic one – the transit systems just do not offer a service which will attract people away from their automobiles. Consequently, their patronage comes very largely from those who cannot drive, either because they are too young, too old, or because they are too poor to own and operate an automobile. Look at it from the standpoint of a commuter who lives in a suburb and is trying to get to work in the central business district (CBD). If he is going to go by transit, a typical scenario might be the following: he must first walk to the closest bus stop, let us say a five or ten minute walk, and then he may have to wait up to another ten minutes, possibly in inclement weather, for the bus to arrive. When it arrives, he may have to stand unless he is lucky enough to find a seat. The bus will be caught up in street congestion and move slowly, and it will make many stops completely unrelated to his trip objective. The bus may then let him off at a terminal to a suburban train. Again he must wait, and, after boarding the train, again experience a number of stops on the way to the CBD, and possibly again he may have to stand in the aisle. He will get off at the station most convenient to his destination and possibly have to transfer again onto a distribution system. It is no wonder that in those cities where ample inexpensive parking is available, most of those who can drive do drive.

In 1966, the United States Department of Housing and Urban Development was asked to "undertake a project to study ... new systems of urban transportation that will carry people and goods ... speedily, safely, without polluting the air, and in a manner that will contribute to sound city planning." The resulting report was published in 1968 and proposed the development of PRT, as well as other systems such as dial-a-bus and high-speed interurban links.

In the late 1960s, the Aerospace Corporation, an independent non-profit corporation set up by the US Congress, spent substantial time and money on PRT, and performed much of the early theoretical and systems analysis. However, this corporation is not allowed to sell to non-federal government customers. In 1969, members of the study team published the first widely publicized description of PRT in Scientific American. In 1978 the team also published a book. These publications sparked off a sort of "transit race" in the same sort of fashion as the space race, with countries around the world rushing to join what appeared to be a future market of immense size.

The oil crisis of 1973 made vehicle fuels more expensive, which naturally interested people in alternative transportation.

=== System developments ===
In 1967, aerospace giant Matra started the Aramis project in Paris. After spending about 500 million francs, the project was canceled when it failed its qualification trials in November 1987. The designers tried to make Aramis work like a "virtual train", but control software issues caused cars to bump unacceptably. The project ultimately failed.

Between 1970 and 1978, Japan operated a project called "Computer-controlled Vehicle System" (CVS). In a full-scale test facility, 84 vehicles operated at speeds up to 60 kilometres per hour (37.3 mph) on a 4.8 km (3.0 mi) guideway; one-second headways were achieved during tests. Another version of CVS was in public operation for six months from 1975 to 1976. This system had 12 single-mode vehicles and four dual-mode vehicles on a 1.6 km (1.0 mi) track with five stations. This version carried over 800,000 passengers. CVS was cancelled when Japan's Ministry of Land, Infrastructure and Transport declared it unsafe under existing rail safety regulations, specifically in respect of braking and headway distances.

On March 23, 1973, U.S. Urban Mass Transportation Administration (UMTA) administrator Frank Herringer testified before Congress: "A DOT program leading to the development of a short, one-half to one-second headway, high-capacity PRT (HCPRT) system will be initiated in fiscal year 1974." According to PRT supporter J. Edward Anderson, this was "because of heavy lobbying from interests fearful of becoming irrelevant if a genuine PRT program became visible." From that time forward people interested in HCPRT were unable to obtain UMTA research funding.

In 1975, the Morgantown Personal Rapid Transit project was completed. It has five off-line stations that enable non-stop, individually programmed trips along an 8.7-mile (14.0 km) track serviced by a fleet of 71 cars. This is a crucial characteristic of PRT. However, it is not considered a PRT system because its vehicles are too heavy and carry too many people. When it carries many people, it operates in a point-to-point fashion, instead of running like an automated people mover from one end of the line to the other. During periods of low usage all cars make a full circuit stopping at every station in both directions. Morgantown PRT is still in continuous operation at West Virginia University in Morgantown, West Virginia, with about 15,000 riders per day (as of 2003). The steam-heated track has proven expensive and the system requires an operation and maintenance budget of $5 million annually. Although it successfully demonstrated automated control and it is still operating it was not sold to other sites. A 2010 report concluded replacing the system with buses on roads would provide unsatisfactory service and create congestion. Subsequently, the forty year old computer and vehicle control systems were replaced in the 2010s and there are plans to replace the vehicles.

From 1969 to 1980, Mannesmann Demag and MBB cooperated to build the Cabinentaxi urban transportation system in Germany. Together the firms formed the Cabintaxi Joint Venture. They created an extensive PRT technology, including a test track, that was considered fully developed by the German government and its safety authorities. The system was to have been installed in Hamburg, but budget cuts stopped the proposed project before the start of construction. With no other potential projects on the horizon, the joint venture disbanded, and the fully developed PRT technology was never installed. Cabintaxi Corporation, a US-based company, obtained the technology in 1985, and remains active in the private-sector market trying to sell the system but so far there have been no installations.

In 1979 the three station Duke University Medical Center Patient Rapid Transit system was commissioned. Uniquely, the cars could move sideways, as well as backwards and forwards and it was described as a "horizontal elevator". The system was closed in 2009 to allow for expansion of the hospital.

In the 1990s, Raytheon invested heavily in a system called PRT 2000, based on technology developed by J. Edward Anderson at the University of Minnesota. Raytheon failed to install a contracted system in Rosemont, Illinois, near Chicago, when estimated costs escalated to US$50 million per mile, allegedly due to design changes that increased the weight and cost of the system relative to Anderson's original design. In 2000, rights to the technology reverted to the University of Minnesota, and were subsequently purchased by Taxi2000.

=== Later developments ===
In 1999 the 2getthere designed ParkShuttle system was opened in the Kralingen neighbourhood of eastern Rotterdam using 12-seater driverless buses. The system was extended in 2005 and new second-generation vehicles introduced to serve five stations over 1.8 kilometres (1.1 mi) with five grade crossings over ordinary roads. Operation is scheduled in peak periods and on demand at other times. In 2002, 2getthere operated twenty five 4-passenger "CyberCabs" at Holland's 2002 Floriade horticultural exhibition. These transported passengers along a track spiraling up to the summit of Big Spotters Hill. The track was approximately 600-metre (1,969 ft) long (one-way) and featured only two stations. The six-month operation was intended to research the public acceptance of PRT-like systems.

In 2010 a 10-vehicle (four seats each), two station 2getthere system was opened to connect a parking lot to the main area at Masdar City, UAE. The systems runs in an undercroft beneath the city and was supposed to be a pilot project for a much larger network, which would also have included transport of freight. Expansion of the system was cancelled just after the pilot scheme opened due to the cost of constructing the undercroft and since then other electric vehicles have been proposed.

In January 2003, the prototype ULTra ("Urban Light Transport") system in Cardiff, Wales, was certified to carry passengers by the UK Railway Inspectorate on a 1 km (0.6 mi) test track. ULTra was selected in October 2005 by BAA plc for London's Heathrow Airport. Since May 2011 a three-station system has been open to the public, transporting passengers from a remote parking lot to terminal 5. During the deployment of the system the owners of Heathrow became owners of the UltrPRT design. In May 2013 Heathrow Airport Limited included in its draft five-year (2014–2019) master plan a scheme to use the PRT system to connect terminal 2 and terminal 3 to their respective business car parks. The proposal was not included in the final plan due to spending priority given to other capital projects and has been deferred. If a third runway is constructed at Heathrow will destroy the existing system, which will be built over, will be replaced by another PRT.

In June 2006, a Korean/Swedish consortium, Vectus Ltd, started constructing a 400 m (1,312 ft) test track in Uppsala, Sweden. This test system was presented at the 2007 PodCar City conference in Uppsala. A 40-vehicle, 2-station, 4.46 km (2.8 mi) system called "SkyCube" was opened in Suncheon, South Korea, in April 2014.

In the 2010s the Mexican Western Institute of Technology and Higher Education began research into project LINT ("Lean Intelligent Network Transportation") and built a 1/12 operational scale model. This was further developed and became the Modutram system and a full-scale test track was built in Guadalajara, which was operational by 2014.

In 2018 it was announced that a PRT system would be installed at the new Chengdu Tianfu International Airport. The system will include 6 miles of guideway, 4 stations, and 22 pods and will connect airport parking to two terminal buildings. It is supplied by Ultra MTS. The airport opened in 2021, but as of 2025, the PRT system has yet to be commissioned.

In 2025 and 2026, Glydways announced its intention to launch PRT systems in Abu Dhabi and Dubai. In February 2026 construction began on a 0.5 mile guideway for a Glydways Automated Transit Network system in South Metro Atlanta, with a public test service due to launch in December 2026.

== System design ==
Among the handful of prototype systems (and the larger number that exist on paper) there is a substantial diversity of design approaches, some of which are controversial.

=== Vehicle design ===
Vehicle weight influences the size and cost of a system's guideways, which are in turn a major part of the capital cost of the system. Larger vehicles are more expensive to produce, require larger and more expensive guideways, and use more energy to start and stop. If vehicles are too large, point-to-point routing also becomes more expensive. Against this, smaller vehicles have more surface area per passenger (thus have higher total air resistance which dominates the energy cost of keeping vehicles moving at speed), and larger motors are generally more efficient than smaller ones.

The number of riders who will share a vehicle is a key unknown. In the U.S., the average car carries 1.16 persons, and most industrialized countries commonly average below two people; not having to share a vehicle with strangers is a key advantage of private transport. Based on these figures, some have suggested that two passengers per vehicle (such as with skyTran, EcoPRT and Glydways), or even a single passenger per vehicle is optimum. Other designs use a car for a model, and choose larger vehicles, making it possible to accommodate families with small children, riders with bicycles, disabled passengers with wheelchairs, or a pallet or two of freight.

==== Propulsion ====
All current designs (except for the human-powered Shweeb) are powered by electricity. In order to reduce vehicle weight, power is generally transmitted via lineside conductors although two of the operating systems use on-board batteries. According to the designer of Skyweb/Taxi2000, J. Edward Anderson, the lightest system uses linear induction motor (LIM) on the vehicle for both propulsion and braking, which also makes manoeuvres consistent regardless of the weather, especially rain or snow. LIMs are used in a small number of rapid transit applications, but most designs use rotary motors. Most such systems retain a small on-board battery to reach the next stop after a power failure. CabinTaxi uses a LIM and was able to demonstrate 0.5 second headways on its test track. The Vectus prototype system used continuous track mounted LIMs with the reaction plate on the vehicle, eliminating the active propulsion system (and power required) on the vehicle.

ULTra and 2getthere use on-board batteries, recharged at stations. This increases the safety, and reduces the complexity, cost and maintenance of the guideway. As a result, the ULTRa guideway resembles a sidewalk with curbs and is inexpensive to construct. ULTRa and 2getthere vehicles resembles small automated electric cars, and use similar components. (The ULTRa POD chassis and cabin have been used as the basis of a shared autonomous vehicle for running in mixed traffic.)

==== Switching ====
Almost all designs avoid track switching, instead advocating vehicle-mounted switches (which engage with special guiderails at the junctions) or conventional steering. Advocates say that vehicle-switching permits faster routing so vehicles can run closer together which increases capacity. It also simplifies the guideway, makes junctions less visually obtrusive and reduces the impact of malfunctions, because a failed switch on one vehicle is less likely to affect other vehicles.

Track switching greatly increases headway distance. A vehicle must wait for the previous vehicle to clear the junction, for the track to switch and for the switch to be verified. Communication between the vehicle and wayside controllers adds both delays and more points of failure. If the track switching is faulty, vehicles must be able to stop before reaching the switch, and all vehicles approaching the failed junction would be affected.

Mechanical vehicle switching minimizes inter-vehicle spacing or headway distance, but it also increases the minimum distances between consecutive junctions. A mechanically switching vehicle, maneuvering between two adjacent junctions with different switch settings, cannot proceed from one junction to the next. The vehicle must adopt a new switch position, and then wait for the in-vehicle switch's locking mechanism to be verified. If the vehicle switching is faulty, that vehicle must be able to stop before reaching the next switch, and all vehicles approaching the failed vehicle would be affected.

Conventional steering allows a simpler 'track' consisting only of a road surface with some form of reference for the vehicle's steering sensors. Switching would be accomplished by the vehicle following the appropriate reference line – maintaining a set distance from the left roadway edge would cause the vehicle to diverge left at a junction, for example.

=== Infrastructure design ===
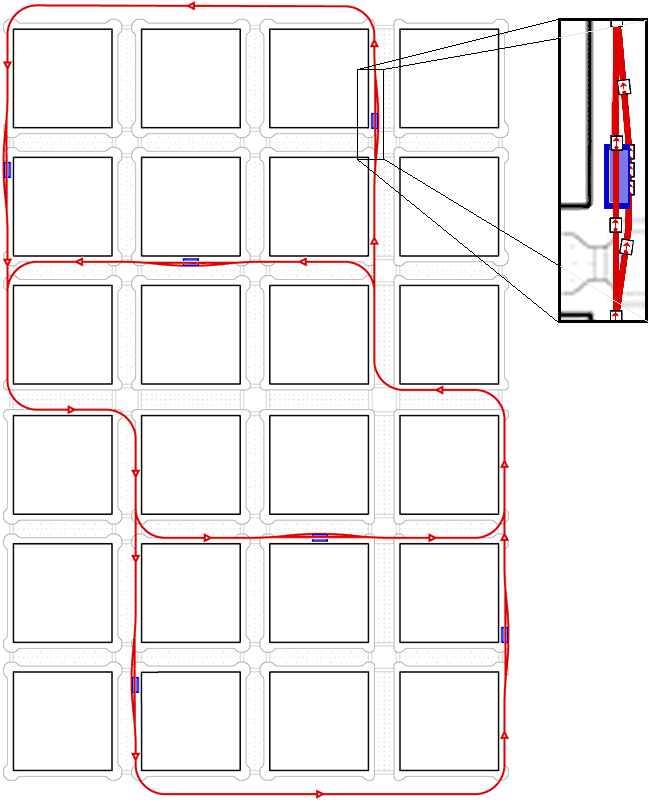
Simplified depiction of a possible PRT network. The blue rectangles indicate stations. The enlarged portion illustrates a station off-ramp.

==== Guideways ====
Several types of guideways have been proposed or implemented, including beams similar to monorails, bridge-like trusses supporting internal tracks, and cables embedded in a roadway. Most designs put the vehicle on top of the track, which reduces visual intrusion and cost, as well as easing ground-level installation. An overhead track is necessarily higher, but may also be narrower. Most designs use the guideway to distribute power and data communications, including to the vehicles. The Morgantown PRT failed its cost targets because of the steam-heated track required to keep the large channel guideway free of frequent snow and ice. Heating uses up to four times as much as energy as that used to propel the vehicles. Most proposals plan to resist snow and ice in ways that should be less expensive. The Heathrow system has a special de-icing vehicle. Masdar's system has been limited because the exclusive right-of-way for the PRT was gained by running the vehicles in an undercroft at ground-level while building an elevated "street level" between all the buildings. This led to unrealistically expensive buildings and roads.

==== Stations ====
Proposals usually have stations close together, and located on side tracks so that through traffic can bypass vehicles picking up or dropping off passengers. Each station might have multiple berths, with perhaps one-third of the vehicles in a system being stored at stations waiting for passengers. Stations are envisioned to be minimalistic, without facilities such as rest rooms. For elevated stations, an elevator may be required for accessibility.

At least one system, Metrino, provides wheelchair and freight access by using a cogway in the track, so that the vehicle itself can go from a street-level stop to an overhead track.

Some designs have included substantial extra expense for the track needed to decelerate to and accelerate from stations. In at least one system, Aramis, this nearly doubled the width and cost of the required right-of-way and caused the nonstop passenger delivery concept to be abandoned. Other designs have schemes to reduce this cost, for example merging vertically to reduce the footprint.

=== Operational characteristics ===
==== Headway distance ====
Spacing of vehicles on the guideway influences the maximum passenger capacity of a track, so designers prefer smaller headway distances. Computerized control and active electronic braking (of motors) theoretically permit much closer spacing than the two-second headways recommended for cars at speed. In these arrangements, multiple vehicles operate in "platoons" and can be braked simultaneously. There are prototypes for automatic guidance of private cars based on similar principles.

Very short headways are controversial. The UK Railway Inspectorate has evaluated the ULTra design and is willing to accept one-second headways, pending successful completion of initial operational tests at more than 2 seconds. In other jurisdictions, preexisting rail regulations apply to PRT systems (see CVS, above); these typically calculate headways for absolute stopping distances with standing passengers. These severely restrict capacity and make PRT systems infeasible. Another standard said trailing vehicles must stop if the vehicle in front stopped instantaneously (or like a "brick wall"). In 2018 a committee of the American Society of Mechanical Engineers considered replacing the "brick wall" standard with a requirement for vehicles to maintain a safe "separation zone" based on the minimum stopping distance of the lead vehicle and the maximum stopping of the trailing vehicle. These changes were introduced into the standard in 2021.

==== Capacity ====
PRT is usually proposed as an alternative to rail systems, so comparisons tend to be with rail. PRT vehicles seat fewer passengers than trains and buses, and must offset this by combining higher average speeds, diverse routes, and shorter headways. Proponents assert that equivalent or higher overall capacity can be achieved by these means.

===== Single line capacity =====
With two-second headways and four-person vehicles, a single PRT line can achieve theoretical maximum capacity of 7,200 passengers per hour. However, most estimates assume that vehicles will not generally be filled to capacity, due to the point-to-point nature of PRT. At a more typical average vehicle occupancy of 1.5 persons per vehicle, the maximum capacity is 2,700 passengers per hour. Some researchers have suggested that rush hour capacity can be improved if operating policies support ridesharing.

Capacity is inversely proportional to headway. Therefore, moving from two-second headways to one-second headways would double PRT capacity. Half-second headways would quadruple capacity. Theoretical minimum PRT headways would be based on the mechanical time to engage brakes, and these are much less than a half second. Researchers suggest that high capacity PRT (HCPRT) designs could operate safely at half-second headways, which has already been achieved in practice on the Cabintaxi test track in the late 1970s. Using the above figures, capacities above 10,000 passengers per hour seem in reach.

In simulations of rush hour or high-traffic events, about one-third of vehicles on the guideway need to travel empty to resupply stations with vehicles in order to minimize response time. This is analogous to trains and buses travelling nearly empty on the return trip to pick up more rush hour passengers.

Grade separated light rail systems can move 15-30,000 passengers per hour on a fixed route. Street level systems typically move up to 10,000 passengers per hour. Heavy rail subways may have capacities of 60,000 passengers per hour or more. As with PRT, these estimates depend on a number of factors including availability of vehicles.

Neither light nor heavy rail scales operated efficiently in off-peak when capacity utilization is low but a schedule must be maintained. In a PRT system when demand is low, surplus vehicles will be configured to stop at empty stations at strategically placed points around the network. This enables an empty vehicle to quickly be despatched to wherever it is required, with minimal waiting time for the passenger. PRT systems will have to re-circulate empty vehicles if there is an imbalance in demand along a route, as is common in peak periods.

===== Networked PRT capacity =====
The above discussion compares line or corridor capacity and may therefore not be relevant for a networked PRT system, where several parallel lines (or parallel components of a grid) carry traffic. In addition, Muller estimated that while PRT may need more than one guideway to match the capacity of a conventional system, the capital cost of the multiple guideways may still be less than that of the single guideway conventional system. Thus comparisons of line capacity should also consider the cost per line.

PRT systems should require much less horizontal space than existing metro systems, with individual cars being typically around 50% as wide for side-by-side seating configurations, and less than 33% as wide for single-file configurations. This is an important factor in densely populated, high-traffic areas.

==== Travel speed ====
For a given peak speed, nonstop journeys are about three times as fast as those with intermediate stops. This is not just because of the time for starting and stopping. Scheduled vehicles are also slowed by boardings and exits for multiple destinations.

Therefore, a given PRT seat transports about three times as many passenger miles per day as a seat performing scheduled stops. So PRT should also reduce the number of needed seats threefold for a given number of passenger miles.

While a few PRT designs have operating speeds of 100 km/h (62 mph), and one as high as 241 km/h (150 mph), most are in the region of 40–70 km/h (25–43 mph). Rail systems generally have higher maximum speeds, typically 90–130 km/h (56–81 mph) and sometimes well in excess of 160 km/h (99 mph), but average travel speed is reduced about threefold by scheduled stops and passenger transfers.

==== Ridership attraction ====
If PRT designs deliver the claimed benefit of being substantially faster than cars in areas with heavy traffic, simulations suggest that PRT could attract many more car drivers than other public transit systems. Standard mass transit simulations accurately predict that 2% of trips (including cars) will switch to trains. Similar methods predict that 11% to 57% of trips would switch to PRT, depending on its costs and delays.

==== Control algorithms ====
The typical control algorithm places vehicles in imaginary moving "slots" that go around the loops of track. Real vehicles are allocated a slot by track-side controllers. Traffic jams are prevented by placing north–south vehicles in even slots, and east/west vehicles in odd slots. At intersections, the traffic in these systems can interpenetrate without slowing.

On-board computers maintain their position by using a negative feedback loop to stay near the center of the commanded slot. Early PRT vehicles measured their position by adding up the distance using odometers, with periodic check points to compensate for cumulative errors. Next-generation GPS and radio location could measure positions as well.

Another system, "pointer-following control", assigns a path and speed to a vehicle, after verifying that the path does not violate the safety margins of other vehicles. This permits system speeds and safety margins to be adjusted to design or operating conditions, and may use slightly less energy. The maker of the ULTra PRT system reports that testing of its control system shows lateral (side-to-side) accuracy of 1 cm, and docking accuracy better than 2 cm.

==== Safety ====
Computer control eliminates errors from human drivers, so PRT designs in a controlled environment should be much safer than private motoring on roads. Most designs enclose the running gear in the guideway to prevent derailments. Grade-separated guideways would prevent conflict with pedestrians or manually controlled vehicles. Other public transit safety engineering approaches, such as redundancy and self-diagnosis of critical systems, are also included in designs.

The Morgantown system, more correctly described as a Group Rapid Transit (GRT) type of Automated Guideway Transit system (AGT), has completed 100 million passenger-miles without serious injury.

As with many current transit systems, personal passenger safety concerns are likely to be addressed through CCTV monitoring, and communication with a central command center from which engineering or other assistance may be dispatched.

==== Energy efficiency ====
The energy efficiency advantages claimed by PRT proponents include two basic operational characteristics of PRT: an increased average load factor; and the elimination of intermediate starting and stopping.

Average load factor, in transit systems, is the ratio of the total number of riders to the total theoretical capacity. A transit vehicle running at full capacity has a 100% load factor, while an empty vehicle has 0% load factor. If a transit vehicle spends half the time running at 100% and half the time running at 0%, the average load factor is 50%. Higher average load factor corresponds to lower energy consumption per passenger, so designers attempt to maximize this metric.

Scheduled mass transit (i.e. buses or trains) trades off service frequency and load factor. Buses and trains must run on a predefined schedule, even during off-peak times when demand is low and vehicles are nearly empty. So to increase load factor, transportation planners try to predict times of low demand, and run reduced schedules or smaller vehicles at these times. This increases passengers' wait times. In many cities, trains and buses do not run at all at night or on weekends.

PRT vehicles, in contrast, would only move in response to demand, which places a theoretical lower bound on their average load factor. This allows 24-hour service without many of the costs of scheduled mass transit.

ULTra PRT estimates its system will consume 839 BTU per passenger mile (0.55 MJ per passenger km). By comparison, cars consume 3,496 BTU, and personal trucks consume 4,329 BTU per passenger mile.

Due to PRT's efficiency, some proponents say solar becomes a viable power source. PRT elevated structures provide a ready platform for solar collectors, therefore some proposed designs include solar power as a characteristic of their networks.

For bus and rail transit, the energy per passenger-mile depends on the ridership and the frequency of service. Therefore, the energy per passenger-mile can vary significantly from peak to non-peak times. In the US, buses consume an average of 4,318 BTU/passenger-mile, transit rail 2,750 BTU/passenger-mile, and commuter rail 2,569 BTU/passenger-mile.

== Opposition and controversy ==
Opponents to PRT schemes have expressed a number of concerns:

=== Technical feasibility debate ===
In 1996, Vukan R. Vuchic, professor of Transportation Engineering at the University of Pennsylvania and a proponent of traditional forms of transit, stated his belief that the combination of small vehicles and expensive guideway makes it highly impractical in both cities (not enough capacity) and suburbs (guideway too expensive). According to Vuchic: "...the PRT concept combines two mutually incompatible elements of these two systems: very small vehicles with complicated guideways and stations. Thus, in central cities, where heavy travel volumes could justify investment in guideways, vehicles would be far too small to meet the demand. In suburbs, where small vehicles would be ideal, the extensive infrastructure would be economically unfeasible and environmentally unacceptable."

PRT supporters claimed that Vuchic's conclusions are based on flawed assumptions. PRT proponent J.E. Anderson wrote, in a rebuttal to Vuchic: "I have studied and debated with colleagues and antagonists every objection to PRT, including those presented in papers by Professor Vuchic, and find none of substance. Among those willing to be briefed in detail and to have all of their questions and concerns answered, I find great enthusiasm to see the system built."

The manufacturers of ULTra acknowledge that current forms of their system would provide insufficient capacity in high-density areas such as central London, and that the investment costs for the tracks and stations are comparable to building new roads, making the current version of ULTra more suitable for suburbs and other moderate capacity applications, or as a supplementary system in larger cities.

=== Regulatory concerns ===
Possible regulatory concerns include emergency safety, headways, and accessibility for the disabled. Many jurisdictions regulate PRT systems as if they were trains. At least one successful prototype, CVS, failed deployment because it could not obtain permits from regulators.

Several PRT systems have been proposed for California, but the California Public Utilities Commission (CPUC) states that its rail regulations apply to PRT, and these require railway-sized headways. The degree to which CPUC would hold PRT to "light rail" and "rail fixed guideway" safety standards is not clear because it can grant particular exemptions and revise regulations.

Other forms of automated transit have been approved for use in California, notably the Airtrain system at SFO. CPUC decided not to require compliance with General Order 143-B (for light rail) since Airtrain has no on-board operators. They did require compliance with General Order 164-D which mandates a safety and security plan, as well as periodic on-site visits by an oversight committee.

If safety or access considerations require the addition of walkways, ladders, platforms or other emergency/disabled access to or egress from PRT guideways, the size of the guideway may be increased. This may impact the feasibility of a PRT system, though the degree of impact would depend on both the PRT design and the municipality.

=== Concerns about PRT research ===
Wayne D. Cottrell of the University of Utah conducted a critical review of PRT academic literature since the 1960s. He concluded that there are several issues that would benefit from more research, including urban integration, risks of PRT investment, bad publicity, technical problems, and competing interests from other transport modes. He suggests that these issues, "while not unsolvable, are formidable," and that the literature might be improved by better introspection and criticism of PRT. He also suggests that more government funding is essential for such research to proceed, especially in the United States.

=== New urbanist opinion ===
Several proponents of new urbanism, an urban design movement that advocates for walkable cities, have expressed opinions on PRT.

Peter Calthorpe and Sir Peter Hall have supported the concept, but James Howard Kunstler disagrees.

=== PRT vs. autonomous vehicles ===
As the development of self-steering technology for autonomous cars and shuttles advances, the guideway technology of PRT seems obsolete at first glance. Automated operation might become feasible on existing roads too. On the other hand, PRT systems can also make use of self-steering technology and significant benefits remain from operating on a segregated route network.

== See also ==
- Vehicular automation#Shared autonomous vehicles
- Alternatives to car use
- Demand responsive transport – Shared transport services based only on demand without fixed routes or timetables
- Duke University Medical Center Patient Rapid Transit, a permanently discontinued personnel rapid transit system
- Inductrack (An inexpensive form of magnetic levitation.)
- Parry People Movers – Very light rail manufacturer
- Personal transporter
- Shweeb (Human-powered PRT)
- Slope car
- Microtransit
- Robotaxi
