= Dashaveyor =

Automated guideway transit (AGT) system developed during the 1960s and 1970s

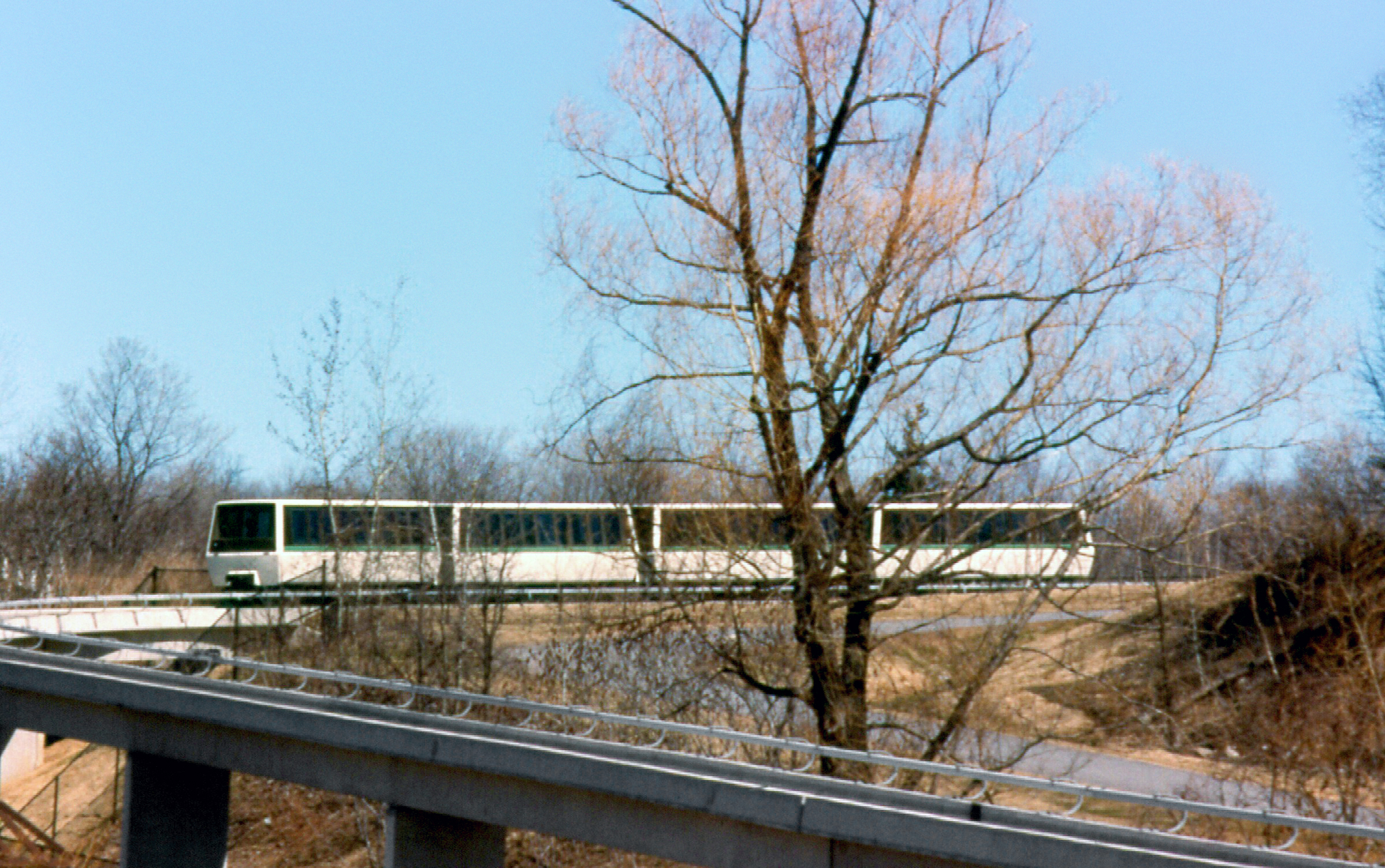
Dashaveyors arranged into a four-car train at the Toronto Zoo. Note the low height of the guideway sidewalls.

The Dashaveyor was an automated guideway transit (AGT) system developed during the 1960s and 1970s.

Originally developed by the Dashaveyor Company for moving cargo, the system used motorized pallets that could be routed on the fly to any destination in an extended network. The pallets could run at high speeds between stations, climb steep grades at slower speeds, and even climb vertically. They were designed to replace several manned vehicles with a single automated one, controlled from a central operating station. One such system was installed and operated at the White Pine mine from 1968 to 1972, but was considered a failure.

Bendix Corporation purchased the rights to the basic Dashaveyor system in order to use it as the basis for an AGT system during the heyday of urban transport research in the late 1960s. Often referred to as the Bendix-Dashaveyor in this form, the system used the basic design of the cargo system, but with a larger passenger body running on rubber wheels. Only one such system was installed, the 5 km long Toronto Zoo Domain Ride which operated from 1976 until a lack of proper maintenance led to an accident that forced its closure in 1994.

== History ==
=== Original design ===
The Dashaveyor concept started with Stanley Dashew, a prolific inventor who is best known for building the embossing machines used to produce the BankAmericard, the first plastic bank credit card system, which later evolved into Visa.

Dashew moved into the area of offshore oil loading in the 1960s, and was instrumental in the creation of the single-point mooring systems used in modern terminals, as well as the omnidirectional thrusters used to maneuver the ships up to the moors. As a part of these developments, Dashew became interested in using similar offshore mooring to handle bulk freight as well, especially container shipping which was rapidly dominating the industry. After consulting with experts in the automated warehousing field for several months, he incorporated the Dashveyor Company in 1963 in California to develop these ideas.

The company's solution to this problem was an automated conveyor, similar to the track-based systems being introduced for industrial automation and warehousing systems. Unlike those systems, however, the mooring points were so far offshore that the movement from the ship to the land-side terminal would be a significant delay. The system they designed operated at speeds up to 80 mph (130 km/h) in order to reduce these delays. A variety of options were available to improve flexibility. The cars were normally powered by two electric motors spinning steel wheels that ran on steel rails at high speeds, but could optionally include a traction gear that engaged rack gears between the running rails that allowed them to climb high grades at lower speeds. Optional elevator-like systems allowed the cars to move vertically as well.

The idea was to build an offshore terminal with docks equipped with Dashaveyor tracks instead of a conventional container shipping port on land. An operator would load containers onto Dashaveyor cars, which would then enter a tunnel to move them at high speed to the shore. There they would exit the tunnel and automatically drive the container to its storage location, and optionally lift it to stack them. In a Dashaveyor equipped port, a single vehicle would pick up, move and stack the containers. Normally each of these steps required a separate, manned, vehicle. Additionally, the ships never had to enter port, which had major advantages in terms of siting and construction.

The system would also be useful for similar roles where any sort of freight was being moved from point to point using custom vehicles; the company advertised the system for mining, trans-shipping, large factory automation and warehousing.

=== White Pine ===
In 1965 the Copper Range company decided to dig a new shaft at their White Pine mine in Michigan. Copper Range was involved in a number of different technology projects, and for the new shaft they decided to experiment with automated ore hauling to the nearby mill. They reached an agreement with Dashaveyor in 1966 to install a pilot system, and when this proved successful, the two companies signed a contract for a complete system.

Starting in 1967, workers laid 27,000 feet (8,200 m) of guideway rail for about $2.5 million. The rails consisted of two I-beams for the running wheels, with an optional rack gear on the bottom that could be engaged to allow the cars to climb higher graded areas. The cars sat between the rails, hanging down between them, with doors on top that opened and closed automatically to keep the ore from falling out when in motion. Major portions of the network were enclosed in rectangular tubes to protect them from the elements, especially snow. The cars could be loaded at 5 mph (8.0 km/h) without stopping, and traveled at up to 52 mph (84 km/h) on straight sections of the track. Cars were normally linked to form small trains to increase route capacity, but could be detached to operate independently, all under the control of a single operator.

In 1972 Copper Range stated that "Design problems could not be solved" and that they were ending experiments with the system. This left the mine with no way to haul the ore from the new shaft to the mill, and they fell back on underground systems to bring the ore to the original shaft. The new shaft was used for ventilation after this point.

=== AGT systems ===
In 1968 the US Department of Housing and Urban Development (HUD) published a series of reports, known simply as the HUD reports, that described the problems in modern cities due to the rapid expansion of suburbs in the 1950s. The rise of the suburbs led to a flight of capital from the city centres, which in turn led to the widespread urban decay seen in the 1960s.

The reports noted that cities with well-developed mass transportation systems avoided the worse of these problems. However, these systems were very expensive, and were only suitable for the densely populated areas of large cities. The reports called for a government-supported development project to design mass transit systems with greatly reduced capital and operating costs, making them suitable for less-dense environments. Busses and streetcars offered a solution, but as they traveled in traffic their speeds were not comparable to separated rail systems.

They key appeared to be to use smaller vehicles, which reduced the size of the entire system; stations, tracks and switches all took up less room and cost less to build. However, smaller vehicles also have lower passenger capacities, a problem for rush hour periods. In the 1960s a solution to this problem was becoming practical; using automated guideway transit (AGT) technologies, the cars could be made to run much closer together to improve capacity. Their small size and lack of a driver would improve economics; payrolls amount to 60% to 70% of the operating costs of traditional transportation systems.

When funding was announced in 1968, the US was in the midst of winding down construction for both the Vietnam War and Project Apollo, leaving the aerospace industry with a sudden lack of projects. Many of the HUD research funds were directed towards aerospace companies, and a wide variety of AGT programs followed.

=== Bendix-Dashaveyor ===
One of these companies was the Bendix Corporation, who found the Dashaveyor concept and decided it would make the basis for a competitive AGT system. Its main advantages in this role were its high speed and its ability to switch among a network of tracks. Most competing AGT systems operated at a fixed speed that was much lower than the Dashaveyor, and normally followed fixed routes. They purchased the company and turned it into a subsidiary, developing the AGT versions in Ann Arbor, Michigan.

Conversion to an AGT system was relatively straightforward. The steel wheels were replaced with rubber ones, which ran in a narrow concrete guideway structure instead of the I-beam rails. The guideway was roughly the size and shape of a pedestrian sidewalk, with short vertical extension on either side to form a U-shape. Small horizontal wheels at the front of the cars pressed against the vertical sections and guided the main wheels around corners. Power was provided via a third rail system attached to the top of the right vertical extension (as seen in the direction of travel).

The vehicle body was extended upward and generally enlarged to form a van-like structure holding 31 passengers. An image of the vehicle was published in Popular Science in its November 1971 edition in a story about personal rapid transit Each car had three sets of automated doors, entering into a set of facing seats. This divided the internal area into sections; it was not possible to walk the length of the vehicle, nor were there provisions for standing. They were normally operated in trains of two or four cars.

One of the earliest major sales efforts for the Dashaveyor AGT was a system for the Dallas Fort Worth International Airport. Bendix and Varo both received parts of a $1 million grant from the new Urban Mass Transit Administration to study the system. Both bids came in well over the airport's budget, and in the end it was won by the Vought Airtrans. A similar system for Newark International Airport ended when the entire project was put on hold.

In 1972, the company displayed the Dashaveyor as one of four major deployments shown at the Transpo '72 show in Washington, D.C. Like the other vendors, Bendix found little third-party interest in the AGT market, and was one of the first vendors to withdraw from the market, inactive by 1975.

=== Toronto Zoo ===
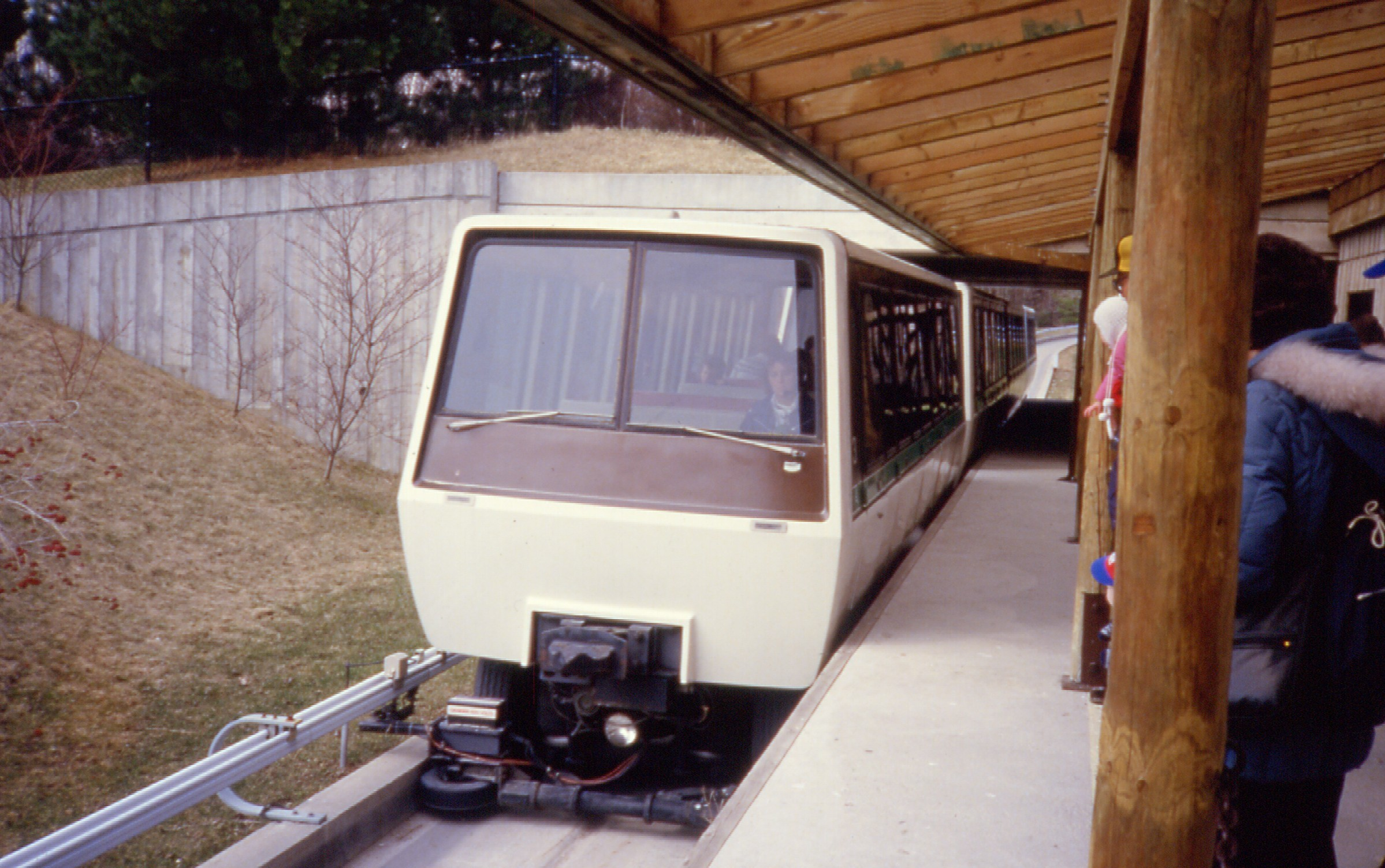
Details of the Dashaveyor's running gear are visible in this photo. The small horizontal wheels at the front steer the larger running wheels just visible behind them. The electrical supply uses a small 3rd rail shaped like a V with a pickup that pushes up on the bottom of it. The operator can also be seen in the front left of the cabin.

Bendix had found a customer willing to act as a prototype site, the new Toronto Zoo that would be opening in 1974. The zoo covered 700 acres (2.8 km^{2}), which made walking the site a difficult proposition. Boeing also entered a bid based on their new version of the Alden staRRcar. At the same time, the provincial government was in the midst of planning a major AGT system known as GO-Urban, and Bendix was one of many companies to bid for that project. The Zoo system would be an excellent demonstration for the GO-Urban decision.

For the zoo deployment, a greatly simplified operating system was needed. Since the schedules were relatively slow, on the order of 10 minutes between trains, the automated system was not needed. The cars were modified to place a small operator cabin at the front of some of them, entered through a separate door. Trains normally operated in four-car units, with the cabins facing front and rear. The rear-facing cabin was used while backing up the trains. The operator also doubled as the tour guide.

Three miles of track wound around the site, with a spur running to a maintenance depot at the northern end of the zoo. Most of the track was laid at ground level, although there were elevated portions above terrain features. In spite of operating on four wheels similar to a bus, the system was often referred to as a monorail. Twenty-four vehicles were purchased for the system, sometimes operating in four-car trains during periods of increased demand.

Known as the Toronto Zoo Domain Ride, the system opened in 1976. In March 1991 nine people were injured when two trains collided. In spite of a warning that major maintenance was needed to fix problems in the brakes and motors, in 1994 another accident occurred that injured thirty. The zoo was fined $43,000, and instead of fixing the system the board of directors decided to close the system, and operations ended that year.
