= Automated guideway transit =

Fully automated transit system

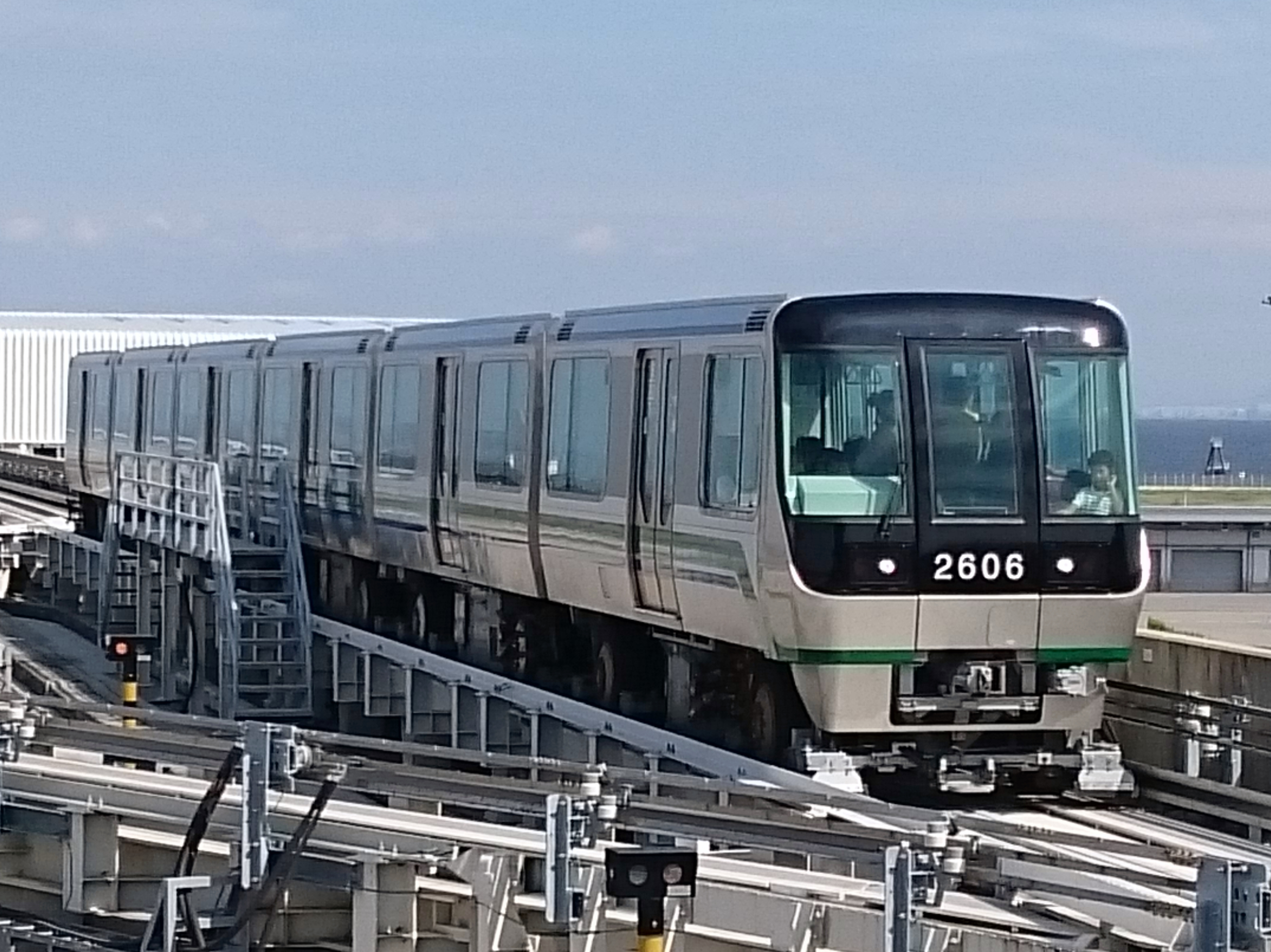
Port Island Line AGT, Kobe, Japan (the world's first mass transit AGT)

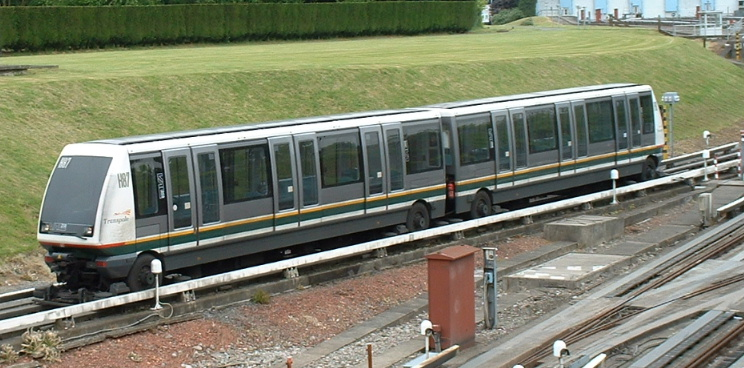
VAL-208 type train in the Lille Metro

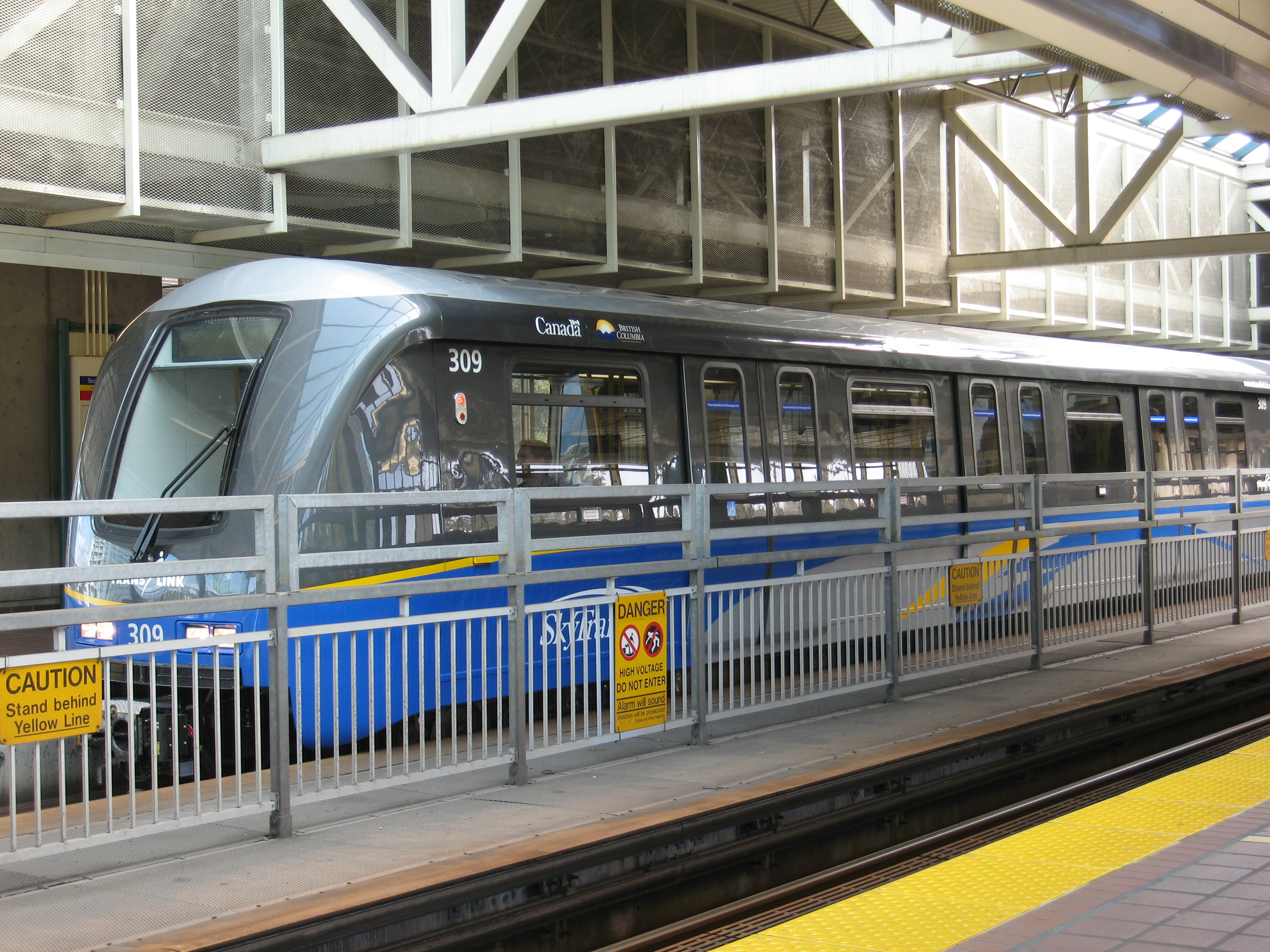
A Mark II train in Vancouver, Canada. The SkyTrain is the longest driverless transit system in the Americas.

An automated guideway transit (AGT) or automated fixed-guideway transit or automatic guideway transit system is a type of fixed guideway transit infrastructure with a riding or suspension track that supports and physically guides one or more driverless vehicles along its length. The vehicles are often rubber tired or steel wheeled, but other traction systems including air cushion, suspended monorail and maglev have been implemented. The guideway provides both physical support, like a road, as well as the guidance. An automated line can be cheaper to run than a conventional line, due to the shorter trains and stations.

AGT covers a wide variety of systems, from limited people mover systems commonly found at airports, to more complex automated train systems like the Vancouver SkyTrain. In the people mover role the term "automated people mover" (APM) is sometimes used, although this distinction is relatively rare because most people movers are automated. Larger systems span a variety of conceptual designs, from subway-like advanced rapid transit (ART) systems to smaller (typically two to six passengers) vehicles known as personal rapid transit (PRT) which offer direct point-to-point travel along a switched network.

== Origins in mass transit ==
AGT was originally developed as a means of providing mass transit services aimed at serving rider loads higher than those that could be served by buses or trams, but smaller than those served by conventional subways. Subways were too expensive to build in areas of lower density, such as smaller cities or the suburbs of larger ones, which often suffer the same gridlock problems as larger cities. Buses could be easily introduced in these areas, but did not offer the capacities or speeds that made them an attractive alternative to car ownership. Cars drive directly from origin to destination, while buses generally work on a hub-and-spoke model that can increase trip times.

AGT offered a solution that fit between these extremes. Much of the cost of a subway system is due to the large vehicle sizes, which demand large tunnels, large stations and considerable infrastructure throughout the system. The large vehicles are a side-effect of the need to have considerable space between the vehicles, known as "headway", for safety reasons due to the limited sightlines in tunnels. Given large headways and limited average speed due to stops, the only way to increase passenger capacity is to increase the size of the vehicle. Capital costs can be reduced by elevating the tracks instead of burying them, but the large tracks needed present a major visual barrier, and the steel-wheels-on-steel-rails are very noisy rounding bends.

Headway can be reduced via automation, a technique that was becoming feasible in the 1960s. As the headway is decreased, the size of vehicle needed to transport a given number of passengers per hour also decreases, which, in turn, decreases the infrastructure needed to support these smaller vehicles. Everything from track supports to station size can be reduced, with similar reductions in capital costs. Additionally, the lighter vehicles allow for a wider variety of suspension methods, from conventional steel wheels, to rubber tires, air cushion vehicles and maglevs. Since the system has to be automated in order to reduce the headways enough to be worthwhile, by automating the steering as well the operational costs can also be reduced compared to crewed vehicles.

One key problem in an automated system is the steering system's negotiation of turns in the right-of-way. The simplest solution is to use a rigid guideway, like conventional rails or steel rollercoasters. For lighter AGTs, these solutions were over-specified given the size of the vehicle, so the guideway was often separate from the running surface. Typical solutions used a single light rail embedded in the ground or attached to the guideway wall, with a wheel or slider that was pressed against the guideway rail and steered the running wheels through a linkage. A suspension-like system is needed to smooth out the imperfections in the guideway and provide a comfortable ride. More modern systems can eliminate the rail and replace it with a "virtual" one that is read by sensors on the vehicle without the need for any mechanical connection.

AGT systems, and the personal rapid transit concept (or "dial-a-cab"), became a major area of research after the publication of the HUD reports in 1968, and subsequent funding by the US Department of Transportation. Political support was particularity strong in states with large concentrations of aerospace companies; with the ending of Project Apollo and the winding down of the Vietnam War, there was concern that these companies would be left with few projects in the 1970s and 80s. Expecting widespread deployment of PRT systems through the late 1970s and 80s, many of the major US aerospace companies entered the AGT market, including Boeing, LTV and Rohr. Car companies followed suit, including General Motors and Ford. This, in turn, sparked off a wave of similar developments around the world.

However, the market for these systems proved to be overestimated, and only one of these US-designed small AGT's was constructed as a mass transit system, the Morgantown PRT.

== Small systems ==
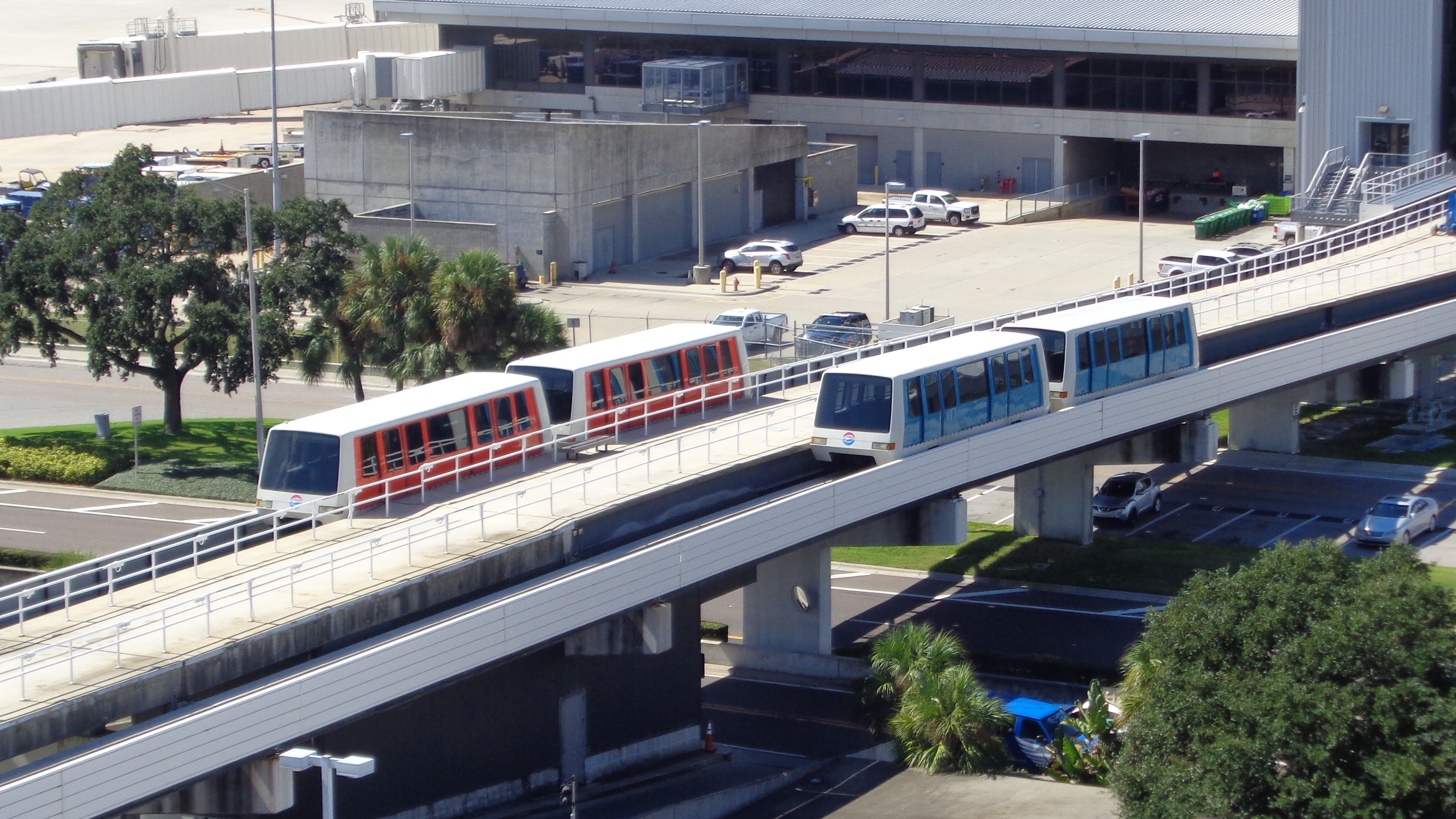
The Tampa International Airport People Movers

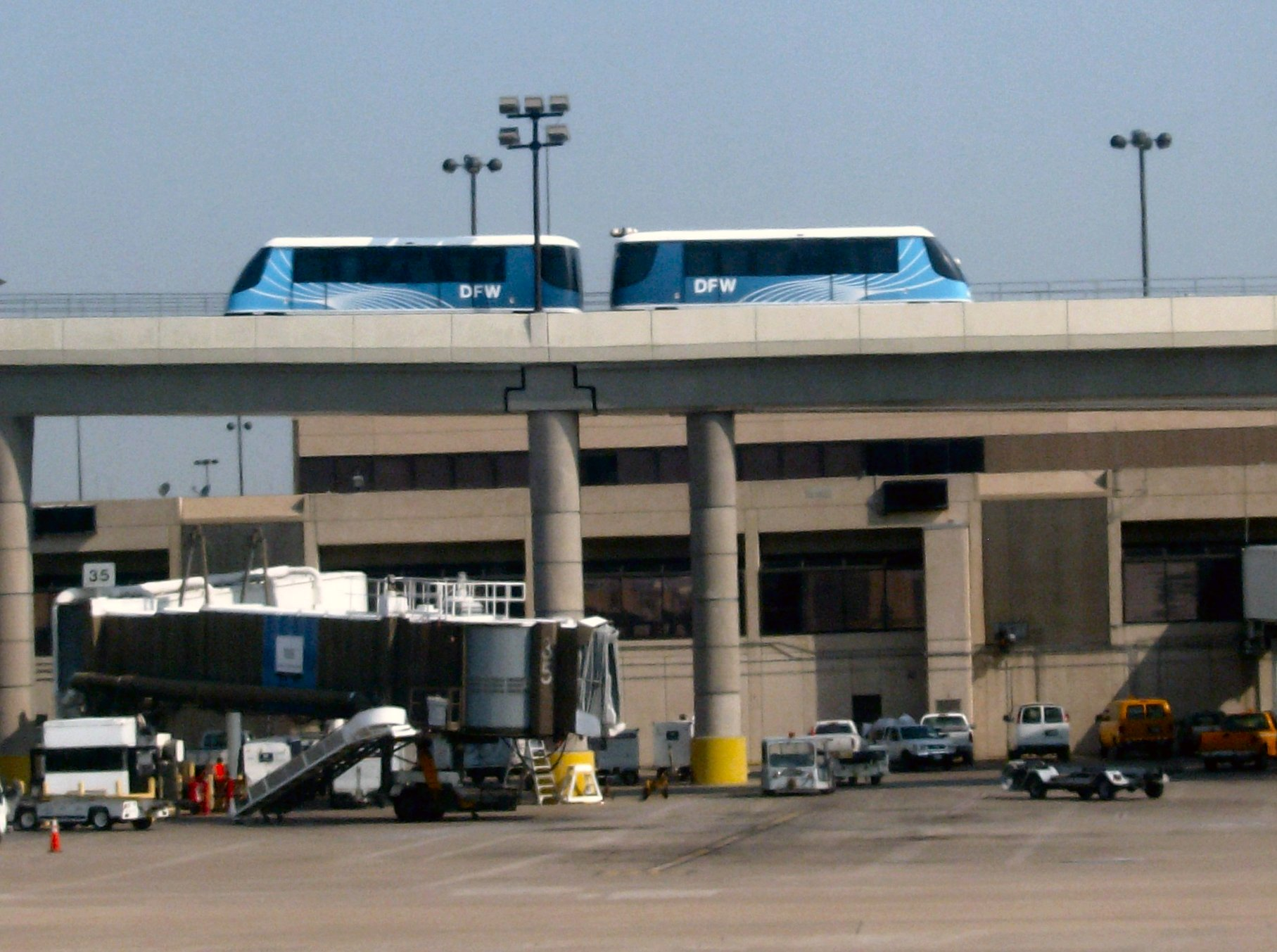
Skylink at Dallas/Fort Worth International Airport

Small scaled AGT systems are also known as people movers. Although the mass transit world showed a lack of interest, AGT systems quickly found a number of niche roles that they have continued to fill to this day. Tampa International Airport was the world's first to incorporate an AGT system as an inter-terminal connector in 1971. Its landside/airside set up allows the airport to increase capacity without spreading out. The LTV Airtrans was another early AGT systems which was installed at the Dallas/Fort Worth International Airport and went into operation in January 1975 (later replaced by the Skylink system in 2005). Similar systems followed at airports around the world, and today they are relatively universal at larger airports, often connecting terminals with distant long-term parking lots. Similar systems were also a fixture of a number of amusement parks, notably the Walt Disney World Monorail System and the Toronto Zoo Domain Ride. The Getty Center in Los Angeles uses a unique vertically oriented AGT to bring visitors from a parking lot off Interstate 405 to the Center at the top of a hill in Brentwood; this system places the motor outside the vehicle at the top of the guideway to reduce the weight lifted up the hill and thus improve efficiency. Small AGT systems are also used as circulator or feeder systems within urban centers. The city of Miami installed its Metromover system in 1986 and later extended it by 4.4 miles and added 12 new stations in 1994. Similar Innovia APM 100 systems operate in Singapore's Bukit Panjang district and in Guangzhou, China.

Over time, the aerospace firms that had initially designed most of these systems left the industry and sold off the AGT divisions to other companies. Most of these were picked up by existing transportation conglomerates, and through additional mergers and buyouts, many of these are today owned by either Siemens or Bombardier. During the same period, a number of new companies entered the field with systems designed solely for these smaller installations. Poma, Doppelmayr and the Leitner Group, better known for their ski lift systems, provide AGT systems for the airport market.

== Large systems ==
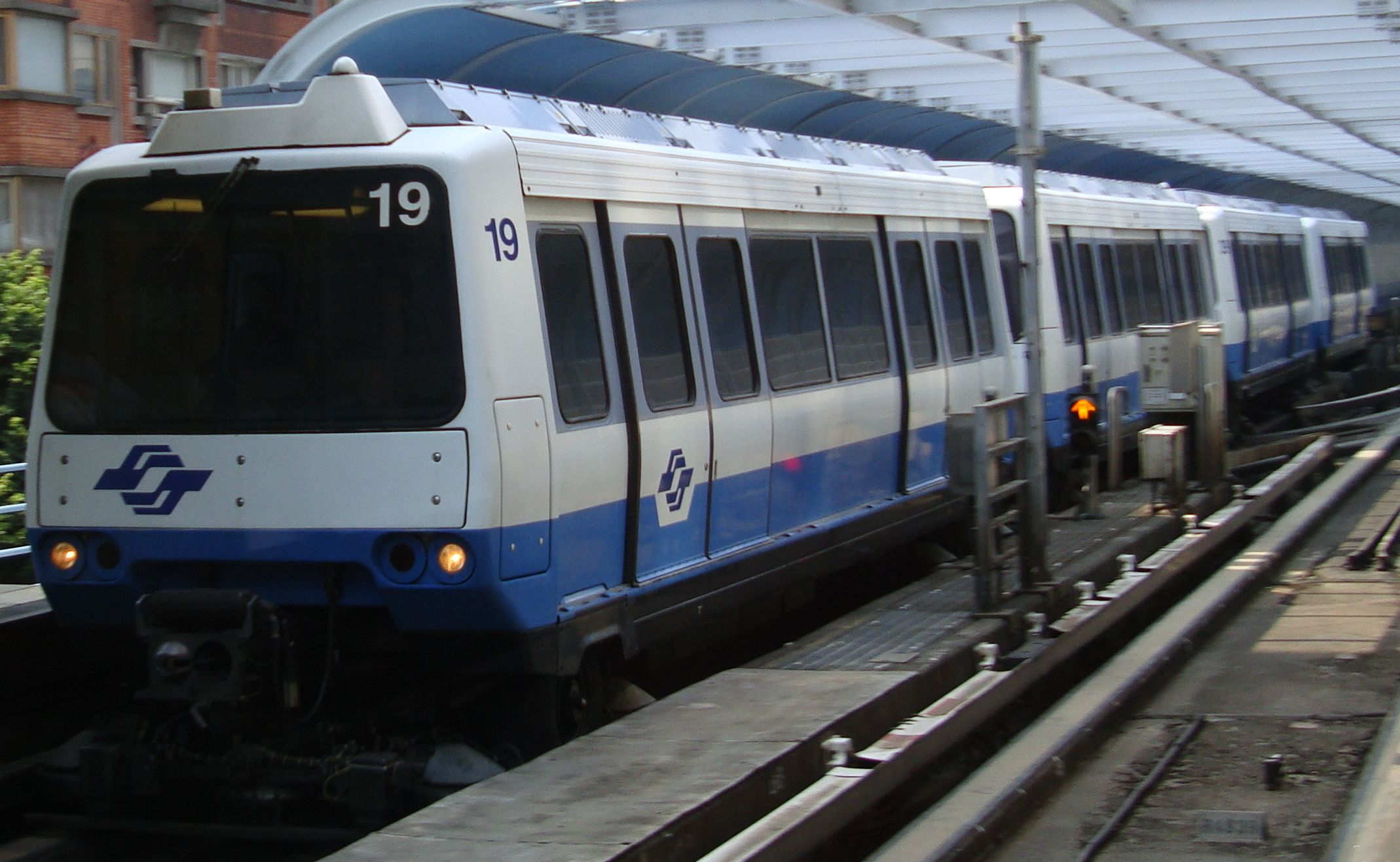
Taipei Metro VAL256 train on the Wenhu line

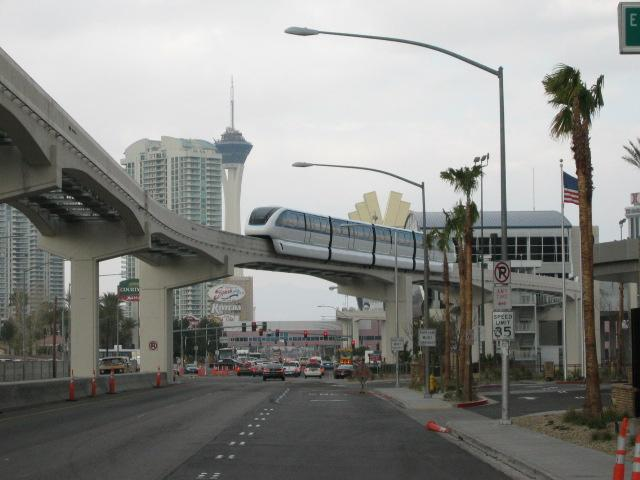
Las Vegas Monorail

Although the smaller vehicle systems were not successful in the marketplace, larger AGT were simpler to integrate into existing mass transit systems. Many higher capacity AGT systems that looked and operated in a fashion similar to a small subway have since become a common fixture of many existing metro systems, often as a way to serve outlying areas or as feeders to a metro system. Kobe's Port Liner is the world's first mass transit AGT, which began operating in 1981. It connects Kobe's main rail station, Sannomiya Station, with the dockyard areas and Kobe Airport to the south. Many similar systems have been built elsewhere in Japan. The Véhicule Automatique Léger (VAL) system in Lille, France, opened in 1983, is often cited as the first AGT installed to serve an existing urban area. Larger scale Innovia advanced rapid transit (ART) systems in Toronto, and Vancouver followed in the next few years, and then the Docklands Light Railway in London. VAL and ART systems have seen continued installations around the world such as in Airport Express in Beijing and have been joined by a variety of new systems with similar features, like the AnsaldoBreda Driverless Metro. Automated monorail systems, such as the Innovia Monorail 200 system in Las Vegas, are becoming more common AGT systems. Monorails are less obtrusive because they only require a single, narrow guidebeam.

== AGT renaissance ==
Once limited to larger airports and a small number of metro systems, AGT have undergone something of a renaissance since the late 1990s. Lower capital costs compared to conventional metros have allowed AGT systems to expand quickly, and many of these "small" systems now rival their larger counterparts in any measure. For instance, the Vancouver SkyTrain started operations in 1986, but has expanded so rapidly that its track length roughly matches the Toronto subway which pre-dates it by 30 years.

Although the original introduction of PRT systems did not result in the widespread adoption as expected, Morgantown Personal Rapid Transit in West Virginia's success, along with a renewed interest in new forms of transit, has led to several new PRT projects since 2000. London Heathrow Airport has installed a PRT system, known as ULTra, to connect Terminal 5 with the long-term carpark; its full operation began in September 2011.

== See also ==
- Autonomous Rapid Transit
- Automatic train operation
- Bus lane
- Guided bus
- Light metro
- Reserved track
- Roll way
- Rubber-tyred metro
- Rubber-tyred tram
