= Toronto Zoo Domain Ride =

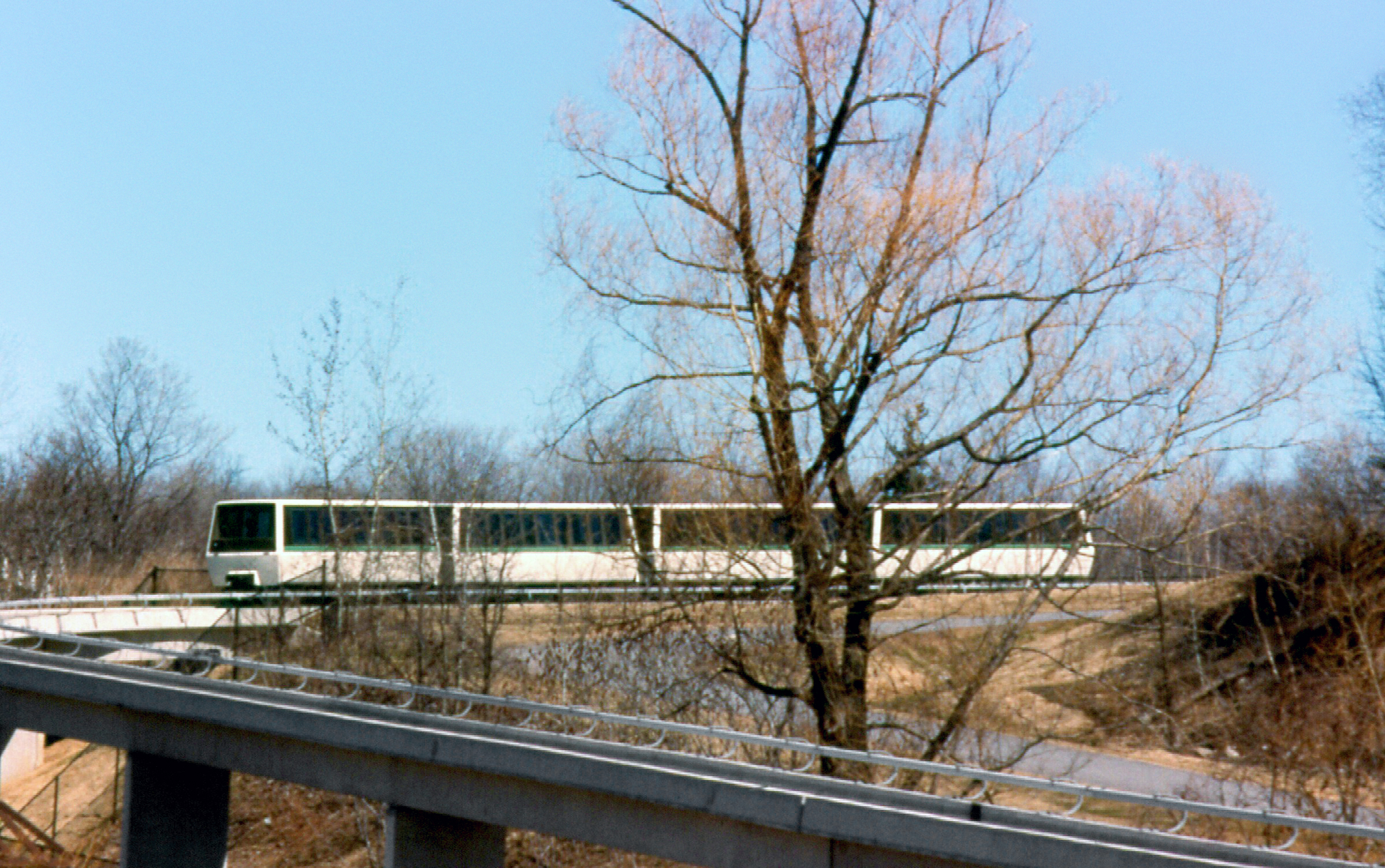

Overview
- Status: Closed and partially dismantled
- Owner: Metro Toronto Zoo
- Locale: Scarborough, Ontario, Canada
- Stations: 3 (expanded to 5)

Service
- Type: Automated guideway transit
- Operator: Metro Toronto Zoo
- Rolling stock: Bendix-Dashaveyor AGT

History
- Opened: July 1, 1976
- Closed: July 11, 1994

Technical
- Line length: 5.6 km (3.48 mi)
- Highest elevation: Elevated

The Toronto Zoo Domain Ride (also known as the Canadian Domain Ride) was an automated guideway transit (AGT) service used to carry visitors between sections, or "domains", of the Toronto Zoo. Though technologically closer to a simple rubber-tired metro, it was almost universally referred to as a "monorail".

The train began running on July 1, 1976, and closed on July 11, 1994, after a train lost power and rolled backwards down the track into a second train, injuring about 30 people. Parts of the line were subsequently taken over by the Zoomobile, an open-air tractor-drawn vehicle with five stations (Main Station, Canadian Domain Station, Africa Station, Americas Station) which had been operating since 1980.

== Ride details ==
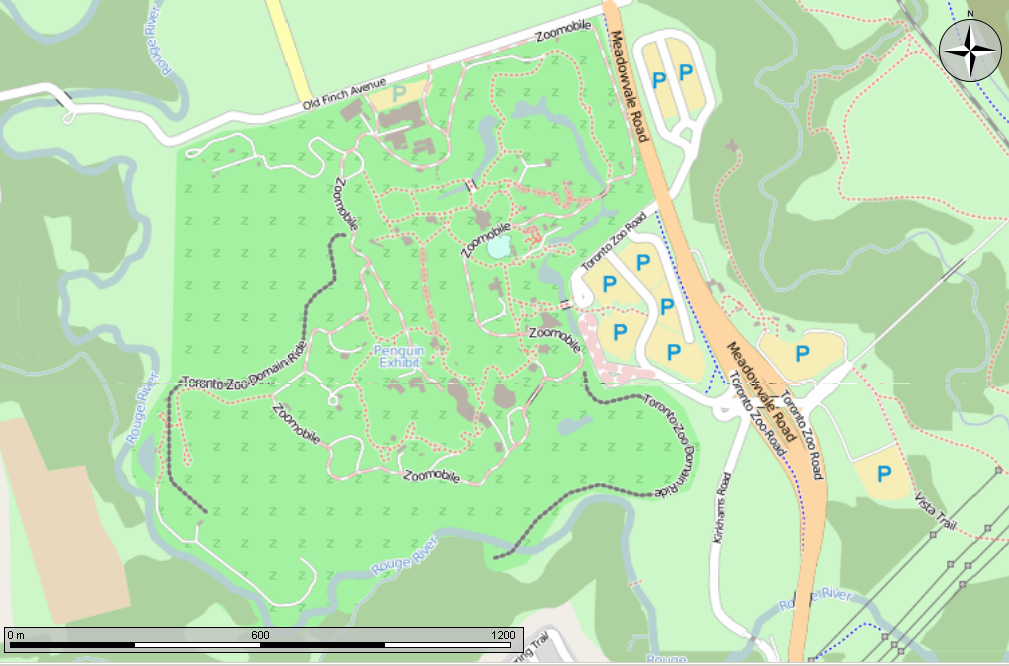
Map of the Toronto Zoo, with the partial Zoo Domain Ride sections shown as they exist in July 2013.

The vehicle was a rubber-wheeled AGT prototype developed by American firm Bendix-Dashaveyor. The train operated on a concrete guideway with electricity supplied by rails located above one side of the guideway. Passengers entered and left via doors located at each double row of facing seats. A secondary set of controls was available in the last car of the train to allow it to be reversed into the storage/service area located towards the north end of the zoo property.

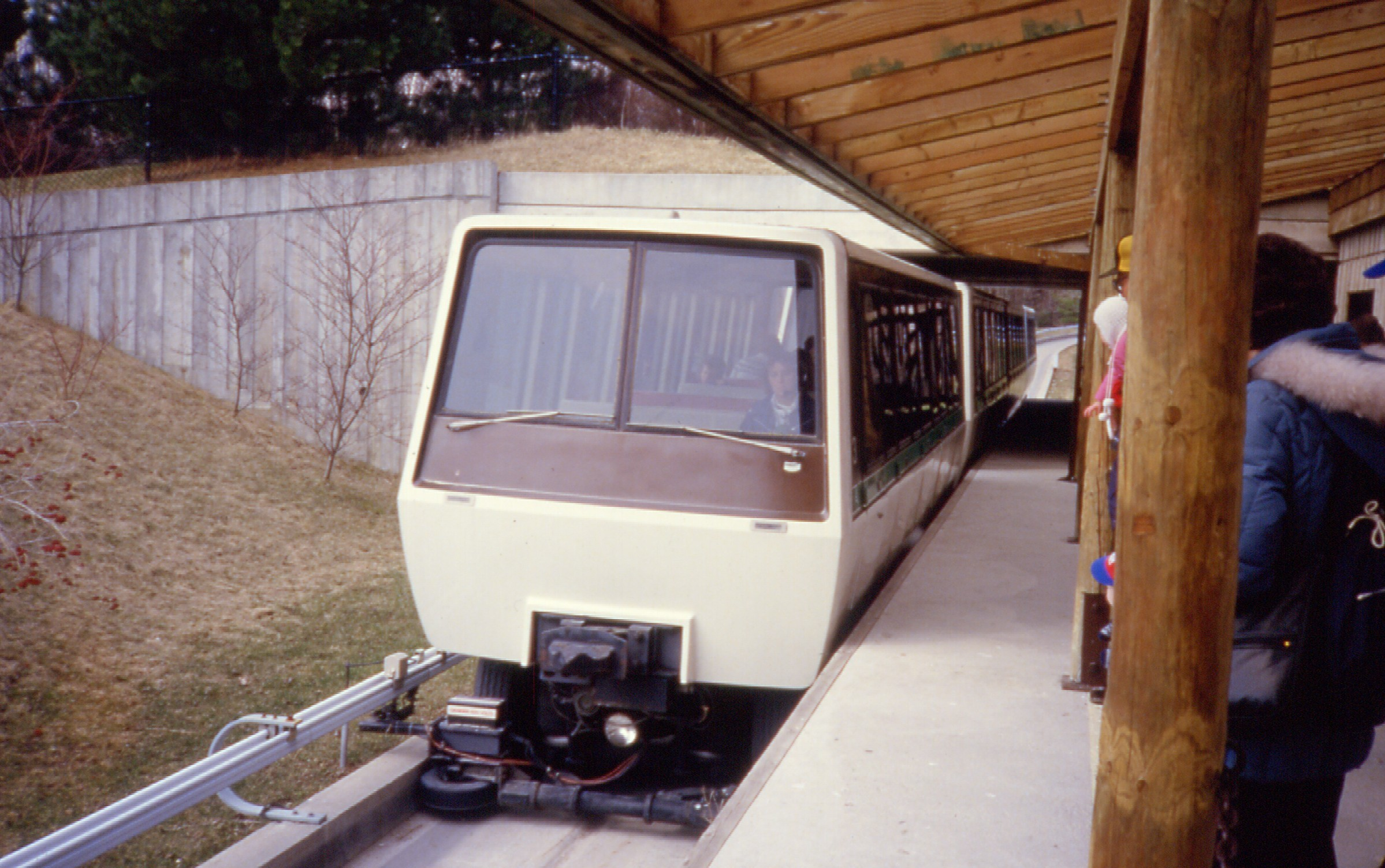
Details of the Dashaveyor's running gear are visible in this photo. The small horizontal wheels at the front steer the larger running wheels just visible behind them. The electrical supply uses a small 3rd rail shaped like a V with a pickup that pushes up on the bottom of it. The operator can also be seen in the front left of the cabin.

In addition to being a quick way to travel between sections of the zoo, the ride provided the only way to view several animals, in remote areas of the zoo. Moose, white-tailed deer and several other exhibits were not accessible from walking paths. The ride operator would provide commentary on the animals visible from the train during the ride.

Plans to scrap the vehicle and tracks dragged well past 1999. Portions of the guideway have now been removed, while others remain in place (overgrown by vegetation in many areas), but the electrical supply rails have been removed from the remaining portions of the guideway. Three stations remain in place: the Americas station stands behind closed gates, and the Weston station is still accessible for washrooms—the crumbling station platform can be seen from behind the chain barriers.

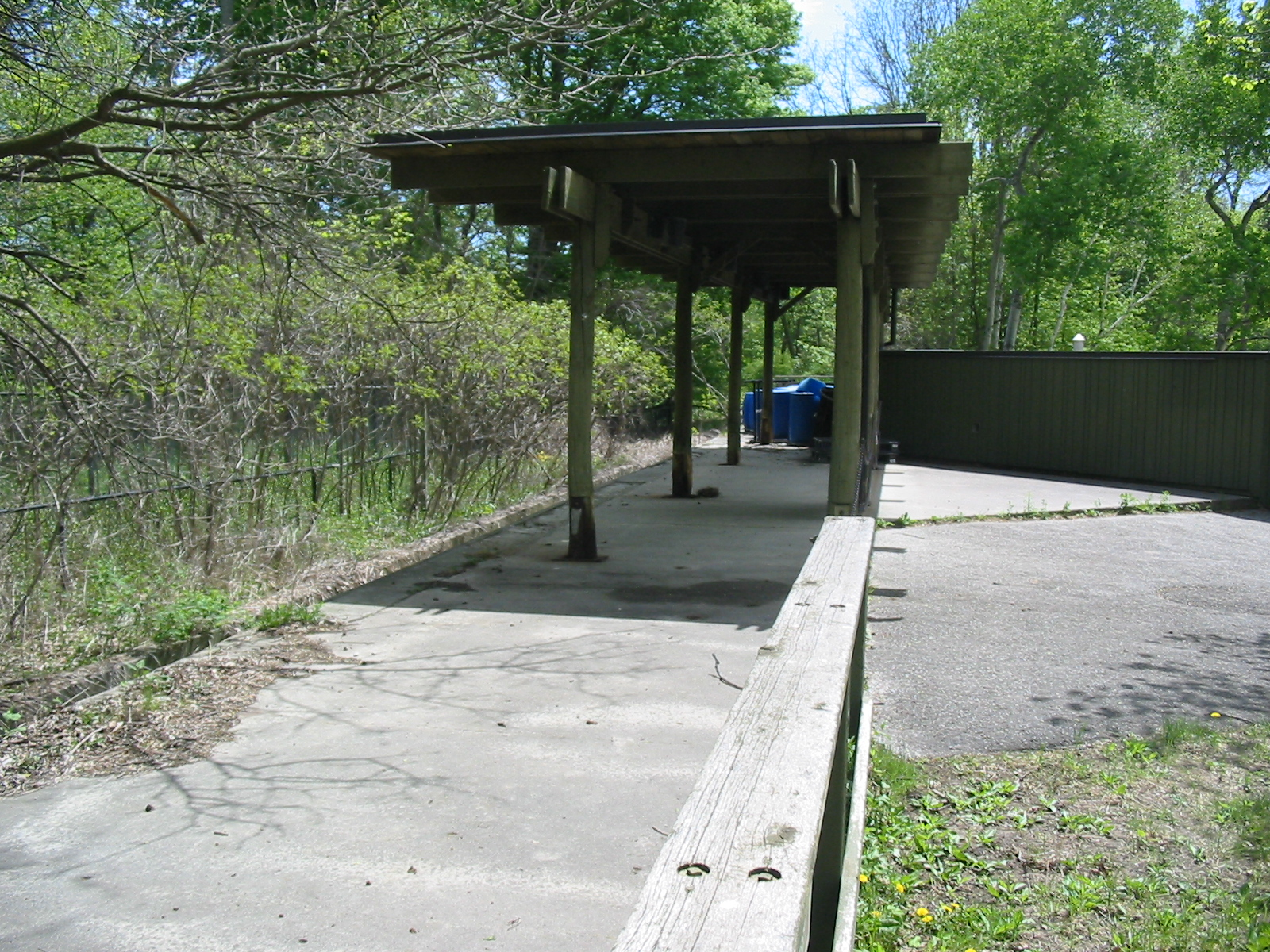
The Ruins of Weston Station in the Canadian Domain in May 2010.

The Main Station still remains to this day and is now used for several purposes: the Peacock Cafe, and the Main Zoomobile station.

== Accidents ==
During March break of 1991, nine people were injured when a train crashed into the rear of a second train that was stopped between stations. In December of that year, the Metro Zoo board of directors was warned that the monorail needed repair to its braking and propulsion systems in order to prevent future accidents.

On July 11, 1994, 37 people suffered injuries (including broken bones and whiplash) when one train crashed into a second that was in the process of loading. Upon leaving the Weston station, a train would have to climb a hill; however, at the top of the hill, the train lost power and rolled back into the station at an estimated 40 km/h (25 mph), slamming into the front of a second train that was loading. In general, trains would be spaced out by 15–20 minutes; however, due to a larger-than-usual attendance, trains were operating more frequently, and were more crowded too – the first train was carrying 60 passengers. As a result, the Zoo was fined C$43,000, and trial evidence indicated that the ride operator was "inadequately trained to handle the 'unusual situation'".

== Zoomobile ==
The current Zoomobile is a Chance Coach Sunliner tram with four cars set (carrying 103 passengers, 1 driver and 1 tour guide) that replaced the Domain Ride and vehicles have rubber tires running on along paved paths in the zoo. Unlike the Domain Ride, the Zoomobile uses open air cars.

== Successor ==
Zoo management has looked into plans for a maglev train operation replacing the Toronto Zoo Domain Ride. The Edmonton-based maglev consortium Magnovate, which includes Magna and Lockheed Martin, would pay for the construction, as well as the first five years of operation, while the zoo would pay for the operation afterwards. In November 2018, the deal was modified to the first 15 years of operation. The plan was approved by the Toronto Zoo board in December 2018. Construction was to begin after Magnovate raised sufficient funding to cover the estimated CA$25 million cost. The firm hoped to complete construction by 2021. However, this project is delayed due to the COVID-19 pandemic in Toronto.

Although unconfirmed by Toronto Zoo themselves, the creation of the maglev transport seems to have been postponed indefinitely due to a new plan for an aerial tramway. Further evidence of the maglev plans’ cancelation is in the 2022 masterplan booklet from Toronto Zoo where they had already created alternate plans in case the new maglev plans were cancelled. In this same document the maglev is described as something being constructed only if viable.

== See also ==
- Toronto Zoo
- Terminal Link
