= SkyTrain (Vancouver) rolling stock =

Fleet of automated trains in Metro Vancouver, Canada

SkyTrain rolling stock
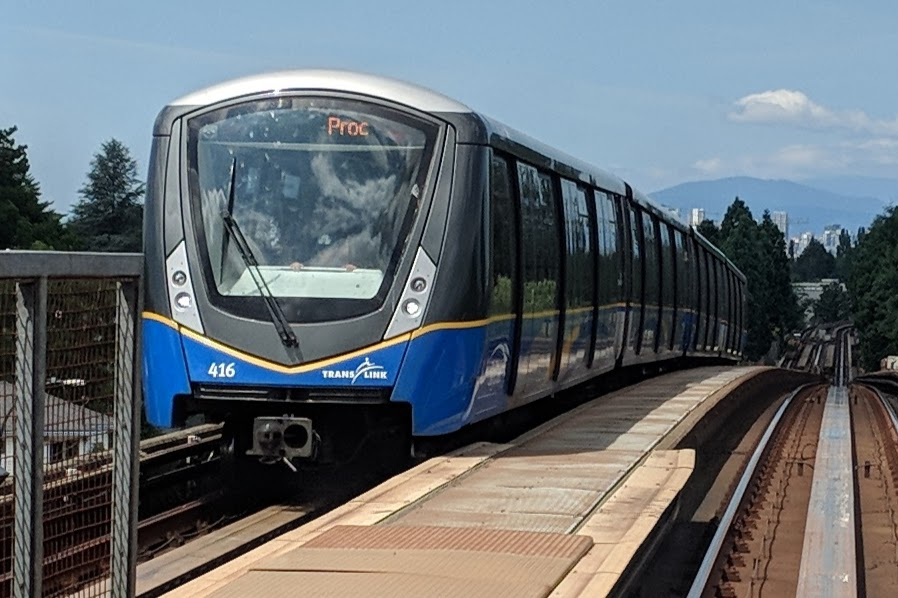
- Innovia Metro Mark III train
- In service: Expo & Millennium Lines: Mark I: 1985–present (116); Mark II: 2002–present (108); Mark III: 2016–present (84); Mark V: since 2025 (40); Canada Line: EMU: 2009–present (64)
- Manufacturers: UTDC (Mark I); Bombardier (Mark II/III); Alstom (Mark V); Hyundai Rotem (EMU)
- Number under construction: 180 cars
- Number built: 461 cars
- Number in service: 412 cars
- Number retired: Mark I: 34 cars
- Formation: 6 cars per trainset (Mark I); 4 cars per trainset (Mark II/III); 5 cars per trainset (Mark V); 2 cars per trainset (EMU/Mark II)
- Operators: British Columbia Rapid Transit Company (Expo & Millennium Lines); ProTrans BC (Canada Line)
- Depots: Expo & Millennium Lines: SkyTrain Operation and Maintenance Centre (1985–present); Coquitlam Maintenance Centre (2016–present); Canada Line: Canada Line Operation and Maintenance Centre (2009–present)

Specifications
- Maximum speed: 80 km/h (50 mph)
- Traction system: UTDC ICTS Mark I: UTDC GTO–VVVF; Bombardier ART Mark II; Batch 1: Toshiba linear IGBT–VVVF; Batches 2–3: Bombardier MITRAC IGBT–VVVF; Bombardier Innovia Metro Mark III: Bombardier MITRAC IGBT-VVVF; Alstom Innovia Metro Mark V: Bombardier MITRAC IGBT-VVVF; Hyundai Rotem EMU: Mitsubishi IGBT-VVVF
- Traction motors: UTDC ICTS, Bombardier ART, Innovia Metro: 3-phase AC linear induction motor; Hyundai Rotem EMU: conventional 3-phase AC induction motor
- Electric systems: 650 V DC fourth rail linear induction (Expo & Millennium Lines); 750 V DC third rail conventional traction (Canada Line)
- Track gauge: 1,435 mm (4 ft 8 1/2 in) standard gauge

The SkyTrain is a rapid transit system located in the Metro Vancouver region of the Canadian province of British Columbia, with a number of different models of rolling stock.

== Summary ==
Summary of SkyTrain fleet
Builder	Model	Year acquired	Quantity	Fleet numbers
Urban Transportation Development Corporation	ICTS Mark I	1984–1986	114 cars	001–056; 061–118
Urban Transportation Development Corporation	ICTS Mark I	1990–1991	16 cars	121–136
Urban Transportation Development Corporation	ICTS Mark I	1994–1995	20 cars	137–156
Bombardier Transportation	ART Mark II	2000–2002	60 cars	201–260
Bombardier Transportation	ART Mark II	2009	34 cars	301–334
Bombardier Transportation	ART Mark II	2010	14 cars	335–348
Bombardier Transportation	Innovia Metro Mark III	2016	28 cars	401–428
Bombardier Transportation	Innovia Metro Mark III	2018–2020	56 cars	429–484
Alstom	Innovia Metro Mark V	2025–present	235 cars	6011–
Hyundai Rotem	EMU	2009	40 cars	101–120; 201–220
Hyundai Rotem	EMU	2019–2020	24 cars	121–132; 221–232

Standard SkyTrain train configuration and capacity
Model	Length/car	Seats/car	Capacity/car	Cars/train	Length/train	Capacity/train
ICTS Mark I (1984–1995)	12.7 m (41 ft 8 in)	22–36	~80	4 cars	50.8 m (166 ft 8 in)	332
ICTS Mark I (1984–1995)	12.7 m (41 ft 8 in)	22–36	~80	6 cars	76.2 m (250 ft 0 in)	498
ART Mark II (2000–2002)	17.35 m (56 ft 11 1/8 in)	42	123	2 cars	34.7 m (113 ft 10 1/8 in)	256
ART Mark II (2000–2002)	17.35 m (56 ft 11 1/8 in)	42	123	4 cars	69.4 m (227 ft 8 1/4 in)	512
ART Mark II (2nd generation; 2009/2010)	17.35 m (56 ft 11 1/8 in)	33	130	2 cars	34.7 m (113 ft 10 1/8 in)	264
ART Mark II (2nd generation; 2009/2010)	17.35 m (56 ft 11 1/8 in)	33	130	4 cars	69.4 m (227 ft 8 1/4 in)	528
Innovia Metro Mark III (2016–2019)	17.025 m (55 ft 10 1/4 in)	30–33	131–135	4 cars	68.1 m (223 ft 5 1/8 in)	532
Innovia Metro Mark V (2025–present)	17.025 m (55 ft 10 1/4 in)	31	134-139	5 cars	84.8 m (278 ft 2 5/8 in)	672
Hyundai Rotem EMU (2009–present)	20.5 m (67 ft 3 1/8 in)	44	167	2 cars	41 m (134 ft 6 1/8 in)	334

== Expo Line and Millennium Line fleets ==
The Expo Line and Millennium Line Bombardier Advanced Rapid Transit (ART) technology is a system of automated trains driven by linear induction motors, formerly known as the Intermediate Capacity Transit System (ICTS). These trains reach speeds of 80 kilometres per hour (50 mph); including wait times at stops, the end-to-end average speed is 45 kilometres per hour (28 mph), three times faster than a bus and almost twice as fast as a B-Line express bus.

=== UTDC ICTS Mark I ===
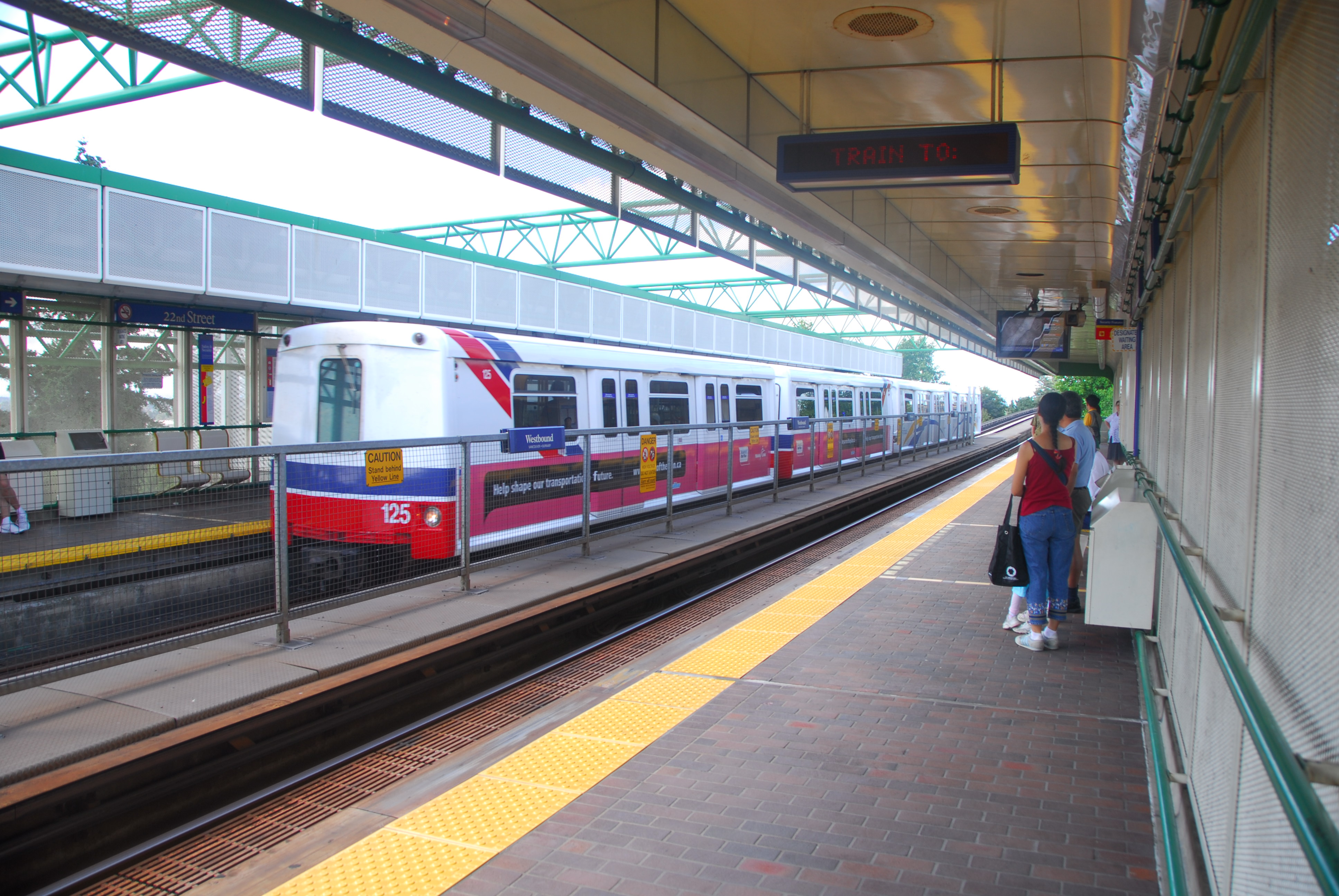
Mark I SkyTrain at 22nd Street station

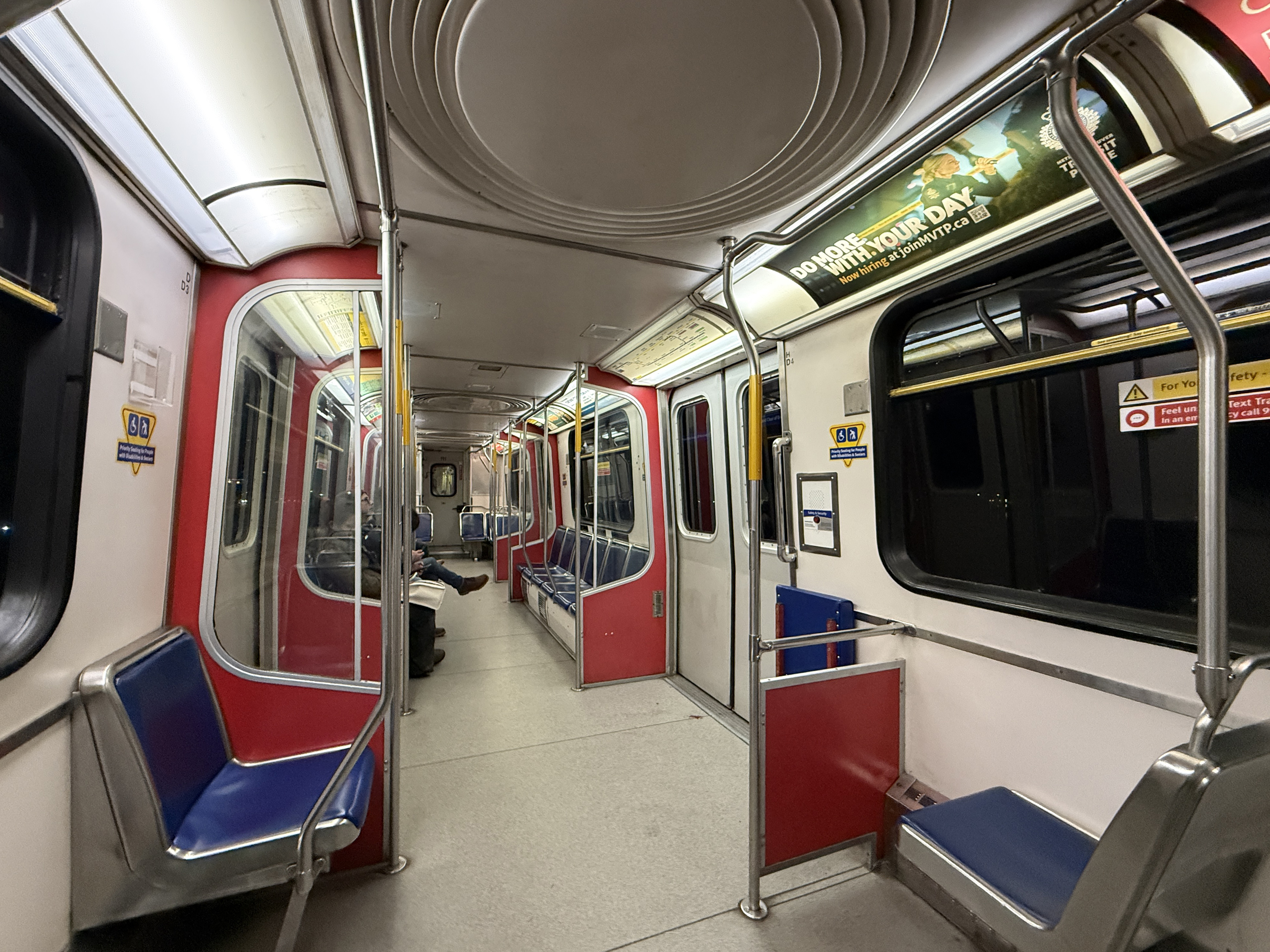
The interior of an older Mark I train

The original fleet consists of 12 metres (39 ft) lightweight Mark I ICTS cars from Urban Transportation Development Corporation, similar to those used by Line 3 Scarborough in Toronto (until its closure in July 2023) and the Detroit People Mover. Mark I vehicles are composed of mated pairs and normally run as six-car trains, but can also be run in two- and four-car configurations. The maximum based on station platform lengths is a six-car configuration, totaling 72 metres (236 ft) The SkyTrain fleet currently includes 150 Mark I trains. These trains have side-facing seats; red, white, and blue interiors; and two doors per car. However, some repainted units feature only blue and white interiors.

Each Mark I car has 36 seats and a capacity of 80 passengers. Mark I trains have spaces dedicated for wheelchair users, bicycles, and strollers.

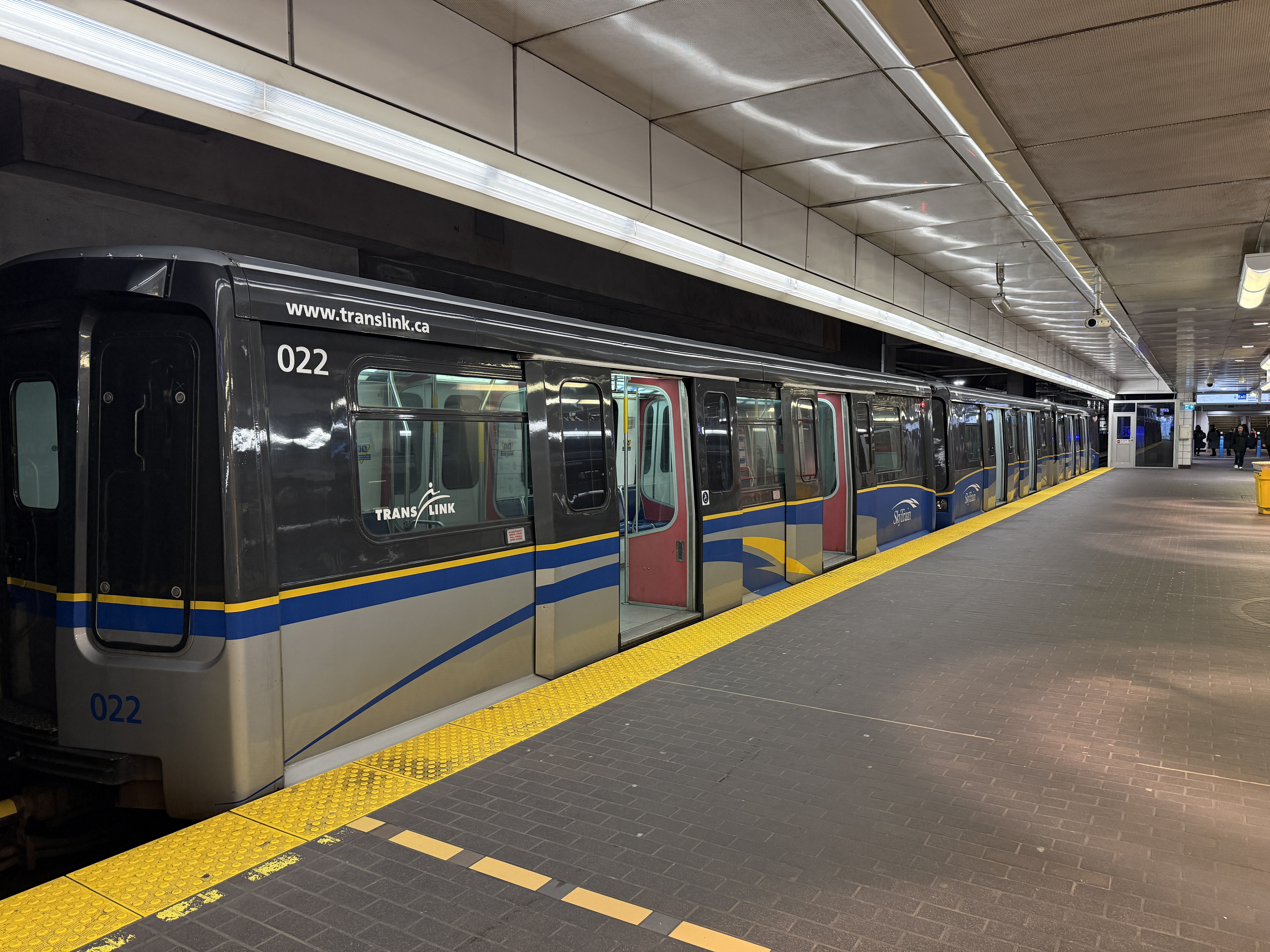
Repainted Mark I in new livery

The Mark I ICTS cars built between 1984 and 1986 for the first phase of the Expo Line featured two end-doors, one at the front and back of each car. The back side of each car had sections painted in black. These trains were different from the test train couple used during the ICTS testing in 1983. There are a total of 150 Mark I cars: 114 dating from 1984–1986, which have run an average of more than 3.2 million km apiece; 16 added in 1991 for the Scott Road extension; and 20 added in 1994 for the King George extension.

In 1991, additional Mark I ICTS cars were purchased. These newer cars featured no end doors, and the back side was not coloured black. The ends of each car had no doors; instead, the windows were slightly enlarged and the front was equipped with an electric motor driven windshield wiper. Trains include a fold-down seat near the front ends that permit a rider a view of the tracks from the end car.

When the 1984/86 fleet of ICTS cars were introduced, floors were carpet-lined, intended as a way to showcase SkyTrain as an elegant world class system. However, as maintaining the carpets proved difficult and sanitation issues quickly became a concern, they were replaced with wax flooring in mid-1992. The Expo fleet of trains also initially equipped with passenger-initiated door buttons, meaning that individual door sets only opened at the push of a button when passengers wished to get on or off at a particular station. The buttons were removed between 1989 and 1991, due in large part to passenger confusion as to how to properly use the buttons as well as doors jamming, thus leading to the issue of frequent system-wide or area-specific delays.

Between the late 1990s and early 2000s, just prior to the opening of the Millennium Line, SkyTrain gradually refurbished the entire Mark I train fleet in terms of design and layout. This included minor and major paint scheme changes before and following the shift from BC Transit to TransLink, upgrading of signage, changes to seating fabric colour scheme and seating arrangement, and a complete re-recording of the station announcement system that had been in use since 1985.

From the beginning of the system's revenue opening in January 1986, SkyTrain operated daytime service with two-car and four-car Mark I trains running at a target five-minute frequency. During Expo 86, four-car trains were primarily used to manage the large-scale population flow of the fair. In the years following, two-car trains were operated on off-peak hours, late evenings and Sundays, while four-car trains were used to handle peak periods and large downtown events such as concerts, marathons, and hockey games. Two-car trains were gradually phased out between 1990 and 1993 in response to complaints about overcrowding. At the opening of the second part of the phase two extension to Scott Road station in 1990, six-car trains were used for the first time at reduced frequency while an operation glitch in the system's computer network had to be corrected and re-programmed.

Prior to the opening of the Millennium Line, four-car trains became standard because SkyTrain could operate frequent service (about 150 seconds) during peak hours. The opening of GM Place (today called Rogers Arena) also brought an increase in the number of special events (hockey, concerts, and the short-lived trial of basketball) which required extended capacity during the evenings. Two-car trains only operate during train maintenance and testing at the BCRTC Edmonds Maintenance and Storage Facility in Burnaby.

In 2013, the oldest 114 Mark I cars began being refurbished to extend their intended lifespan another fifteen years, from 2011 to 2026. The refurbishment included an interior and exterior repainting (in the current blue–grey TransLink livery), removal of seats to increase capacity, and the replacement of various systems. As of July 2017, these original cars were all repainted, but not all refurbished. The project, which would ultimately see all Mark I cars updated, was expected to be finished in April 2020.

As of October 22, 2016, leading up to the opening of the Evergreen Extension on December 2, Mark I trains no longer mainly operate as four-car trains; they commonly operate in a six-car configuration (though four-car formations do occasionally appear should there be additional cars in maintenance).

In 2024, TransLink made progress on the retirement of the Mark I fleet beginning with the decommissioning of six cars in December of that year. By October 2025, approximately 20 Mark I cars had been removed from the fleet, and as of April 2026, that number had grown to 34 Mark I cars retired. All Mark I cars are expected to be retired by 2027.

=== Bombardier ART Mark II ===
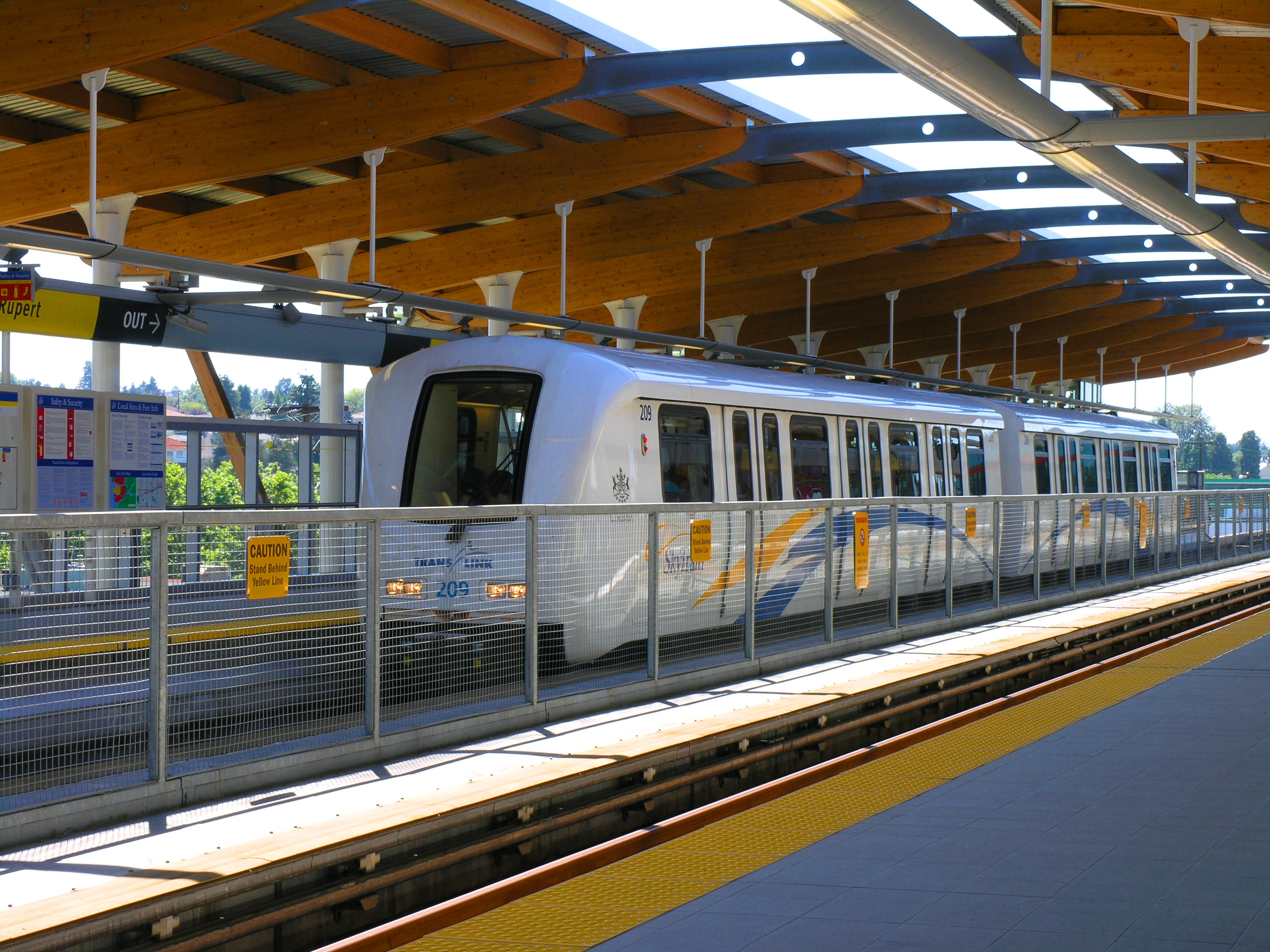
Exterior of a first-generation Mark II train

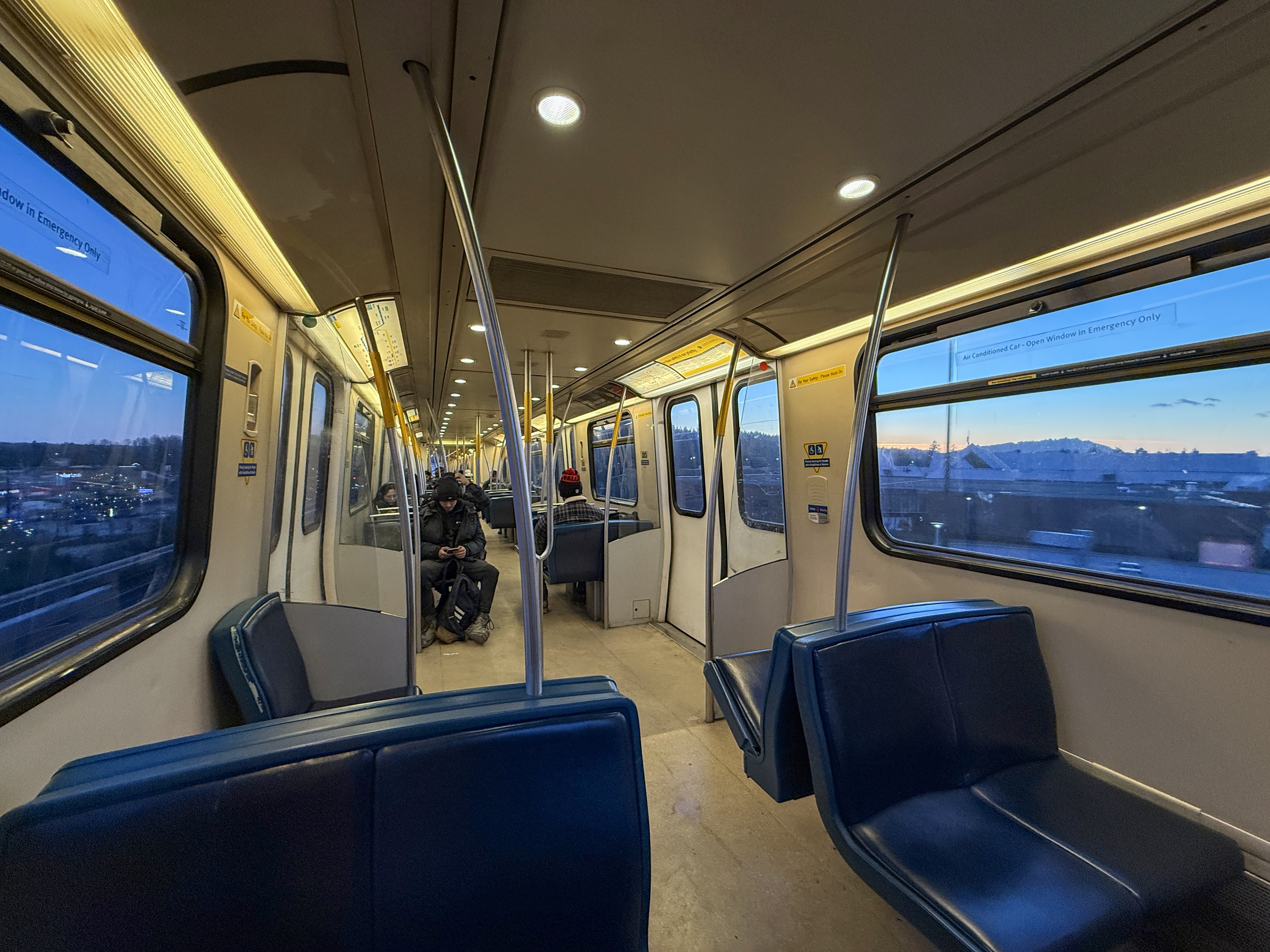
First-generation Mark II trains have more spacious interiors than Mark I trains, which allow them to carry more riders in trains of the same size.

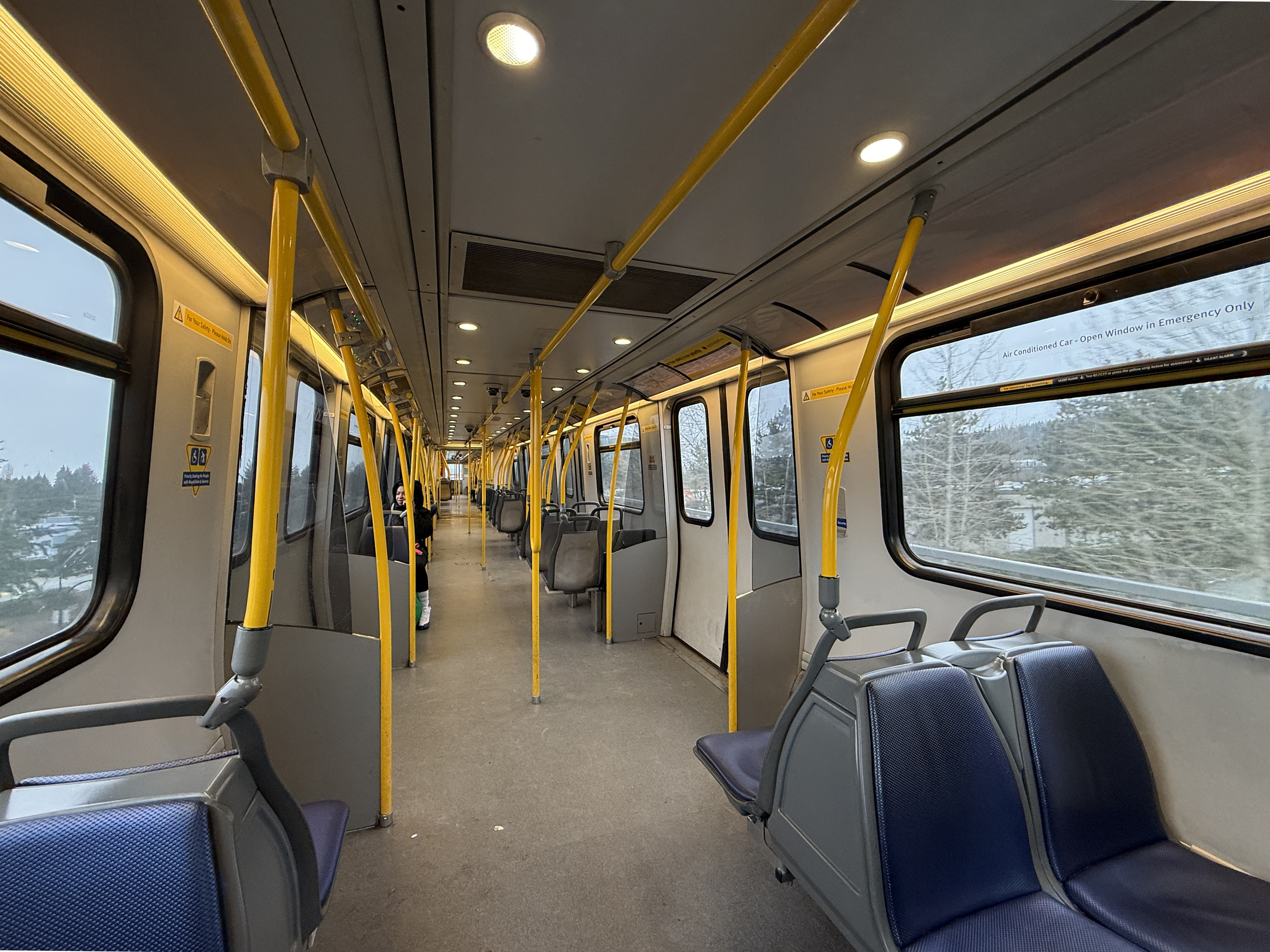
Second-generation Mark II trains have a row of seats removed to allow for greater capacity than first-generation Mark IIs.

When the Millennium Line was built, TransLink ordered new-generation Mark II ART trains from Bombardier Transportation, 50 of which were manufactured in a Burnaby factory. Similar trains are used in Kuala Lumpur's Kelana Jaya Line, New York's JFK AirTrain, and the Beijing Airport Express. These trains are usually seen in two-car and four-car configurations. Each pair of cars is permanently joined together in a twin unit or "married pair", with a length of 33.4 metres (109 ft 7 in). Mark II trains have a streamlined front and rear, an articulated joint allowing passengers to walk the length of a married pair, white/grey/blue interiors, and three doors per car.

Like Mark I trains, Mark II vehicles are fully accessible, with dedicated spaces for wheelchair users, strollers, and bicycles. The first-generation Mark II vehicles each have 41 seats and a capacity of 130 passengers, although trains have carried up to 150 passengers under crush load.

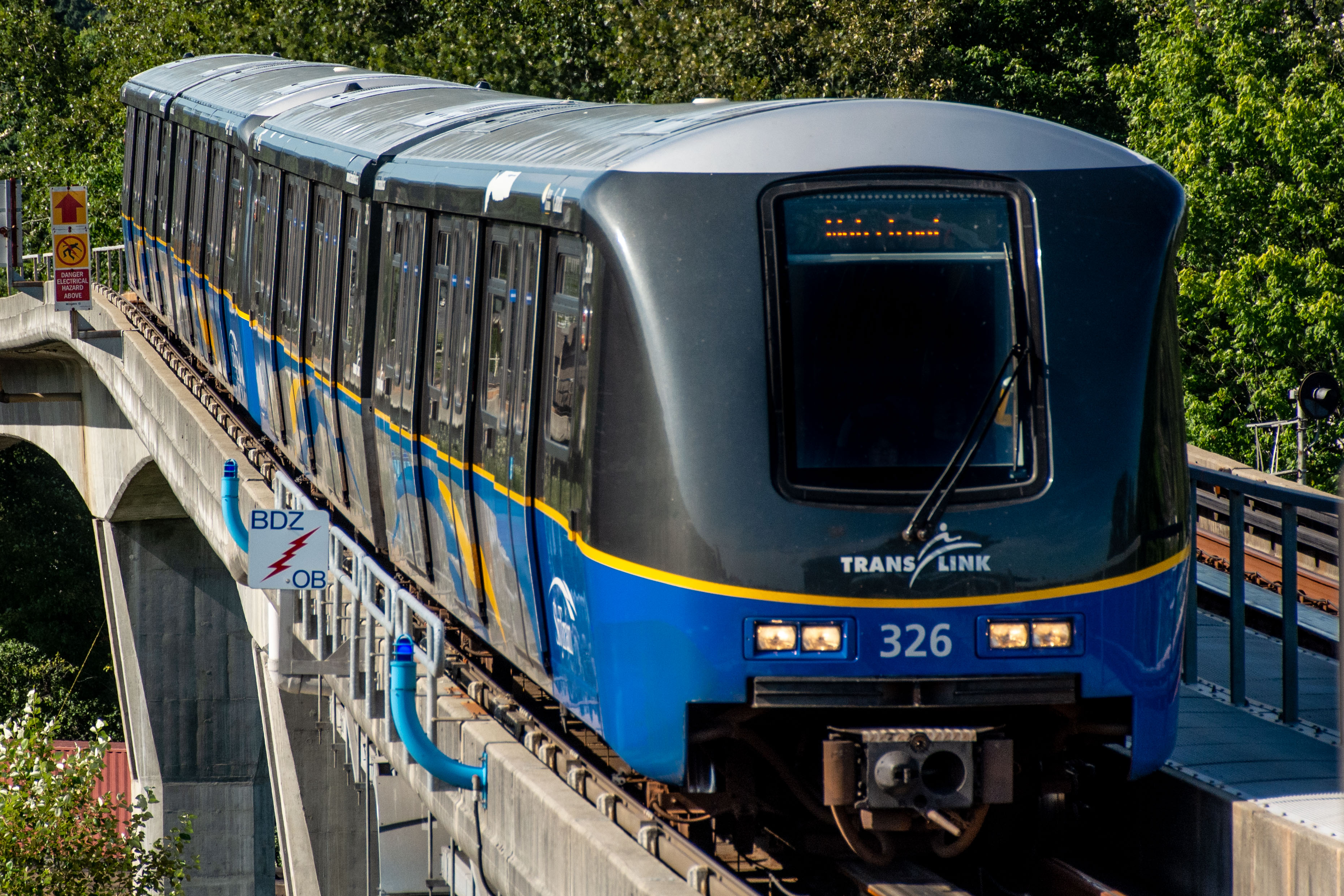
Second generation Mark II train

There were 60 Mark II cars added in 2002 for the Millennium Line and ridership growth on the Expo Line. In November 2006, Bombardier won a contract to supply a further 34 second-generation ART Mark II cars with a bid of $113 million. The second-generation Mark II vehicles have fewer seats and wider aisles than their first-generation counterparts, providing more space for standees, wheelchairs, strollers, and bicycles; they have 33 seats and a total capacity of 145 passengers. The second-generation Mark II trains also feature interactive LED maps, destination boards in the front and back windows of the train, more handlebars, door indicator lights, and video cameras. These cars were painted in the newer TransLink livery appearing on buses at the time. The trains were manufactured and assembled in Sahagun, Mexico, and Thunder Bay, Ontario. An additional 14 ART Mark II second-generation cars were ordered for delivery in early 2010. The first of these trains entered regular service on July 3, 2009.

=== Bombardier Innovia Metro 300 (ART Mark III) ===
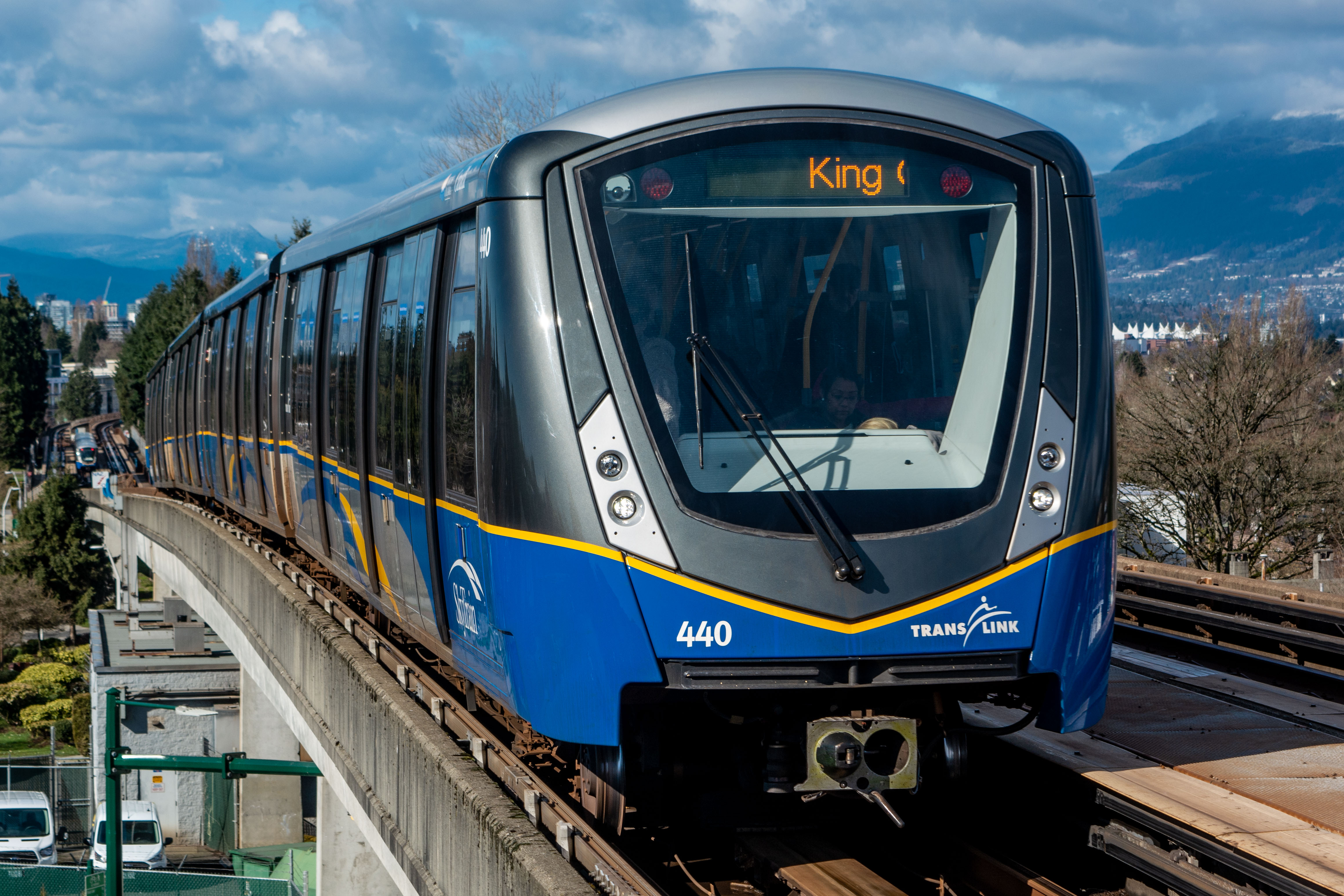
Four-car Bombardier Innovia Metro 300 (ART Mark III) train

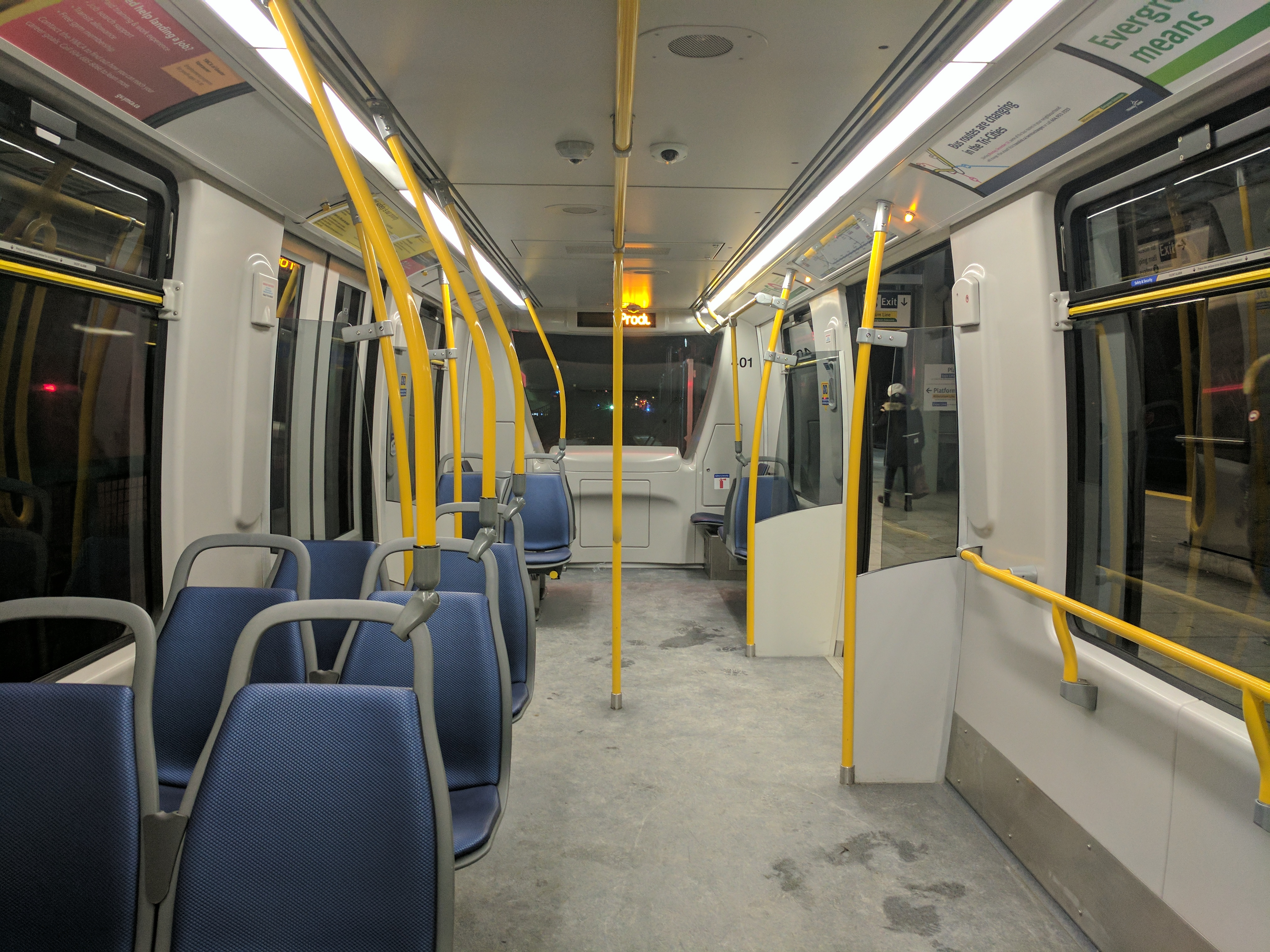
Interior of Mark III car looking toward the end. Notice one side with no seats and the larger windows.

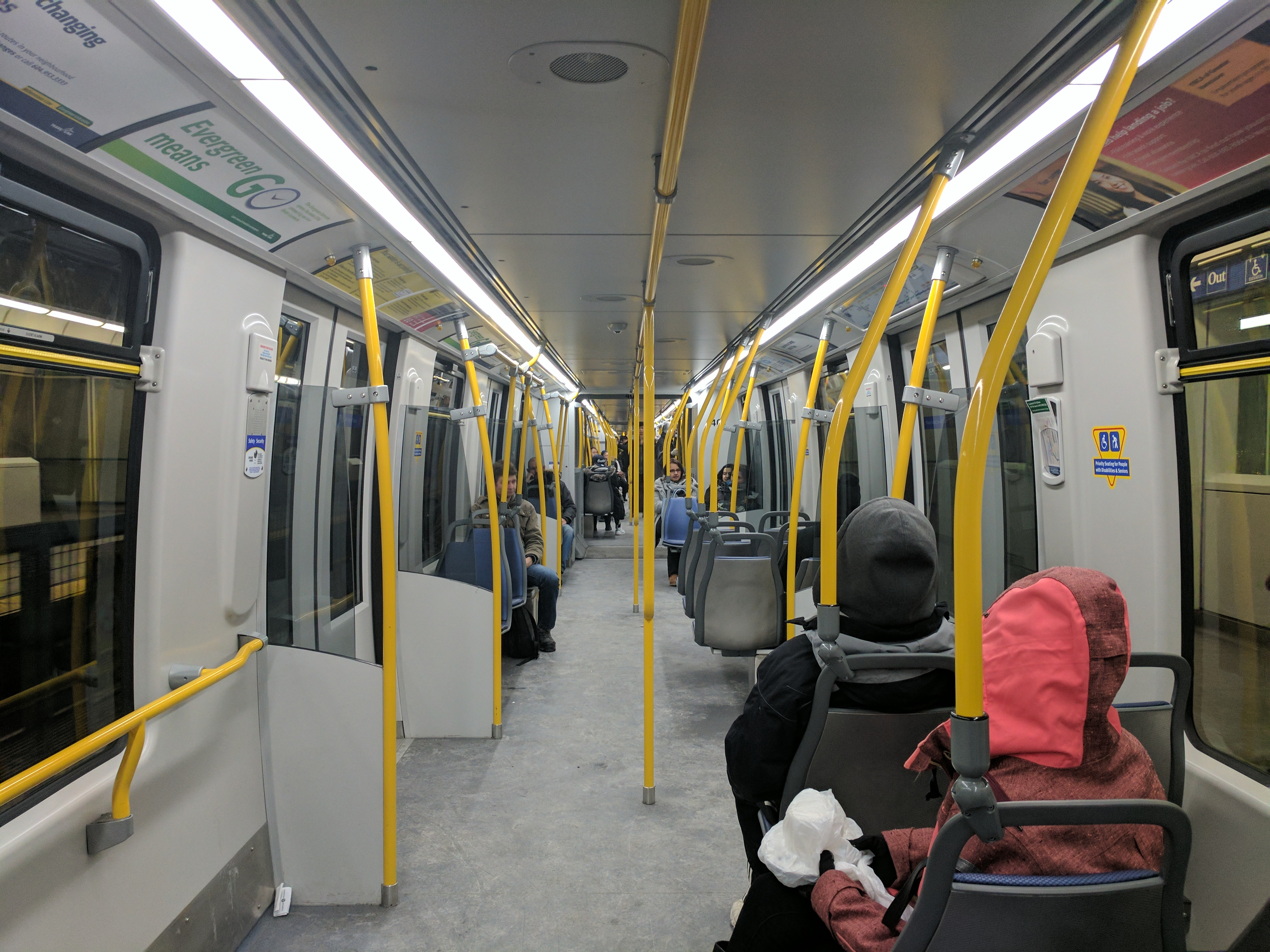
Interior of Mark III car looking toward the centre. Notice the walkway and gangway are even wider than the Mark II second generation.

When SkyTrain expanded operations by adding additional train capacity to existing lines (notably the busiest route, the Expo Line), as well as constructing new lines that use LIM rail for propulsion (such as the Evergreen Extension), TransLink placed further orders for Bombardier ART train cars. The construction for Evergreen Extension included the purchase of 28 new cars and an option (which was exercised on December 16, 2016) to order 28 additional cars to increase network capacity. As part of plans to gradually increase Expo Line capacity, eventual operation of five-car Mark II trains is anticipated to maximize usage of the current 80-metre (260 ft) platform length. Extending platform length at existing Expo Line stations was not under consideration as of 2010.

The Bombardier ART Mark III model, also known as Innovia Metro 300, is the newest iteration and redesign from the original UTDC ICTS model. Its dimensions are similar to the Mark II, with the vehicles appearing sleeker and having larger windows on both sides of the train, along with redesigned windows and headlights on the ends of the cars. Vehicle capacity was improved through redesigned interior layout, such as the removal of a section of seats. Also similar to the trains used on Canada Line, the Mark III cars have large LED displays on the ends of the exterior and interior of the train, displaying the terminus station on exterior signs, with interior displays showing next station, terminus station, and system announcement information.

The first Mark III vehicles of the initial 28-car order entered service on August 18, 2016, on the Expo Line. They were temporarily pulled from service pending further testing on September 26, 2016, when one of the trainsets lost power while crossing the SkyBridge a few days earlier. An additional 28 cars were ordered later that year and arrived beginning in 2018; that second 28-car order was later expanded to 56 cars in early 2018, all of which were delivered by 2019 as part of the 10-year vision plan, bringing the total of Mark III cars in service to 84.

==== Mark IV ====
In November 2021, it was revealed that TransLink was reserving the Mark IV designation in the event it upgraded select Mark III trains in the future.

=== Alstom Mark V ===
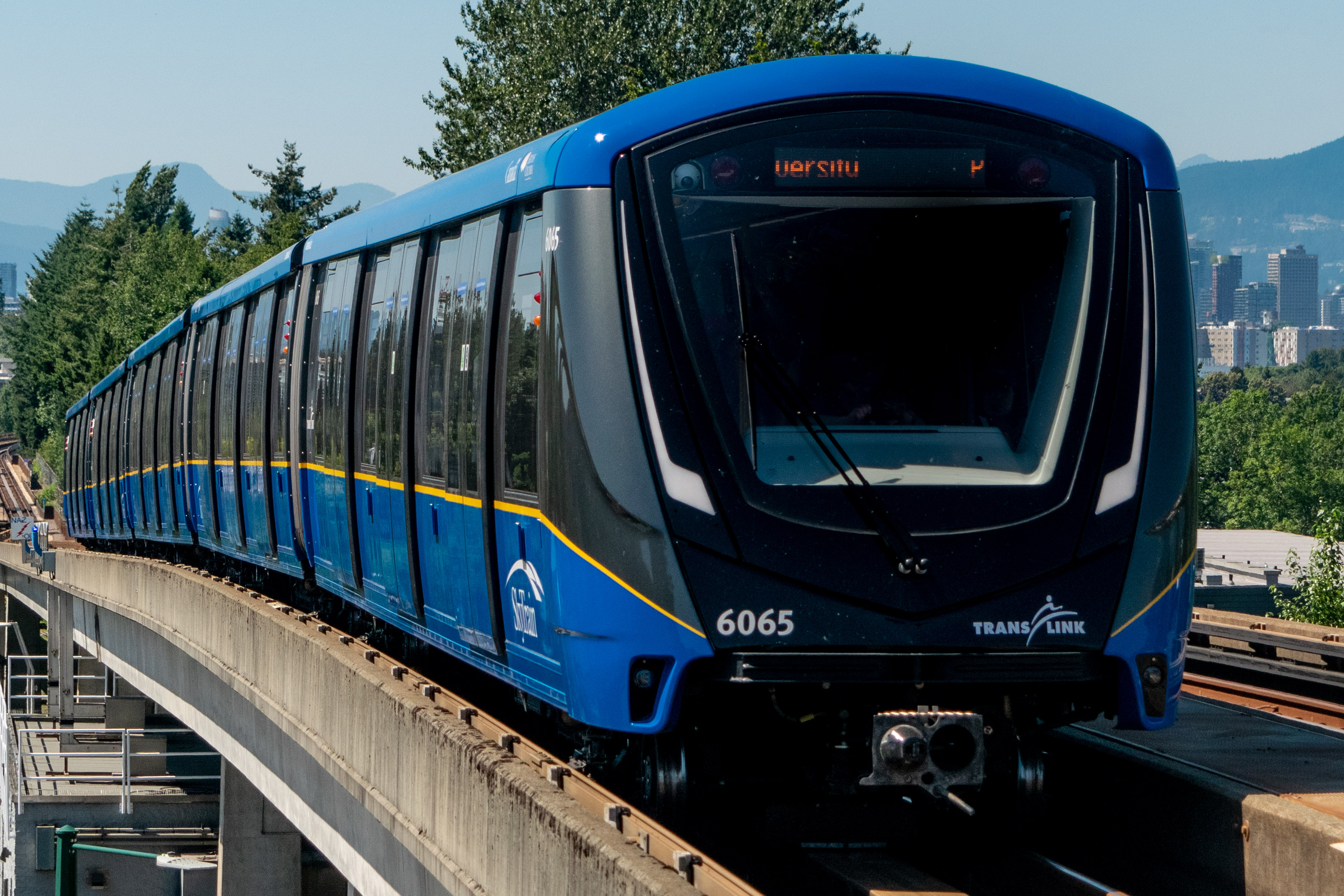
Five-car Alstom Mark V train

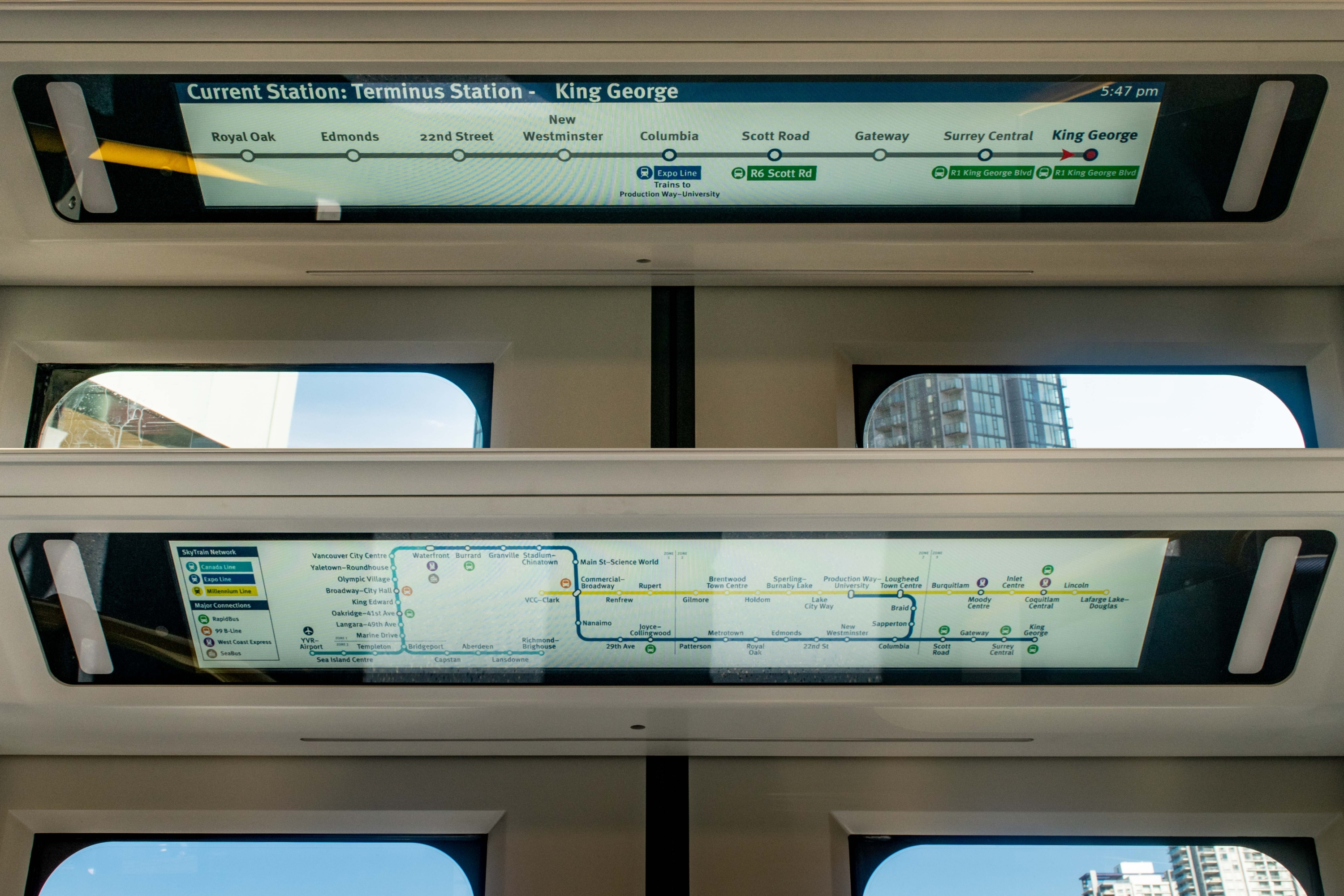
LCD screens are located above each door. Previous models featured LED maps.

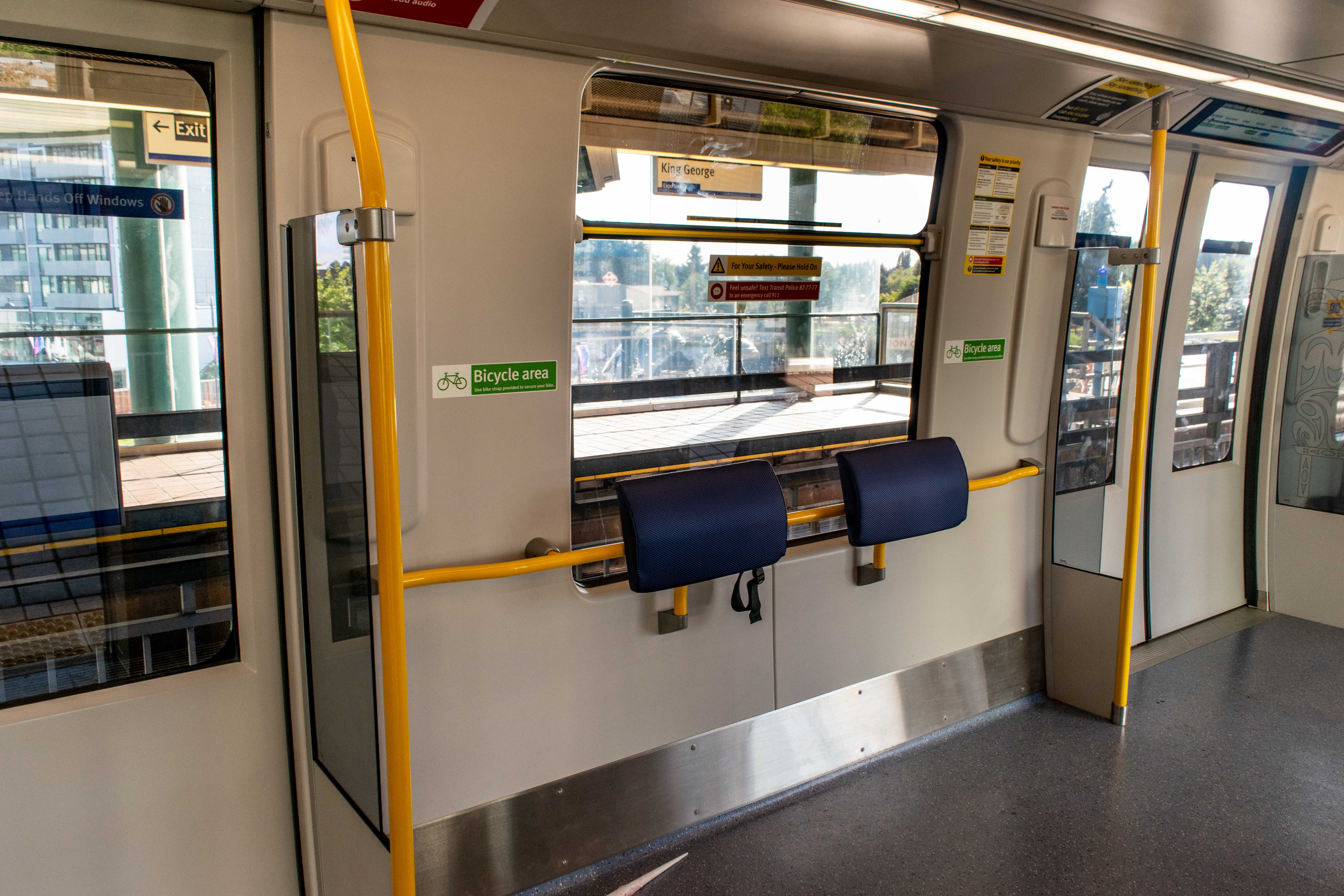
Revised multipurpose area featuring leaning pads and straps for bicycles

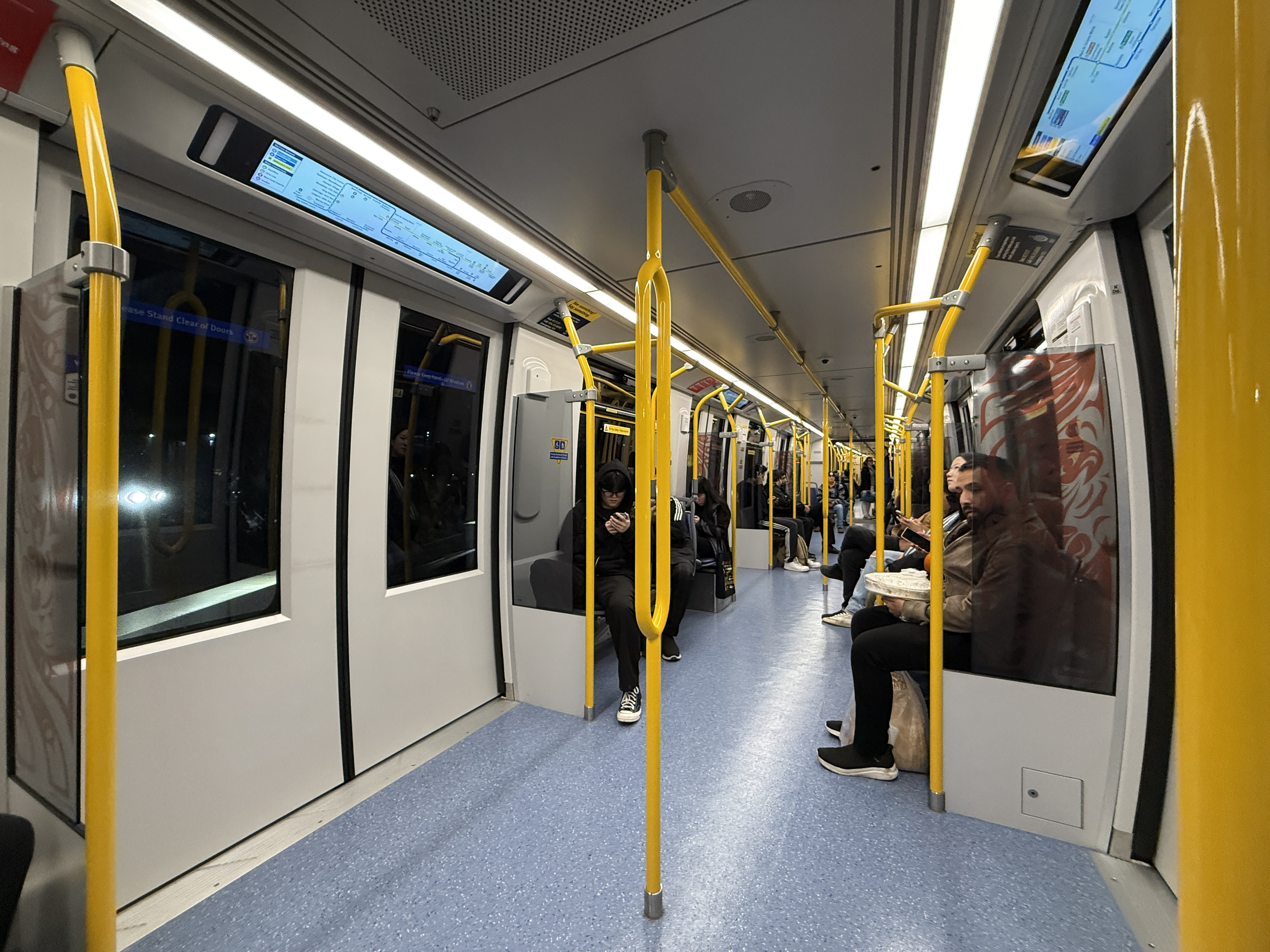
The interior of a Mark V train

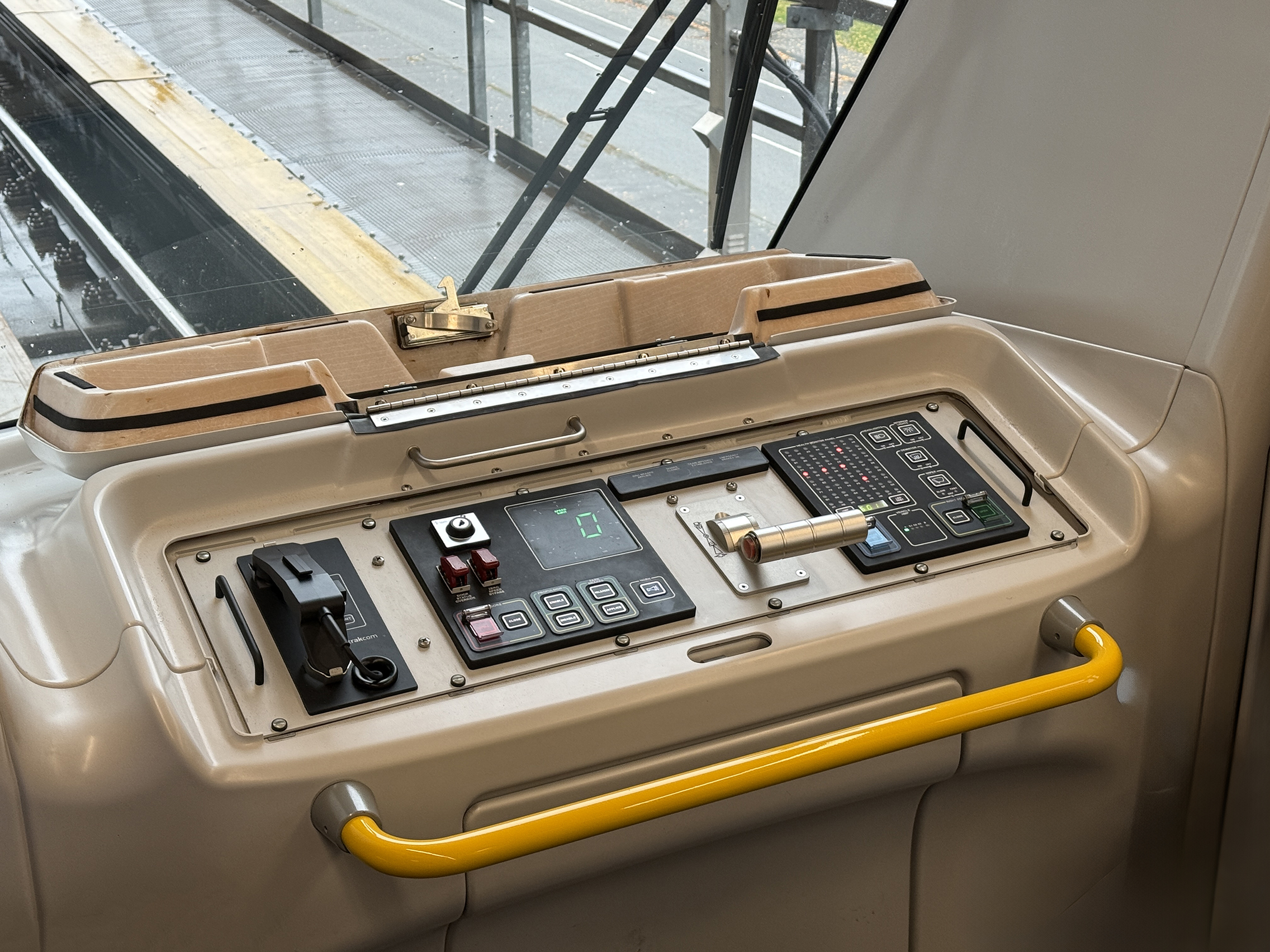
Control panel when open

In December 2020, TransLink announced the purchase of 205 SkyTrain cars from Bombardier at a cost of approximately $722 million. These trains are designated to replace the first-generation Mark I trains, to expand the fleet for the Broadway extension, and to improve capacity on the Expo and Millennium Lines. They will be formed as 41 five-car trains, a first on the SkyTrain network, as all trains up to this point currently have operated in two-, four-, or six-car configurations. The trains feature several improvements in contrast to the Mark III trains such as passenger Wi-Fi, information display screens, a new seating layout that increases capacity, bike racks, and an overall increase in reliability. Each five-car Mark V train will be able to carry 672 passengers regularly, both seated and standing, with a potential crush capacity of up to 1,207 passengers. The exterior design of the train features hockey stick shaped headlights, and interior windscreens of the train feature art by First Nations artists.

In November 2021, it was revealed that the new cars would carry the designation "Mark V". These would be the first SkyTrain vehicles made by French manufacturer Alstom after their acquisition of Bombardier Transportation in January 2021. It was also at this time that a mockup was sent to TransLink to aid in the design phase. In 2020, it was planned to have one train to arrive per month between June 2024 and September 2027. The order contains an option for the purchase of up to 400 additional cars to support future fleet expansion, replacement, and system extension projects.

Assembly for the first cars began in June 2022 at Alstom's Quebec manufacturing plant. Minor construction work was in progress in February 2023 at select Expo Line stations in order to prepare for the arrival of the first Mark V trains. The first Mark V train was assembled and was undergoing testing at Alstom's facility in Kingston, Ontario, in August 2023. The first train arrived in December 2023 for testing. In May 2024, Alstom announced that it would be manufacturing an additional 30 Mark V vehicles (six sets) at a cost of $68 million. With the addition of the six extra trains, the entire fleet of Mark V trains is set to be fully deployed by 2029. On March 8, 2025, TransLink began field testing of the trains. The first Mark V train entered regular service on July 11, 2025. As of April 2026, eight Mark V trains were in service while another three were undergoing testing.

=== Timeline ===
Mark I
Mark II
Mark III
Mark V
│
1985
│
1990
│
1995
│
2000
│
2005
│
2010
│
2015
│
2020
│
2025
Rolling stock transitions

== Canada Line fleet ==
=== Hyundai Rotem EMU ===
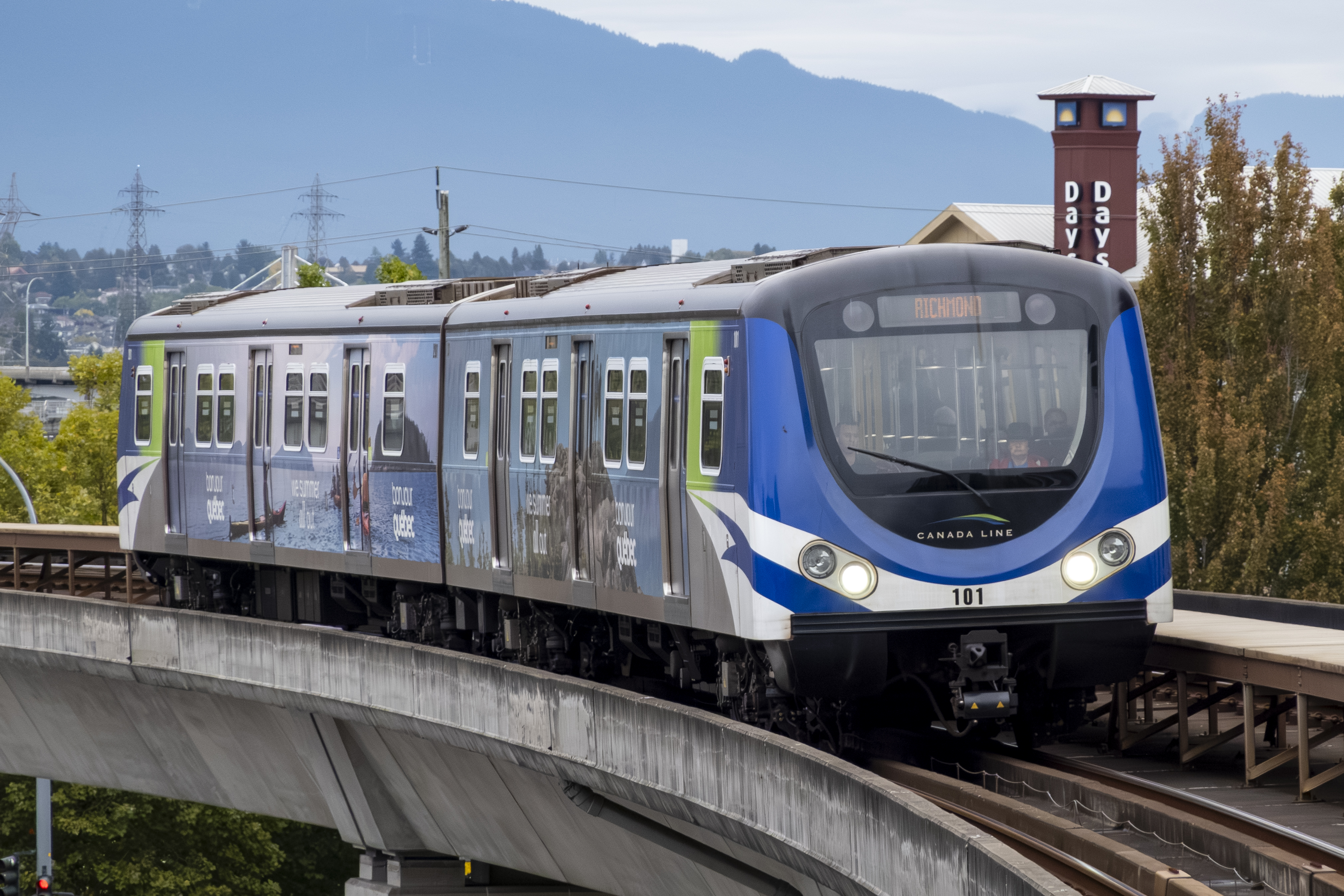
Exterior of a Canada Line train

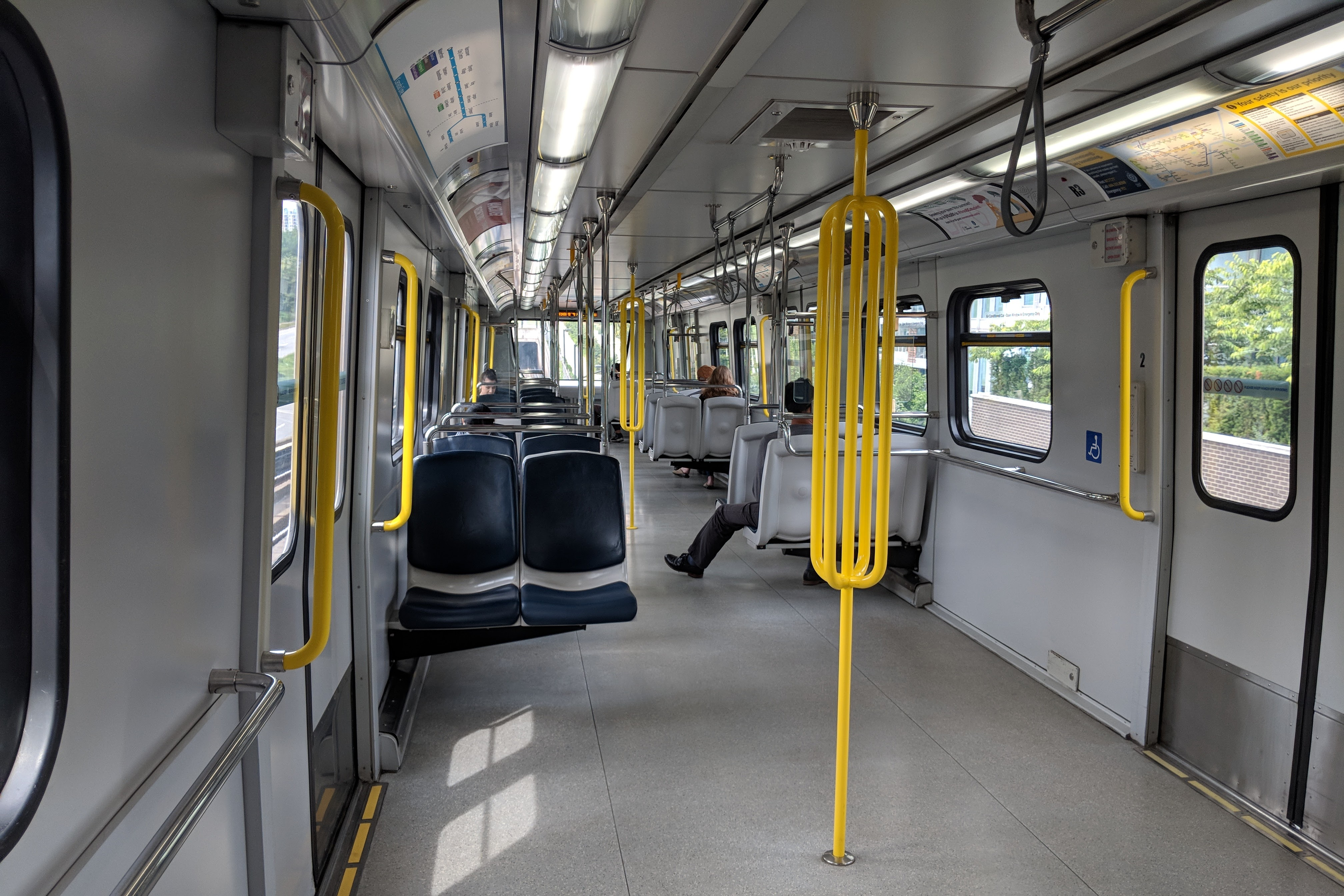
Canada Line's Hyundai Rotem trains are wider than Bombardier Mark II trains, with spaces assigned for bicycles and luggage.

The Canada Line's Hyundai Rotem cars use different train propulsion technology than Bombardier ART cars, being powered by conventional electric motors rather than linear induction motor (LIM) technology, and are therefore incompatible with the other SkyTrain lines. There are a total of 32 trainsets, which were built by Hyundai Rotem in Changwon, South Korea. The trains operate as two-carriage articulated units and can reach a speed of 80 kilometres per hour (50 mph) in normal operations, or 90 kilometres per hour (56 mph) in catch-up mode. The trains are operated by the same SelTrac automated train control system used in the rest of the SkyTrain network. They are maintained at a yard next to Bridgeport station in Richmond.

The Hyundai Rotem cars are 3 metres (9.8 ft) wide and 20 metres (66 ft) long, both wider and longer than the Bombardier Mark I, Mark II and Mark III cars. Each two-car train has seating for 88 and a normal capacity of 334 passengers at four passengers per square metre (0.37/sq ft), with crush load capacity of 400. A two-car Hyundai Rotem train has more capacity than a four-car Mark I train. The trains feature large, dedicated spaces for wheelchair users, bicycles, and strollers, and sufficient space between seats for luggage. The trains also have large LED displays on both ends of the exterior and interior of the train, displaying the terminus station on exterior signs, with interior displays showing next station, terminus station, and system announcement information.

The capacity of the line can be increased by 50 percent through an increase in frequency by adding more trains and another 50 percent through lengthening trains to a three-car configuration. An experiment in August 2016 saw two trains with 20 seats removed in each train in an attempt to increase passenger capacity. Unlike Bombardier ART trains, the Hyundai Rotem trains cannot be operated as longer four- or six-car trains. Through inserting a middle "C" car at the articulated joint between two end cars, the resultant capacity would be similar to a four-car Mark II or a six-car Mark I train. The Canada Line's station platforms are expandable to 50 metres (160 ft) in length to accommodate future three-car trains; the five busiest stations are already 50 metres (160 ft) in length. The Canada Line has a designed future capacity of 15,000 pphpd when operating three-car trains at two-minute headways.

When the line opened in 2009, the line was served by 20 trainsets, which were delivered from South Korea in 2007 and 2008. In 2018, 12 additional trainsets were ordered from Hyundai Rotem, at a cost of $88 million, to increase capacity on the line. These were delivered in 2019 and 2020.
