= Linear induction motor =

Type of linear motor

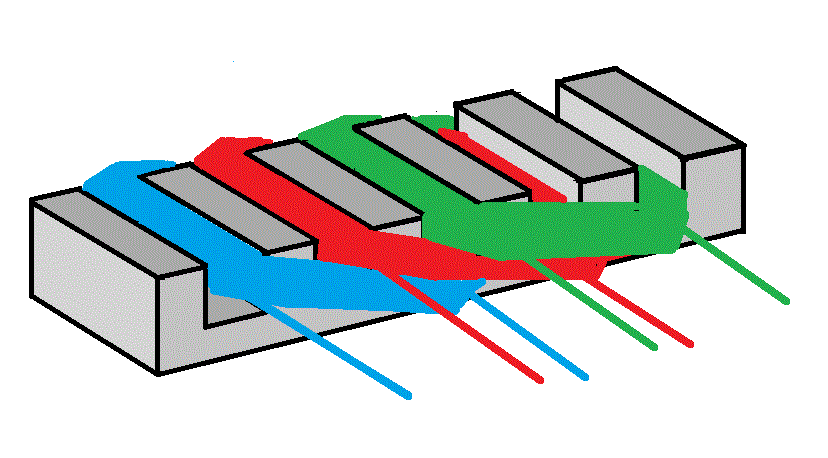
A typical 3 phase linear induction motor. The "primary" core (grey) has grooves, and the windings are laid into them on top of each other. An aluminium plate above (not shown) serves as "secondary" and will move relative to the primary if a 3 phase AC is applied.

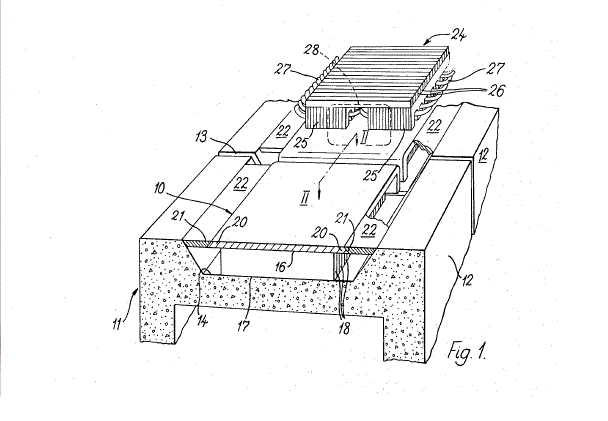
A transverse flux linear induction motor (here the primary is at top of picture) and has two sets of opposite poles side by side. (Picture from US Patent 3824414 by Eric Laithwaite)

A linear induction motor (LIM) is an alternating current (AC), asynchronous linear motor that works by the same general principles as other induction motors but is typically designed to directly produce motion in a straight line. Characteristically, linear induction motors have a finite primary or secondary length, which generates end-effects, whereas a conventional induction motor is arranged in an endless loop.

Despite their name, not all linear induction motors produce linear motion; some linear induction motors are employed for generating rotations of large diameters where the use of a continuous primary would be very expensive.

As with rotary motors, linear motors frequently run on a three-phase power supply and can support very high speeds. However, there are end-effects that reduce the motor's force, and it is often not possible to fit a gearbox to trade off force and speed. Linear induction motors are thus frequently less energy efficient than normal rotary motors for any given required force output.

LIMs, unlike their rotary counterparts, can give a levitation effect. They are therefore often used where contactless force is required, where low maintenance is desirable, or where the duty cycle is low. Their practical uses include magnetic levitation, linear propulsion (as a mass driver, and linear actuators. They have also been used for pumping liquid metals.

== History ==
The history of linear electric motors can be traced back at least as far as the 1840s to the work of Charles Wheatstone at King's College in London, but Wheatstone's model was too inefficient to be practical. A feasible linear induction motor is described in US patent 782312 (1905; inventor Alfred Zehden of Frankfurt-am-Main), and is for driving trains or lifts. German engineer Hermann Kemper built a working model in 1935. In the late 1940s, professor Eric Laithwaite of Imperial College in London developed the first full-size working model.

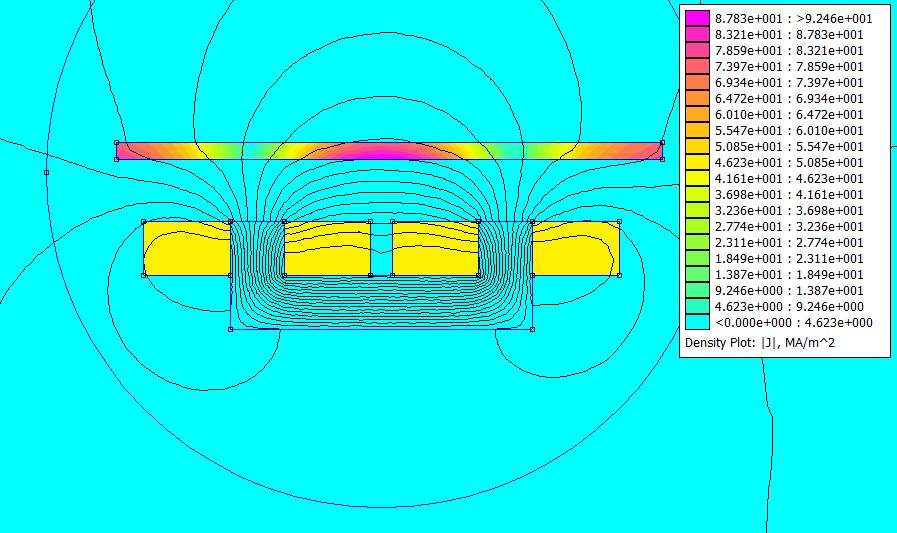
FEMM simulation of a Cross-section of Magnetic River, coloured by electric current density

In a single-sided version, the magnetic field can create repulsion forces that push the conductor away from the stator, levitating it and carrying it along the direction of the moving magnetic field. Laithwaite called the later versions a magnetic river. These versions of the linear induction motor use a principle called transverse flux where two opposite poles are placed side by side. This permits very long poles to be used, and thus permits high speed and efficiency.

== Construction ==
A linear induction motor's primary typically consists of a flat magnetic core (generally laminated) with transverse slots that are often straight cut with coils laid into the slots, with each phase giving an alternating polarity so that the different phases physically overlap.

The secondary is frequently a sheet of aluminium, often with an iron backing plate. Some LIMs are double sided with one primary on each side of the secondary, and, in this case, no iron backing is needed.

Two types of linear motor exist: a short primary, where the coils are truncated shorter than the secondary, and a short secondary, where the conductive plate is smaller. Short secondary LIMs are often wound as parallel connections between coils of the same phase, whereas short primaries are usually wound in series.

The primaries of transverse flux LIMs have a series of twin poles lying transversely side-by-side with opposite winding directions. These poles are typically made either with a suitably cut laminated backing plate or a series of transverse U-cores.

== Principles ==
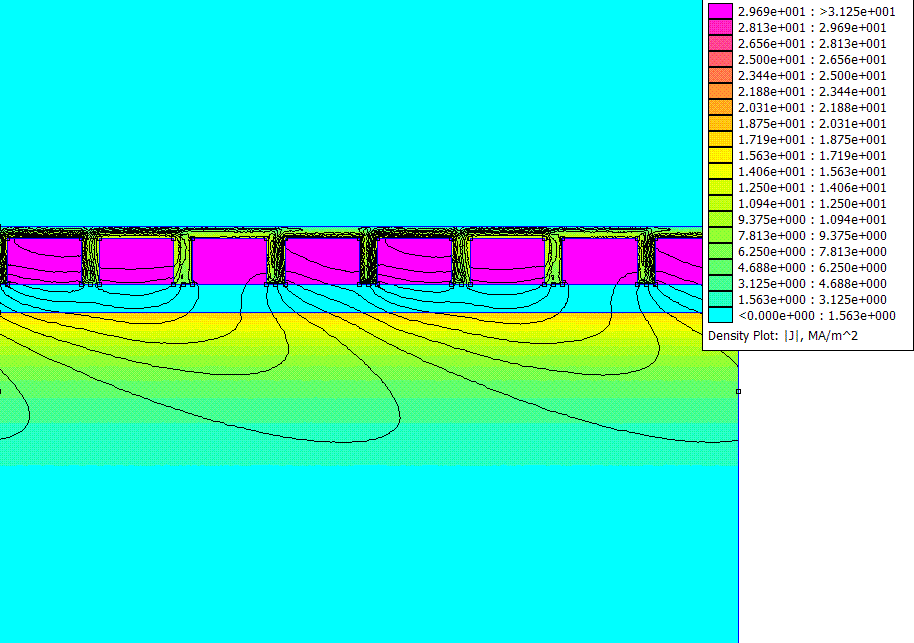
The magnetic field of a linear motor sweeping to the left, past an aluminium block. Coloured by induced electric current.

In this electric motor design, the force is produced by a linearly moving magnetic field acting on conductors in the field. Any conductor, be it a loop, a coil, or simply a piece of plate metal, that is placed in this field will have eddy currents induced in it thus creating an opposing magnetic field in accordance with Lenz's law. The two opposing fields will repel each other, creating motion as the magnetic field sweeps through the metal.

$n_s=2 f_s/p$

where f_{s} is supply frequency in Hz, p is the number of poles, and n_{s} is the synchronous speed of the magnetic field in revolutions per second.

The travelling field pattern has a velocity of:

$v_s=2 t f_s$

where v_{s} is velocity of the linear travelling field in m/s, and t is the pole pitch.

For a slip of s, the speed of the secondary in a linear motor is given by

$v_r=(1-s)v_s$

== Forces ==
=== Thrust ===
Thrust generated as a function of slip

The drive generated by linear induction motors is somewhat similar to conventional induction motors; the drive forces show a roughly similar characteristic shape relative to slip, albeit modulated by end effects.

Equations exist for calculating the thrust of a motor.

=== End effect ===
Unlike a circular induction motor, a linear induction motor shows 'end effects'. These end effects include losses in performance and efficiency that are believed to be caused by magnetic energy being carried away and lost at the end of the primary by the relative movement of the primary and secondary.

With a short secondary, the behaviour is almost identical to a rotary machine, provided it is at least two poles long but with a short primary reduction in thrust that occurs at low slip (below about 0.3) until it is eight poles or longer.

However, because of end effects, linear motors cannot 'run light' -- normal induction motors are able to run the motor with a near synchronous field under low load conditions. In contrast, end effects create much more significant losses with linear motors.

=== Levitation ===
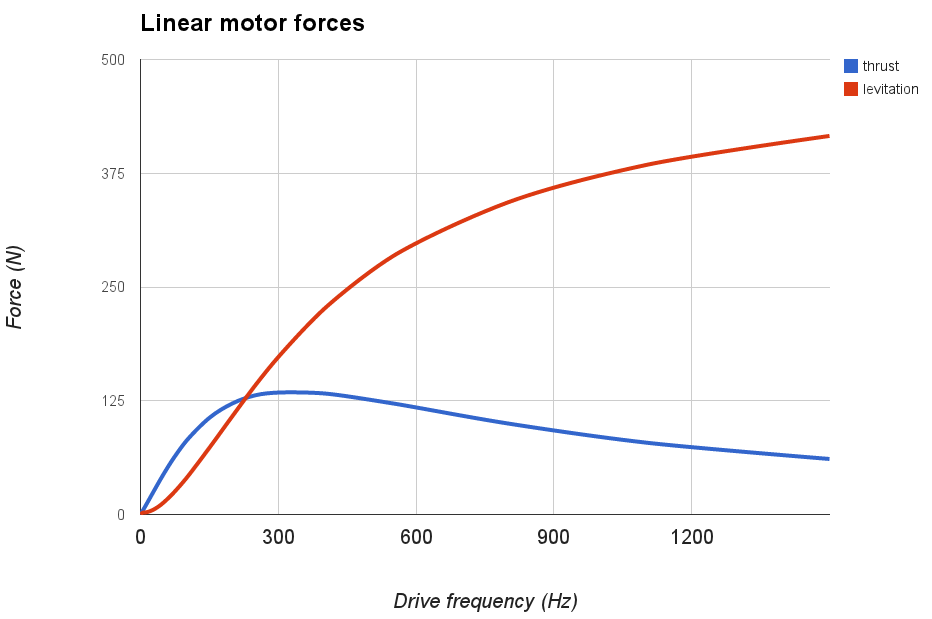
Levitation and thrust force curves of a linear motor

In addition, unlike a rotary motor, an electrodynamic levitation force is shown, this is zero at zero slip, and gives a roughly constant amount of force/gap as slip increases in either direction. This occurs in single sided motors, and levitation will not usually occur when an iron backing plate is used on the secondary, since this causes an attraction that overwhelms the lifting force.

== Performance ==
Linear induction motors are often less efficient than conventional rotary induction motors; the end effects and the relatively large air gap that is often present will typically reduce the forces produced for the same electrical power. Similarly, the efficiency during generator operation (electric braking/recuperating) with a linear induction motor was reported as relatively low due to end effects. The larger air gap also increases the inductance of the motor which can require larger and more expensive capacitors.

However, linear induction motors can avoid the need for gearboxes and similar drivetrains, and these have their own losses; and working knowledge of the importance of the goodness factor can minimise the effects of the larger air gap. In any case power use is not always the most important consideration. For example, in many cases linear induction motors have far fewer moving parts, and have very low maintenance. Also, using linear induction motors instead of rotating motors with rotary-to-linear transmissions in motion control systems, enables higher bandwidth and accuracy of the control system, because rotary-to-linear transmissions introduce backlash, static friction and/or mechanical compliance in the control system.

== Uses ==
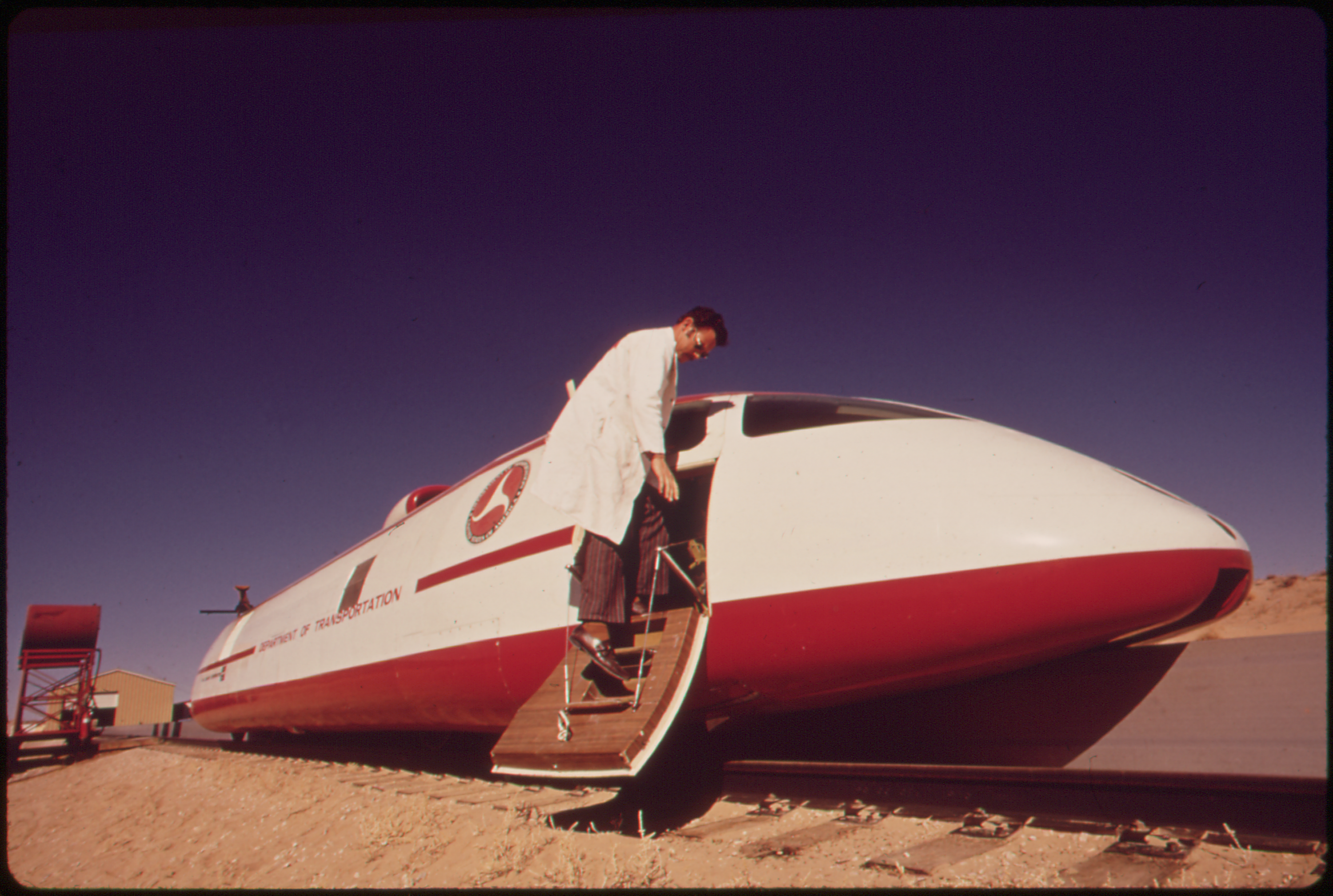
LIMTV Linear Induction Motor Test Vehicle in 1973

Because of these properties, linear motors are often used in maglev propulsion, as in the Japanese Linimo magnetic levitation train line near Nagoya.

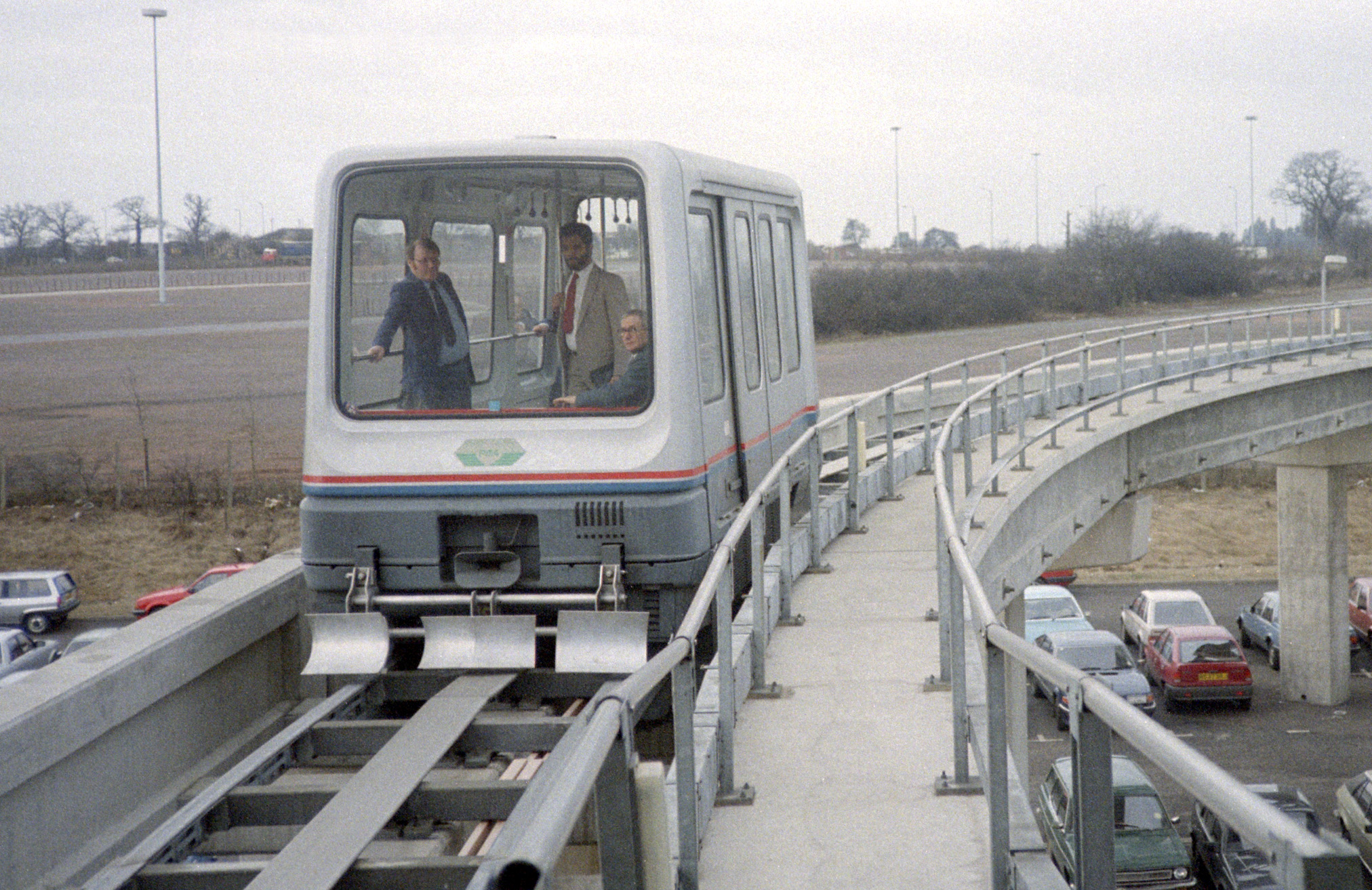
The Birmingham Airport Maglev shuttle

The world's first commercial automated maglev system was a low-speed maglev shuttle that ran from the airport terminal of Birmingham Airport to the nearby Birmingham International railway station between 1984–1995. The length of the track was 600 metres (2,000 ft), and trains "flew" at an altitude of 15 millimetres (0.59 in), levitated by electromagnets, and propelled with linear induction motors. It was in operation for nearly eleven years, but obsolescence problems with the electronic systems made it unreliable in its later years. One of the original cars is now on display at Railworld in Peterborough, together with the RTV31 hover train vehicle.

However, linear motors have been used independently of magnetic levitation, such as Tokyo's Toei Ōedo Line. The Bombardier Innovia Metro is an example of an automated system that utilizes LIM propulsion, most notably in Vancouver's SkyTrain system and Toronto's former Scarborough RT, both in Canada. The longest rapid transit system employing such technology is the Guangzhou Metro, with approximately 130 km (81 mi) of route using LIM propelled subway trains along Line 4, Line 5 and Line 6. They are also used by the Tomorrowland Transit Authority PeopleMover at Walt Disney World Resort in Bay Lake, Florida, and the Subway people mover at George Bush Intercontinental Airport in Houston, Texas, which uses the same design.

Linear induction motor technology is also used in some earlier launched roller coasters. The first coasters to use LIMs for propulsion were the identical Flight of Fear coasters at Kings Island and Kings Dominion, which both opened in 1996.

At present it is still impractical on street running trams, although this, in theory, could be done by burying it in a slotted conduit.

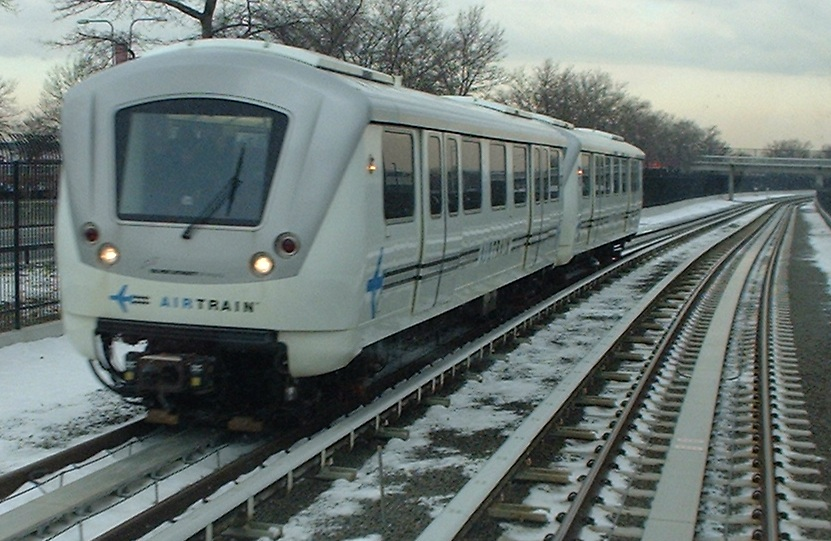
AirTrain JFK trains propel themselves using an aluminium induction strip placed between the rails.

Outside of public transportation, vertical linear motors have been proposed as lifting mechanisms in deep mines, and the use of linear motors is growing in motion control applications. They are also often used on sliding doors, such as those of low floor trams such as the Alstom Citadis and the Eurotram.

Dual axis linear motors also exist. These specialized devices have been used to provide direct X-Y motion for precision laser cutting of cloth and sheet metal, automated drafting, and cable forming. Also, linear induction motors with a cylindrical secondary have been used to provide simultaneous linear and rotating motion for mounting electronic devices on printed circuit boards.

Most linear motors in use are LIM (linear induction motors) or LSM (linear synchronous motors). Linear DC motors are not used as it includes more cost and linear SRM suffers from poor thrust. So for long run in traction LIM is mostly preferred and for short run LSM is mostly preferred.

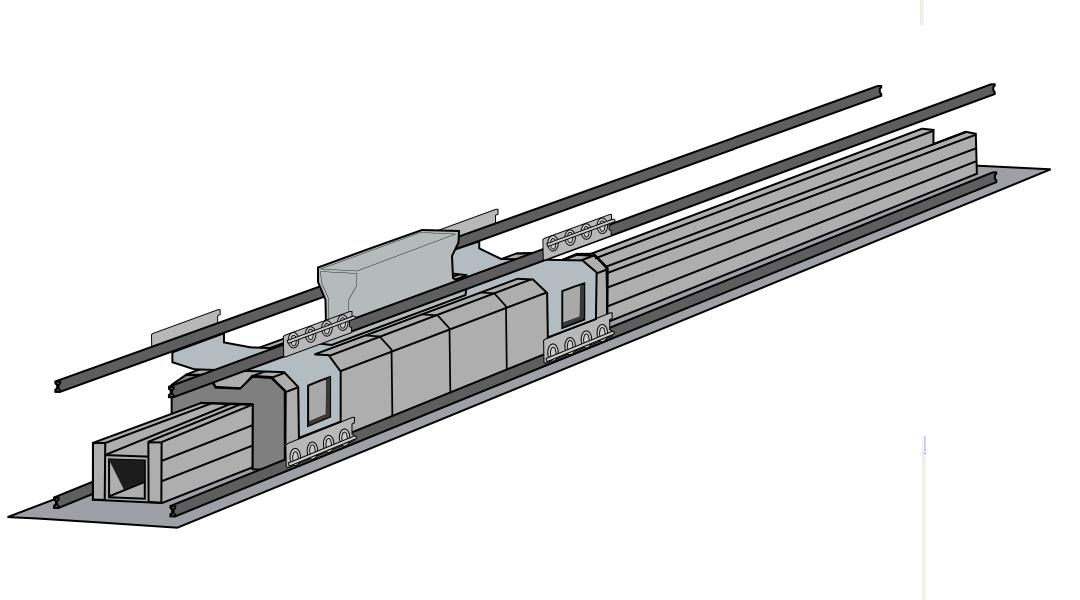
A diagram of EMALS' induction motor

Linear induction motors have also been used for launching aircraft, the Westinghouse Electropult system in 1945 was an early example and the Electromagnetic Aircraft Launch System (EMALS) was due to be delivered in 2010.

Linear induction motors are also used in looms, magnetic levitation enable bobbins to float between the fibers without direct contact.

The first ropeless elevator invented by ThyssenKrupp uses a linear induction drive power.

== See also ==
- Electromagnetic induction
- Goodness factor
- Maglev
- Tracked Hovercraft
- Linear Synchronous Motor
