= Margaret Kingsley =

Margaret Kingsley may refer to:

- Maggie Kingsley
- Margaret Kingsleigh, character in Alice in Wonderland
