= Magnetic river =

Magnetic river is an electrodynamic magnetic levitation (maglev) system designed by Fredrick Eastham and Eric Laithwaite in 1974. It consists of a thin conductive plate on an AC linear induction motor. Due to the transverse flux and the geometry, this gives it lift, stability and propulsion. The name refers to the action that provides stability along the longitudinal axis, which acts similar to the flow of water in a river.

== Linear motors ==
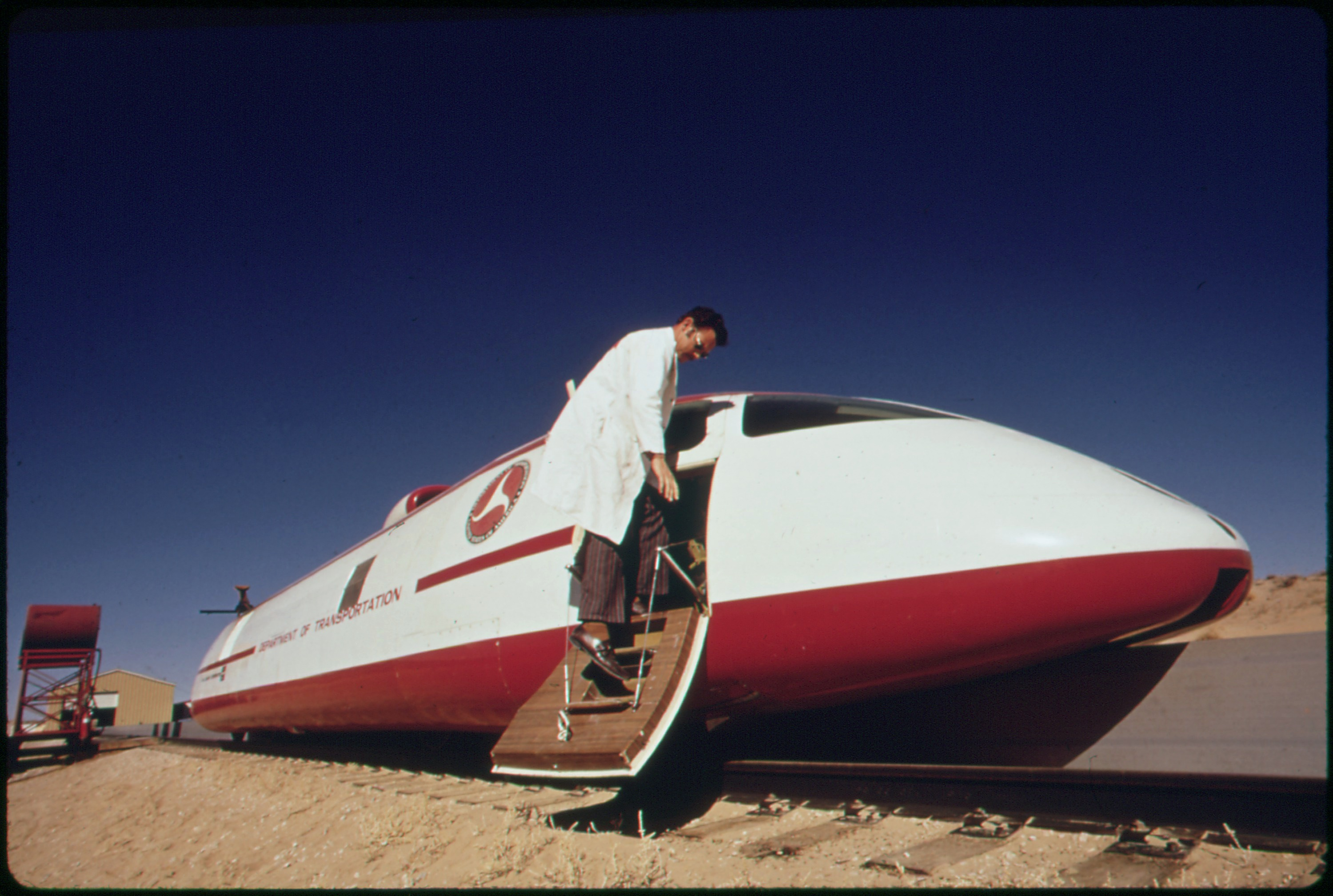
The US DoT's LIMTV is typical of the "sandwich motor" designs.

A linear induction motor (LIM) is essentially a conventional induction motor with its primary "unwound" and laid out flat. The rotor, normally consisting of a series of conductors wound onto a form of some sort, is replaced by a sheet of magnetically susceptible metal. Due to its good conductance to weight ratio, aluminium is almost always used for this "stator plate". When the primaries are fed current, they induce a magnetic field in the stator plate, which generates forces away from the plate and along it.

The simplest way to use these forces to produce linear motion is to arrange two such motors on either side of a single stator plate. That way the lift forces from one motor are opposite of the other, and clamping the two motors together results in there being no net sideways force (it is contained in the stress of the clamp). This is normally arranged in a C-shaped device which is hung above a vertical stator plate. Arrangements of this sort can be commonly seen on many pioneering transit systems from the 1960s, normally running through a slot in the middle of the vehicle floor.

By the late 1960s, a fatal flaw in this "sandwich motor" arrangement had been discovered. The stator plate cannot be made of a single casting, as it is kilometres long. Instead, it is made of many smaller plates that are then welded together. The strength of these welds is much smaller than the plate itself, and are prone to breaking in cold weather. When the vehicle passes, any misalignment between the motor and the stator results in enormous forces being generated, pushing the plate back into the center of the motor. These forces may be great enough to break the welds between the plates, or simply deform them. In this case, a motor on a following vehicle can strike the plate, catastrophically.

== Single-sided LIM ==
Looking to address the problems found in the sandwich motor, starting in 1967 Eric Laithwaite and his team at Imperial College London began experimenting with single-sided LIM arrangements. In this arrangement there is no corresponding set of magnetic fields on the "far side" of the stator, which requires some other system to be used to create a complete flux path.

The team initially considered small plates of soft iron, like those in a transformer core. The size of the flux arrangement, and thus the size of the iron plates required, was a function of vehicle speed, power frequency and the size of the magnets. The size of the magnets is a function of the power dissipation within them, and are therefore a fixed size for any given type of vehicle; larger magnets are needed for higher power levels, which are used on higher-speed vehicles. Thus the only real variable is the frequency of the power supply. At the time, efficient high-power frequency conversion was expensive and heavy, so using standard 50 Hz mains power was the only practical system. Considering these inputs, a single-sided LIM demanded flux "core" about 30 cm deep, which would add enormously to the cost of the tracks.

== Magnetic River ==
In February 1969, Laithwaite's team made a breakthrough that improved the practicality of the single-sided LIM for high-speed use. They noticed that by turning the vehicle-mounted rotor side of the motor through 90 degrees, so it was aligned "across" the tracks instead of along them, the flux was able to spread through the entire stator plate, thereby eliminating the problems with depth. Once again, a simple thin aluminum sheet would serve as an appropriate stator plate. As Laithwaite later noted, there was no reason not to consider this design from the start, it had simply not come up during the development of the LIM from rotary electric motors, which had their primaries aligned "along" the stator in the same fashion as earlier LIMs. These new arrangements were known as Traverse Flux Machines, or TFMs.

During the development of the TFM, maglev vehicles were a major area of research, especially in Germany. Laithwaite had always been interested in these designs, and invested some effort developing his own versions. Most maglev systems used a series of magnets to provide lift, and separate sets to provide guidance side-to-side along the rail. All of these designs had considerable problems with stability, and required electronic systems to maintain the ride. Laithwaite was highly critical of any design that used attractive forces for lift, and felt a repulsive system, which is naturally stable, would be a better design.

Laithwaite developed a repulsive-based maglev using two long conductors set on either side of a flux plate. The conductors ran down the top of the plate off the end, were bent through 180 degrees, and then ran back along the top of the plate, forming a long U-shape. Running current through the loops of wire caused magnetic fields that were repulsive over the loops, and attractive in the area between them. This meant that if the motor became uncentered compared to the stator plate, it would naturally feel a force pulling it back to the center. The only downside of this approach is that the vehicle in proper alignment feels both attractive and repulsive forces, meaning that greater energy is needed to provide the required amount of lift. The system did not provide thrust, only lift, so the team proposed to place a thin LIM between the two lift coils.

Tom Fellows of the Tracked Hovercraft team approached Laithwaite to build a model of a maglev system for the upcoming Transpo '72 trade show. Using the repulsive design he found that the model required a very wide motor, about 25 cm for a track that was to be only 9 m long, so Laithwaite began examining ways to reduce the system size. One early change was to move the conductors from lying on the top of the motor to having one half of the loop under the flux plate. This was found to cause the system to become unstable, until someone accidentally hooked up the lift conductors the "wrong way" so the current flowed in the same direction in the two loops. This immediately caused the system to stabilize.

When Laithwaite hired an engineering firm to build the model, they noted that a 9 m long stack of iron plates would be highly unlikely to survive the journey to the US intact. Considering the problem, Fredrick Eastham considered breaking the track down into multiple sections, each with its own lift loops. This led to a design using a series of U-shaped iron cores with looped wire creating a flux in them, similar to ½ of a transformer core. When this arrangement was tried out, it was found that it provided lift from both arms of the U, eliminating the need for two rows of lift coils. Finally, by connecting the U's to a 3-phase power supply, thrust was created. This was the magnetic river.

== Description ==
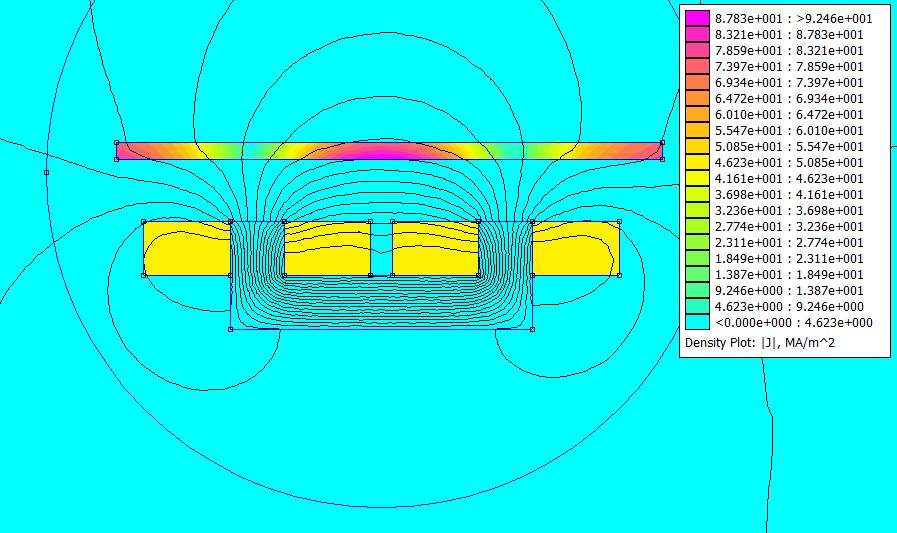
FEMM simulation of a Cross-section of Magnetic River, coloured by electric current density

In magnetic river the conductive plate is a critical width relative to the magnets underneath it.

The row of magnets for the linear motor each have two poles, with the poles arranged transverse to the 'river' with U-shaped cores, and excited with an AC current.

When energised the magnets produce an oscillating transverse field which cuts the plate. The plate then generates two eddy currents, one above each pole.

However, the edge reduces the size of the eddy current on each side, since it interferes with the circular current. Moving the plate sideways increases the current on one side, since the edge is interfering less, and this pushes that side higher. The plate is also pulled laterally back towards the centre by the currents, stabilising the lateral motion.

This stabilisation only works provided that the plate is not too wide or too narrow, and is also somewhat dependent on levitation height, the plate must be wider at higher lifts.
