= Eric Laithwaite =

British electrical engineer (1921–1997)

Professor Eric Roberts Laithwaite
- Born: 14 June 1921; Atherton, Lancashire, England
- Died: 27 November 1997 (aged 76); Falmer, East Sussex, England
- Occupation: Electrical engineer
- Known for: Pioneering work in Maglev technology
- Spouse: Sheila Gooddie

Eric Roberts Laithwaite (14 June 1921 – 27 November 1997) was an English electrical engineer, known as the "Father of Maglev" for his development of the linear induction motor and maglev rail system after Hermann Kemper.

== Biography ==
=== Early life ===
Eric Roberts Laithwaite was born in Atherton, Lancashire on 14 June 1921, raised in the Fylde, Lancashire and educated at Kirkham Grammar School. He joined the Royal Air Force in 1941. Through his service in World War II, he rose to the rank of Flying Officer, becoming a test engineer for autopilot technology at the Royal Aircraft Establishment in Farnborough.

=== Post-war further education ===
On demobilization in 1946, he attended the University of Manchester to study electrical engineering. His work on the Manchester Mark I computer earned him his master's degree. His subsequent doctoral work started his interest in linear induction motors. He derived an equation for "goodness" which parametrically describes the efficiency of a motor in general terms, and showed that it tended to imply that large motors are more efficient.

=== Professor of engineering ===
He became professor of heavy electrical engineering at Imperial College London in 1964 where he continued his successful development of the linear motor. He was involved in creating a self-stable magnetic levitation system called Magnetic river which appeared in the film The Spy Who Loved Me where it levitated and propelled a tray along a table to decapitate a seated dummy.

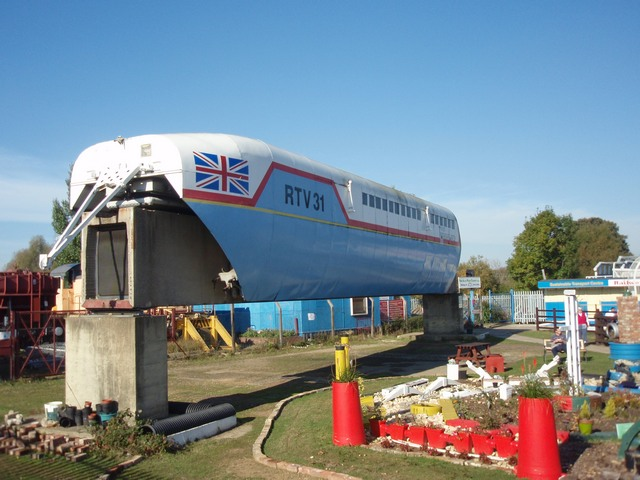
All that remains of the Tracked Hovercraft test system, the RTV 31 test vehicle and a single portion of its guideway preserved at Railworld near Peterborough

He also worked at applying linear motors on the Tracked Hovercraft until its cancellation.

In the 1980s, he was involved in creating a device to extract energy from sea waves. Although the technology was successful in trials, it could not be made storm proof, so it never became a commercial success.

Laithwaite was an able communicator who made many television appearances. Notable among these were his Royal Institution Christmas Lectures to young people in 1966 and 1974. The latter of these made much of the surprising properties of the gyroscope.

In 1974, Laithwaite was invited by the Royal Institution to give a talk on a subject of his own choosing. He decided to lecture about gyroscopes, a subject in which he had only recently become interested. His interest had been aroused by an amateur inventor named Alex Jones, who contacted Laithwaite about a reactionless propulsion drive he (Jones) had invented.

After seeing a demonstration of Jones's small prototype (a small wagon with a swinging pendulum which advanced intermittently along a table top), Laithwaite became convinced that "he had seen something impossible". In his lecture before the Royal Institution he claimed that gyroscopes weigh less when spinning and, to demonstrate this, he showed that he could lift a spinning gyroscope mounted on the end of a rod easily with one hand but could not do so when the gyroscope was not spinning. This was discussed in the BBC science series Horizon - 2015-2016: 2. Project Greenglow - The Quest for Gravity Control.

In his 1974 lectures, Laithwaite suggested that Newton's laws of motion could not account for the behaviour of gyroscopes and that they could be used as a means of reactionless propulsion. The members of the Royal Institution rejected his ideas and his lectures were not published at the time, a first for the Royal Institution. His lectures were subsequently published independently as Engineer Through The Looking-Glass and also on the Royal Institution website.

Despite this rejection and the fact that Laithwaite later acknowledged that gyroscopes behave fully in accord with Newtonian mechanics, he continued to explore gyroscopic behaviour, maintaining the belief that some form of reactionless propulsion could be derived from them. Laithwaite set up Gyron Ltd with William Dawson and, in 1993, applied for a patent entitled "Propulsion System". A United States Patent, Number 5860317, was granted in 1999.

Although Laithwaite is best known for his ideas concerning gyroscopes, he also held an idea concerning moths. He proposed that they communicate via ultra short wave electromagnetic phenomena (Inventor in the Garden of Eden, E R Laithwaite 1994 page 199). He persisted in this belief even after the pheromone which they actually use had been isolated and could even be bought "over-the-counter" – seemingly contradicting his account. However, he had argued in 1960 that there must be two different mechanisms for detecting pheromones: (i) The orthodox account of chemical-gradients (effective only at short-range), and (ii) some method for long-distance detection (> "100 yards") even when the wind was in an unfavourable direction – and the only credible solution then had to be electromagnetic (probably infrared). This explanation did not account for where the necessary energy might come from – a matter later taken up by P. S. Callahan, though he too suffered considerable controversy (largely due to Laithwaite's detractors overlooking his "(i)/(ii)" distinction).

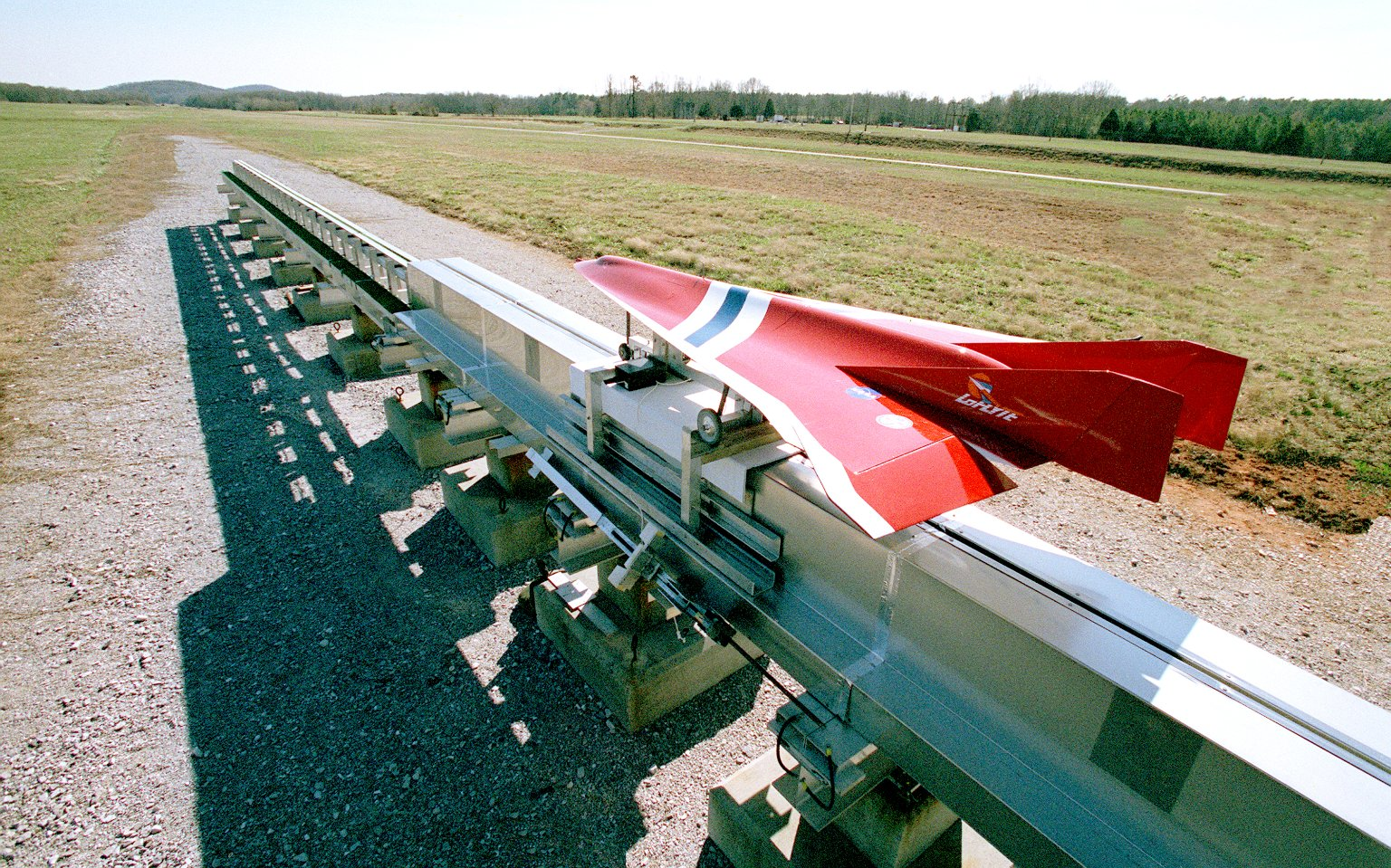
Magnetic Launch Assist System

Laithwaite retired from Imperial College in 1986, but was offered no other research post until 1990, when he became Visiting Professor at the University of Sussex. He was persuaded by George Scelzo of PRT Maglev Systems in Chicago to submit a proposal to NASA for an electromagnetic launch assist track originally inspired by John C. Mankins of NASA. He died within weeks of the contract being awarded.

The initial stage has been successfully continued by William Dawson and the contract with PRT for this development is still active. The track uses both levitation coils and linear induction motors and it can be seen in the "Magnets" episode of Modern Marvels on the History Channel.

In 1994, Laithwaite was one of six eminent scientists to be featured in the BBC series Heretic.

== Personal life ==
Laithwaite was also a keen entomologist and the co-author of The Dictionary of Butterflies and Moths (1975); he had one of the finest British collections of specimens. He married Sheila Gooddie in 1951; they had two sons and two daughters.

He died at Falmer, East Sussex on 27 November 1997.

== Published works ==
=== Articles ===
- A Radiation Theory of the Assembling of Moths The Entomologist, June–July 1960, vol. 93 (1166–1167), pp. 113–117, 133–137 +plate (III)
- Eric Laithwaite, "Linear motors for high-speed vehicles", New Scientist, 28 June 1973, p. 802-805
- "Eric Laithwaite defies Newton", New Scientist, 14 November 1974, p470
- "The multiplication of bananas by umbrellas" Electrical Review, 20–27 December 1974, pp. 822–824
- "The bigger they are, the harder they fall" Electrical Review, 14 February 1975, pp. 40–42
- "1975 – A space odyssey" Electrical Review, 28 March – 4 April 1975, pp. 398–400
- "Roll Isaac, roll – Part I" Electrical Review, Vol. 204, No. 7, 16 February 1979, pp. 38–41
- "Roll Isaac, roll – Part II" Electrical Review, Vol. 204, No. 11, 16 March 1979, pp. 31–33
- "Give us a sign" Electrical Review, Vol. 207, No. 3, 18 July 1980, pp. 40–42
- "Gaze in wonder: an engineer looks at biology", (1988), Speculations in Science and Technology, vol.11(4), 341–345.
- "The influence of Michael Faraday on power engineering". Power engineering journal, Vol.5, No. 5, September 1991, pp. 209–219

=== Books ===
- Propulsion without wheels (1965)
- Induction machines for special purposes (1966)
- The engineer in wonderland (1967) — The Royal Institution of Great Britain Christmas lectures, 1966/67. With illustrations, including a portrait.
- The linear motor and its application to tracked hovercraft (1971)
- Linear electric motors (1971) Mills & Boon Monographs and Technical Library
- Experiments with a linear induction motor (1971)
- Exciting electrical machines (1974)
- All things are possible: an engineer looks at research and development (1976)
- Transport without wheels ed. (1977)
- How to invent (1977) co-written by Meredith Thring
- Why does a glow-worm glow? (1977) illustrated by Mike Jackson
- Electric energy: its generation, transmission and use (1980) co-written by L.L. Freris
- Engineer through the looking glass (1980)— a revised and expanded version of his Royal Institution of Great Britain Christmas lectures, 1974/75. With illustrations, including a portrait.
- Invitation to engineering (1984)
- Shape is important (1986)
- Force: a basic ingredient (1986)
- A history of linear electric motors (1986)
- Using materials (1987)
- Size is vital (1987)
- An inventor in the Garden of Eden (1994)

== Honours ==
- S. G. Brown Medal of the Royal Society (1966)
- IEEE Nikola Tesla Award of the Institute of Electrical and Electronics Engineers
- Fellow of Imperial College London (1991)
- Honorary Fellow of the Institution of Electrical Engineers (1992)

== See also ==
- List of maglev train proposals
- UK Ultraspeed
