= Maggie Kingsley =

Maggie Kingsley is the pseudonym of Margaret Gray, a Scottish-born writer of Mills & Boon medical romances. Apart from one book – For Jodie's Sake – all of her medical romances are set in Scotland. In 2008 she also had "A Baby For Eve" published which is set in Cornwall and part of the "Brides of Penhally Bay" series.

== Books published ==
- Question of Trust (1996)
- A Time to Change (1996)
- Partners in Love (1996)
- Daniel's Dilemma (1998)
- A Baby to Love (1998)
- Izzie's Choice (1999)
- For Jodie's Sake (2000)
- Just Good Friends (2000)
- Changing Lives (2000)
- A Wife for Dr.Cunningham (2001)
- Dr. Mathieson's Daughter (2001)
- The Stranger's Secret (2002)
- Doctor and Son (2002)*
- The Surgeon’s Marriage (2003)*
- The Playboy Consultant (2003)*
- The Surgeon's Marriage Demand (2004)*
- The Good Father (2006)*
- A Consultant Claims His Bride (2006)*
- The Consultant’s Italian Knight (2007)
- A Wife Worth Waiting For (2007)
- A Baby For Eve (2008)
- Belfield Infirmary books
