= Mills & Boon Monographs and Technical Library =

Mills & Boon Monographs and Technical Library are short works on advanced technical engineering subjects published in the early 1970s by Mills & Boon, a British publisher better known for its romances.

The monographs are in series, for example: Mechanics Engineering Monographs, Mechanics Engineering Library and Electrical Engineering Monographs.

The library was the idea of Dr J. Gordon Cook, and consists of "concise up to date authoritative information" on new fields or fields where progress was being made. The authors were acknowledged experts in their fields.

== List of monographs ==
Key: TL = Technical library, CE = Chemical engineering, ME = Mechanical engineering

- S L Hurst (1971). Threshold logic: an engineering survey.
- P F M Paul (1971). The principles of gas extraction.
- Guy Hermon Booth (1971). Microbiological corrosion.
- E R Laithwaite (1971). Linear electric motors.
- Ian Stewart Pearsall (1972). Cavitation.
- D G Skinner (1971). The fluidised combustion of coal.
- E Kettlewell (1971). The magnetron oscillator.
- Michael John Fletcher (1971). Vacuum brazing.
- Igor Aleksander (1971). Microcircuit learning computers.
- Ernest Demetrios Hondros (1971). Tribology.
- Peter Greenfield (1971). Engineering applications of beryllium.
- J. Gibson and F. Gregory (1971). Carbonisation of coal.
- Michael John Fletcher (1971). Electron beam welding.
- John George Simmons (1971). DC conduction in thin films.
- J W Orton (1971). Material for the Gunn effect.
- W S Wise (1971). Solvent treatment of coal.
- Duncan Chisholm (1971). The Heat Pipe.
- John Burls (1971). Diamond grinding: recent research and developments. ME. Vol. 6. ISBN 0-263-51791-8.
- I M Firth (1972). Holography and computer generated holograms.
- Peter Greenfield (1972). Creep of metals at high temperatures.
- Basil Edward Purkiss (1972). Biotechnology of industrial water conservation.
- G F Weston (1972). Glow discharge display.
- D P Gregory (1972). Fuel cells.
- George McHardy Sturgeon (1972). Metal strip from powder.
- Cyril Charles Evans (1972). Whiskers.
- John Nicholas Holmes (1972). Speech synthesis. EE. Vol. 7. ISBN 978-0-263-51845-0.
- John Anthony Weaver (1972). Reading machines.
- H L Burrus (1972). Lamp phosphors.
- Peter Greenfield (1972). Magnesium.
- Michael John Fletcher (1972). Friction welding.
- Peter Greenfield (1972). Zirconium in nuclear technology.
- P J Wakeling (1972). Pulse code modulation.
- D P Gregory (1972). Metal-air batteries.
- Henry L Burrus (1972). Lamp phospors.
- Robert Fyffe Smart (1972). Developments in plasma spraying. ISBN 978-0-263-05074-5.
- J A Catherall (1973). Fibre reinforcement. ISBN 978-0-263-05119-3.
- Robert Fyffe Smart (1973). Developments in powder metallurgy. ISBN 978-0-263-05120-9.
- Donald Geoffrey Avery (1973). Uranium enrichment by gas centrifuge. TL:CE. Vol. 2. ISBN 0-263-05121-8.
