= Gerald Rusgrove Mills =

British publisher (1877–1928)

Gerald Rusgrove Mills (3 January 1877 – 23 September 1928) was a publisher who, along with Charles Boon, established the publishing company Mills & Boon in 1908.

== Early life ==
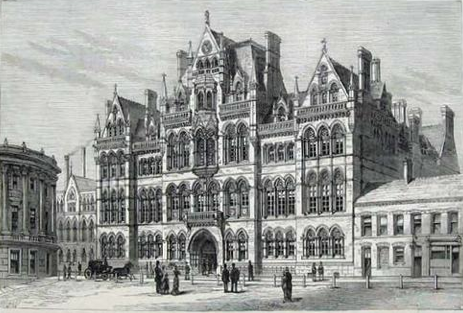
Mason Science College, now the University of Birmingham

Gerald Rusgrove Mills was born on 3 January 1877 in Stourbridge as the eldest son of Harry Mills, a solicitor. He had a comfortable childhood. After attending Mason Science College (which later became the University of Birmingham) and Caius College, Cambridge, Mills started his association with the publishing industry when he joined the educational publishers Whitaker & Co. in London. He later joined the publisher Methuen & Co. as educational manager where he met his future collaborator Charles Boon who was then working as a sales manager. After working in Methuen & Co. for about 10 years, Mills and Boon joined together and founded their own firm Mills & Boon in 1908 with an initial investment of £1000.

== Publishing ==
In its early days, Mills & Boon was not an exclusive publisher of romantic fiction: it published general fiction, "travel guides, children’s and craft books", as well as "educational textbooks, socialist tracts and Shakespeare". The company continued to publish such titles till the unexpected death of Mills in 1928. After Mills' death, Boon remade the company as a single-genre publishing house, publishing only romantic fiction.

== Personal life ==
Gerald Mills married Rose Shawood Anderson in 1912; they had no children.

== Death ==
He died in South Kensington on 23 September 1928 aged 51.
