= Igor Aleksander =

Yugoslav neural network scientist (born 1937)

Professor Igor Aleksander FREng
- Born: 26 January 1937 (age 89); Zagreb, Kingdom of Yugoslavia
- Education: Queen Mary College, London
- Scientific career
- Thesis: Decimal array logic (1966)

Igor Aleksander (born 26 January 1937) is an emeritus professor of Neural Systems Engineering in the Department of Electrical and Electronic Engineering at Imperial College London. He worked in artificial intelligence and neural networks and designed the world's first neural pattern recognition system in the 1980s.

== Life and work ==
Aleksander was educated in Italy and graduated from the University of the Witwatersrand in South Africa, arriving in the UK in the late 1950s, intending to become a research student under Colin Cherry. Instead he found work with Standard Telephones and Cables, later joining Queen Mary College where he gained a PhD, subsequently becoming a lecturer there in 1961. He moved to the University of Kent in 1968 as a reader in Electronics and then to Brunel University as professor in 1974. In 1984 he became professor at Imperial College London as professor of the Management of Information Technology. He was Head of Electrical Engineering and Gabor Professor of Neural Systems Engineering at Imperial College from 1988 to his retirement in 2002. He was elected Fellow of the Royal Academy of Engineering (1988), and he served as Pro-rector of External Relations at Imperial College (1997). In 2005 he presented the Bernard Price Memorial Lecture.

His work centred on the modelling capability of artificial neural networks. He devised neuromodels of the visual system in primates, visuo-verbal system in humans, the effect of anaesthetics on awareness, and artificial consciousness. He inspired the engineering design of one of the first stand alone neural pattern recognition systems, the WISARD (anonym for Wilkie Stonham Aleksander's Recognition Device) which was named after the co-inventors Bruce Wilkie, John Stonham and Igor Aleksander. This Brunel University prototype WISARD was commercially developed and marketed by Computer Recognition Systems, Wokingham, under the trade name of 'CRS WISARD' in 1984. After this, the further developments of this system do not appear to have been documented. A popular link for WISARD is that of "the wisard pattern recognition machine" at the Winton Gallery, British Science Museum.

Aleksander received an honorary degree in Computer Engineering from University of Palermo in July 2011.

== See also ==
- Artificial Imagination
- Cybernetics Society
- Journal of Consciousness Studies
- Philosophy of artificial intelligence
- Strong AI
- Superintelligence

== Selected publications ==
=== Books ===
- 1971, Microcircuit learning computers, London: Mills & Boon Monographs and Technical Library
- 1975, I.Aleksander, F. Keith Hanna, Automata Theory: An Engineering Approach New York: Crane Russak, London: Edward Arnold.
- 1990, I.Aleksander, H. Morton, An Introduction to Neural Computing, London: Chapman & Hall ISBN 0-412-37780-2
- 1996, Impossible Minds: My neurons, My Consciousness published by Imperial College Press ISBN 1-86094-036-6.
- 2000, How to Build a Mind, London: Weidenfeld and Nicolson
- 2005, The World in My Mind, My Mind In The World: Key Mechanisms of Consciousness in Humans, Animals and Machines published by Imprint Academic, ISBN 1-84540-021-6.

=== Articles ===
- 1994, K. Warwick. "Weightless brains", Review of Neurons and Symbols by Igor Aleksander and Helen Morton, The Times Higher Education Supplement, p. 31, February (1994)
- 1996, N. Sales, R. Evans, I. Aleksander. "Successful naive representation grounding", in: Artificial Intelligence Review, vol. 10, no.1–2, pp. 83–102.
- 1997, Evolutionary Checkers in: Nature, Vol. 402, Dec. 1999, pp. 857–860.
- 1997, I. Aleksander, C. Browne, R. Evans, N. Sales, "Conscious and Neural Cognizers: A Review and Some Recent Approaches", in: Neural Networks, Vol. 10, No. 7, pp. 1303–1316.
- 2003, "Axioms and Tests for the Presence of Minimal Consciousness in Agents", in: Journal of Consciousness Studies
- 2008, "Machine consciousness", Scholarpedia 3(2):4162.
