= Charles Boon =

British publisher (1877–1943)

- Born: 9 May 1877; Westminster, London, England
- Died: 2 December 1943 (aged 66)
- Occupation: Publisher
- Known for: Co-founder of Mills & Boon

Charles Thomas Boon (9 May 1877 – 2 December 1943) was a publisher who, along with Gerald Rusgrove Mills, founded the publishing company Mills & Boon in 1908.

== Early life ==
Charles Boon was born on 9 May 1877 in London as the eldest of the six children of his father Charles Boon, who was a brewer's servant. Since his parents were poor, Charles Boon had a deprived childhood. His father died when Boon was only 12 years old, and Boon had to leave school and take up odd jobs to support his family. During this period, he also worked in a bookshop and a circulating library, which gave him insights into the sales and distribution of books. In 1893 Boon joined Methuen & Co., a publishing firm in London, as an office boy and warehouse clerk. Eventually he rose to become the general manager of the firm. While at Methuen & Co., Boon met Gerald Mills, who was also working in the same firm.

== Publishing ==
Gerald Mills and Charles Boon joined hands in 1908 to establish their own publishing house Mills & Boon with an initial investment of £1000. The company was planned as a diversified publisher, publishing both fiction and nonfiction works. It was a profitable business. However, after the First World War, the company's fortunes declined due to intense competition from established bigger publishing houses. Gerald Mills, Boon's partner in business, died in 1928 giving a devastating blow to Mills & Boon. However, in 1930, Boon reshaped his company and made it into what it is known for today, a publishing house publishing only romantic fiction.

== Personal life and death ==
Boon married Mary Alice Cowpe in 1911. They had four children. Boon died aged 66 on 2 December 1943 from a cerebral haemorrhage.
