= Mills & Boon =

British romance publishing imprint

- Parent company: Harlequin Enterprises
- Status: Active
- Founded: 1908
- Founder: Gerald Rusgrove Mills and Charles Boon
- Country of origin: United Kingdom
- Headquarters location: Richmond, London
- Distribution: International
- Publication types: Books / eBooks
- Fiction genres: Romance
- Imprints: Many
- Official website: www.millsandboon.co.uk

Mills & Boon is a romance imprint of British publisher Harlequin UK Ltd. It was founded in 1908 by Gerald Rusgrove Mills and Charles Boon as a general publisher. The company moved towards escapist fiction for women in the 1930s. In 1971, the publisher was bought by the Canadian company Harlequin Enterprises, its North American distributor based in Toronto, with whom it had a long informal partnership. The two companies offer a number of imprints that between them account for almost three-quarters of the romance paperbacks published in Britain. Its print books are presently out-numbered and out-sold by the company's e-books, which allowed the publisher to double its output.

Modern Mills & Boon novels, over 100 of which are released each month, cover a wide range of possible romantic subgenres, varying in explicitness, setting and style, although retaining a comforting familiarity that meets reader expectations.

== History ==
Mills & Boon was founded by former employees of the Methuen publishing house, Gerald Rusgrove Mills (3 January 1877 – 23 September 1928) and Charles Boon (9 May 1877 – 2 December 1943) in 1908 as a general fiction publisher, although their first book was a romance. An early signing was the mystery and crime writer Victor Bridges. Mills & Boon also published—in 1911 and 1912—two early works by Hugh Walpole, including Mr Perrin and Mr Traill, which was later adapted into the film of the same name. Between 1912 and 1923, it published numerous adventure titles by Jack London. In its early years the company also published "educational textbooks, socialist tracts and Shakespeare" as well as "travel guides, children’s and craft books".

It was not until the 1930s that the company began to concentrate specifically on romances.

From the very beginning, Mills & Boon published in a form and at a price that was within the reach of a wide readership. In the 1930s the company noted the rapid rise of commercial circulating libraries and the growing appetite for escapism during the Depression years. Due to these types of libraries, Mills & Boon were able to produce over 160 titles every year during that decade. Historian Ross McKibbin has argued that 'it was the rapid growth of the ‘tuppenny libraries’ in the interwar years which transformed Mills and Boon into a firm which exclusively published romantic fiction.' The favourite genre was romance and the company decided to concentrate on hardback romances, a policy which became increasingly successful. These titles were initially sold through weekly, two-penny libraries. There, they became known as 'the brown books', because of their distinctive binding.

Mills & Boon's innovative marketing strategies also contributed to their novels' popularity. Since 1930, this was evident when the company sent a copy of a chapter of one of their books to whoever formally requested one. Furthermore, the company's innovative marketing extended to creating eye-catching covers, with attention-grabbing colours and "romantic images of couples or the beautiful heroine", to display in store windows.

During World War II, Mills & Boon created ads that notified the public that they could go to their bookseller and place a standing order on any of their books. This guaranteed that Mills & Boons would always keep their novels in stock in bookstores, despite the shortages and other challenges to businesses that resulted from the war. This marketing technique also created a sense of urgency, due to an implication that there was a limited supply for whoever didn't place a standing order. These ads significantly contributed to the company's expansion.

With the decline of commercial lending libraries in the late 1950s, the company's most profitable move was to realise that there would remain a strong market for romance novels, but that sales would depend on readers having easy access to reasonably priced books. As a result, Mills & Boon romance became widely available from newsagents across the country. Mills & Boon began to publish in paperback in the 1960s.

Beginning in 1958, they made an agreement with Harlequin in Canada to sell reprints of Mills & Boon titles, giving the firm access to the North American market and to make a major move into paperback publishing.

In 1971, the Boon family sold the company to Harlequin Enterprises of Canada. Harlequin, having made a great success out of selling licensed Mills & Boon titles in North America, wanted to secure the editorial source. John Boon, son of the co-founder, continued as head of the company while his brother, Alan, continued as head of editorial. Much of the company's success from the 1950s to the 1980s is credited to Alan Boon's editorial talent.

A considerable portion of Mills & Boon sales were derived from export markets, particularly India, South Africa, Australia, New Zealand and the Philippines. In 1976, an Australian office was established in Sydney to handle sales in the Asia-Pacific region. The success of the Australian operation in the 1970s was such that it was able to begin printing its own editions.

In 1989, Mills & Boon product sampled over 700,000 of their novels to East German women following the Fall of the Berlin Wall. This giveaway led to the novels' popularity in eastern Germany. Within four months of that product sampling event, Mills & Boon's books were sold on newsstands throughout the region; in 2 years they "gained market share in Poland, sold six-and-a-half million romance novels in Hungary, and achieved $10 million in sales in the Czech Republic."

Their books are sold through a combination of subscription and retail sales. For example, in any given month they publish eight novels in their Modern line; six of those are available on the retail market, and all eight are available to buy directly from the company both on- and offline. Mills & Boon encourage readers to subscribe to their favorite lines, and those books will then be delivered to their home.

One distinctive feature of both Mills & Boon and Harlequin (in North America) is the length of time their books are available to buy. They publish a set number of books each month which are sent to subscribers and displayed on stands in book shops. At the end of the month, any unsold copies in the shops are withdrawn and pulped. Titles are available to buy direct from Mills & Boon for 3 months or until they are sold out, whichever is sooner. Fans looking for particular books after this time must find them second-hand.

Mills & Boon has over 3 million regular readers in the UK annually. Romantic fiction constitutes the largest section of the adult paperback fiction market and Harlequin Mills & Boon publishes series fiction, promotional titles, gift packs and single titles under different brands and imprints: Mills & Boon and Mira.

As of 2008, 200 million Mills & Boon novels were sold globally per annum and, in the United Kingdom, one paperback was sold on average every 6.6 seconds. Mills & Boon accounted for nearly three-quarters of the British romantic fiction market in that year.

Outside the UK, Mills & Boon novels were officially launched in India in 2008, although they were already popular in the country due to unofficial imports and purchases from abroad. Sales swiftly increased, doubling over the 2009–2010 period.

According to Mills & Boon, an author can receive royalties of between £2,000 to £30,000 per book.

=== Centenary year ===
2008 was Mills & Boon's centenary as a publisher. This was marked by a number of events and exhibitions. In November 2008, BBC Four celebrated the anniversary by broadcasting the 90-minute drama Consuming Passion: 100 Years of Mills & Boon, written by Emma Frost.

=== Electronic publishing ===
Electronic publishing has allowed Mills & Boon to double its output. As of 2012, it now releases over 100 e-books per month, more than in print, and sells more e-books than physical books. Parent company Torstar cited the strong growth of e-books in its 2010 report, with digital revenues up CAN$16.1 Million.

According to Tim Cooper, digital and marketing director for the publisher, "digital lends itself to the habitual nature of our content. Our readers finish reading one and they can download the next." Author Sharon Kendrick's opinion is similar: "[Mills & Boon] are an intense reading experience, and they can be read quickly. People read four to five in a few days so that's a lot of books to carry around."

Another factor in favour of electronic publishing is the lack of a visible cover. Cooper notes that "part of the appeal of digital reading is that nobody necessarily knows what you're reading." Kendrick supports this view as well, saying, "one of the things about reading romance is that slightly furtive thing, the 'oh God, I can't be seen on the train reading a romance'. If you've got a Kindle then no one knows what you're reading. It's not about embarrassment, really—it's more that you don't want to be judged, and we are often judged by what we read."

The more sexually explicit Spice imprint sells particularly well in electronic format, compared to the Modern imprint which is the most successful in print.

== Critical opinion ==
The company has been criticised for repeating plots, the inevitability of their happy endings, and a simple writing style, whereas fans cite predictability as a key reason for reading.

While there is no template or standard outline and authors are allowed full artistic freedom, there are, however, genre conventions that need to be met to be successful. Penny Jordan, an author writing for Mills & Boon, has stated that "[the rules] are not written down, but if you diverge from reader expectations, they won't read your second book."

In popular imagination and feminist criticism, the heroine of a stereotypical Mills & Boon novel is often seen as a passive virgin who is submissive to the hero in every way. This was often true in older novels but changed over the years; modern novels feature more active protagonists. Mills & Boon heroines cover a wide variety of types, often depending on the author's preference. Romantic encounters were embodied in a principle of sexual purity that demonstrated not only social conservatism, but also how heroines could control their personal autonomy.

The attributes of the heroes of Mills & Boon novels have not significantly changed over time, however, almost always being a dominant alpha male. Joanna Bowring, co-curator of the Mills & Boon centenary exhibition at Manchester Central Library in 2008, notes that "there's always been a subtle undercurrent of force throughout the books and that's never changed from the earliest ones. Even later, when other aspects are influenced by feminism and the shifting attitudes outside the novel, the men are masterful and stern." In 1966, the Mills & Boon author Hilary Wilde said "The odd thing is that if I met one of my heroes, I would probably bash him over the head with an empty whisky bottle. It is a type I loathe and detest. I imagine in all women, deep down inside us, is a primitive desire to be arrogantly bullied." Many critics point to the comments by another of Mills & Boon's writers, Violet Winspear, in 1970, that all her heroes "must frighten and fascinate. They must be the sort of men who are capable of rape". Bindel argues that, as heroines have acquired greater agency, the heroes have become even more domineering and misogynistic. Other critics contend that these characters are outdated and inappropriate for modern works. However, supporters of the publisher counter that Mills & Boon are careful to follow their readers' tastes and interests; if the hero follows this trend it is because that is what the readers want.

In modern novels, popular hero archetypes are Arab sheikhs, Italian billionaires, Greek tycoons, and princes. According to Mills & Boon author Sharon Kendrick, "the sheikh represents the ultimate female fantasy." Penny Jordan adds that the hero often has a softer side, which the heroine will discover during the course of the novel: "He's often damaged by something that's happened in his life, often to do with money. He will be more outrageous to the heroine, and harder on her. He realises he is beginning to feel, he has to resolve that conflict."

In 2011, psychologist Susan Quilliam blamed romantic fiction, and Mills & Boon in particular, for poor sexual health and relationship breakdowns. She made the claim in her paper "'He seized her in his manly arms and bent his lips to hers…'. The surprising impact that romantic novels have on our work" in the Journal of Family Planning & Reproductive Health Care published by the BMJ Group. In the paper, Quilliam writes "what we see in our [family planning clinic] consulting rooms is more likely to be informed by Mills & Boon than by the Family Planning Association." Quilliam argues that a correlation exists between negative attitudes toward the use of condoms and reading of romantic fiction; as well as citing a survey that shows only 11.5 per cent of romantic novels mention condom use. She suggests that a romance reader may "not [use] protection with a new man because she wants to be swept up by the moment as a heroine would." Among other potential problems, romantic fiction readers are also likely to have unrealistic expectations about sex, to equate lack of romance or sexual desire with a lack of love, to see pregnancy as a cure of relationship difficulties and to be less likely to terminate pregnancies. Relationships of romance readers are more likely to break down because they are likely to think that "rather than working at her relationship she should be hitching her star to a new romance." Quilliam also writes that "a deep strand of escapism, perfectionism and idealisation runs through the genre" and "if readers start to believe the story that romantic fiction offers, then they store up trouble for themselves–and then they bring that trouble into our consulting rooms."

== Imprints ==
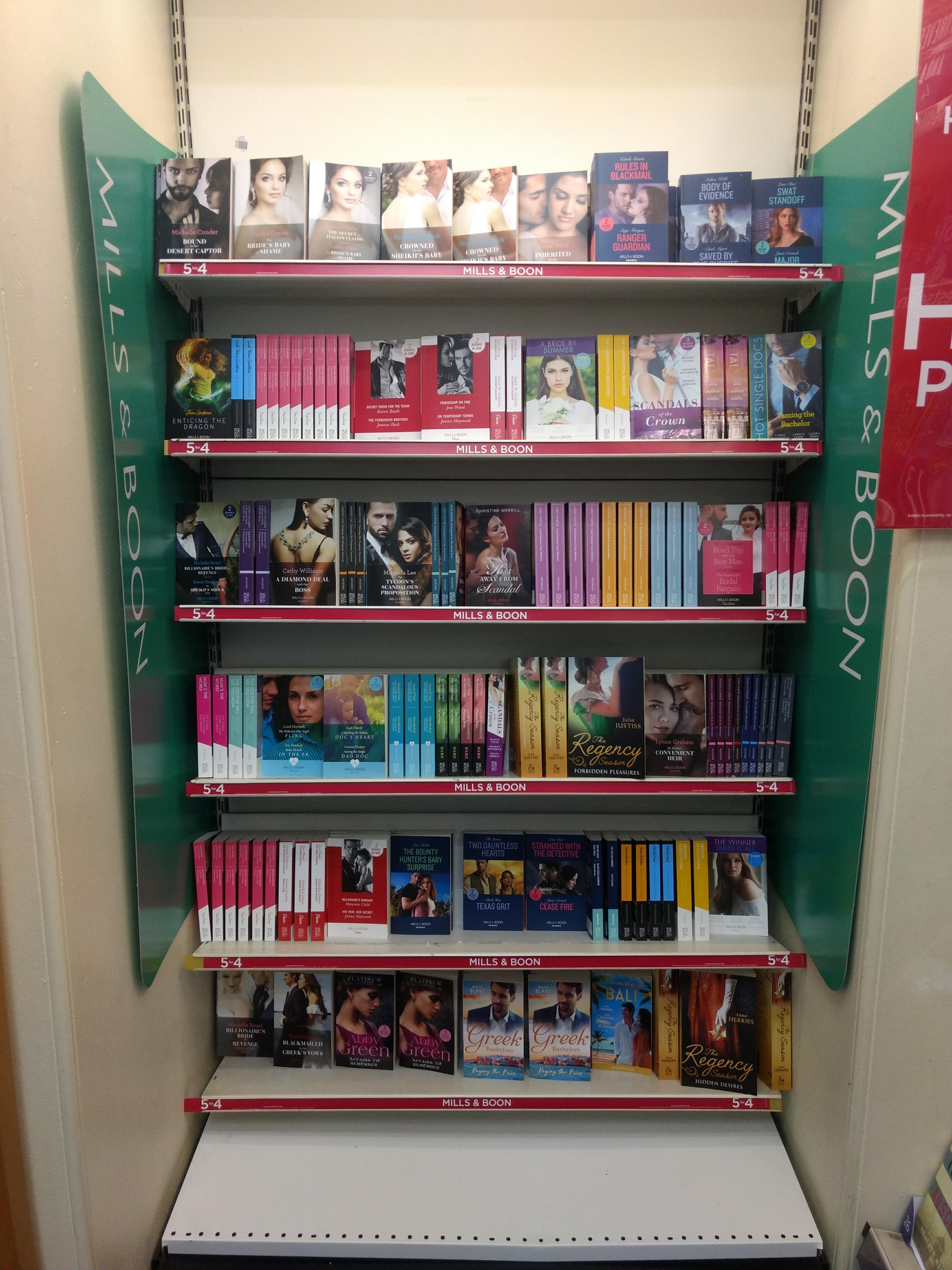
Mills & Boon books at W.H. Smith, Enfield.

=== Current ===
Mills & Boon currently publish several imprints. Several titles are published monthly in most imprints. These are all identifiable by a series title (and sometimes sub-series title) as well as a colour border (which differs depending on the country in which the title is published):

Name	Introduction	Description	Former name(s)
Desire	1983	Sexual novels featuring couples in a contemporary setting with dramatic plots. The imprint consisted of the standard single books until October 2001, when Desire became a two-in-one imprint. Ebook versions depend on length, sometimes having four stories in one.	N/A
Heroes	2013	Features thrilling stories mainly about survival and suspense.	Romantic Suspense (2013–2018)
Historical	1977	Romance mixed with historical fiction (e.g. Romance in 1920s New York or 17th century England.)	Masquerade (1977–1993); Legacy of Love (1993–1996); Historical Romance (1996–2007)
Medical	1977	Contemporary romances set against the background of the medical profession. The relationship explored between doctors and nurses were known as ‘carbolic soap operas’ in written works relevant to the work dynamics heightened by the binary oppositions presented by masculinity and femininity.	Doctor Nurse Romance (1977–1989); Medical Romance (1989–1993, 1996–2007, 2010–2018); Love on Call (1993–1996)
Modern	2000	Novels focus on glamorous and 'sophisticated' passionate romance in international locations. Featuring intense relationships, often very sexual, often reflecting shared feelings and desires.	Modern Romance (2000–2007)
True Love	2018	Warm and emotional novels that focus on capturing the feeling of falling in love.	N/A

==== e-book only imprints ====
Name	Description
Vintage	Backlist titles from the Modern, Desire and Historical imprints published in e-book format.
American Romance	Themed around classically American heroes such as cowboys.
Historical Undone	Shorter length historical editorial of greater sensuality in general than the Historical series.
Kimani	African-American romances.
Love Inspired	Inspirational romance.
Love Inspired Suspense	Inspirational romance containing themes of intrigue or thriller titles.
Love Inspired Historical	Inspirational romance containing historical themes and settings.
Nocturne Cravings	shorter length titles dealing with darker and paranormal themes.

=== Defunct ===
Name	Introduced	Discontinued	Description	Former name(s)
Blaze	2001 (Sensual Romance); 2005 (stand-alone)	2015	Very sexual novels featuring couples in contemporary romantic relationships. It was originally introduced as a supplement series to the Sensual Romance imprint before folding the former.	N/A
By Request	1995	2018	Reissues of novels mainly from Modern or Cherish and associated imprints.	
Cherish	2010	2018	Warm and emotional novels that focus on capturing the feeling of falling in love. It was created as a merger between the Special Moments and Romance lines, and later replaced with True Love.	N/A
Dare	2018	N/A	Sexually explicit novels akin to the former Blaze series.	N/A
Author Duet	1983	1995	A reissue series consisting of two different stories by the same author. It was merged with the Favourites imprint to create By Request.	The Best Of... Author (1983–1986); Author Collection (1986–1992)
Enchanted	1996	2000	A mystery-themed series. It was created as a split of the long-running Romance imprint and was replaced with Tender Romance.	
Favourites	1977	1995	A reissue series featuring previously released books. It was merged with the Duet imprint to create By Request.	Classics (1977–1981); Best Seller Romance (1981–1993)
Harlequin Love Affair	1984	1988	The UK version of the Harlequin American Romance imprint used in the United States. It was later replaced with the Silhouette Sensation imprint.	N/A
Heartwarming	2016	2020	Books that celebrate traditional values and love.	N/A
Intrigue	1994	2018	Romance mixed with the suspense or thriller genre. Originally introduced as a Silhouette imprint in 1994, with the Silhouette Sensation theme merging into it in 2007 and was discontinued in 2018.	Silhouette Intrigue (1994–2007)
Love Inspired	2018	2020's	Books about faith, hope and the power of love itself.	N/A
Modern Extra	2004	2007	Sister series to Modern. Originally a two-in-one imprint consisting of a reissue and a new book, but transitioned solely to new stories in 2006. It was replaced with Modern Heat.	Modern Romance Extra (2004–2007)
Modern Tempted	2008	2015	Novels aimed at younger readers.	Modern Heat (2008–2010); Riva (2010–2013)
Nocturne	2008	2018	Paranormal romance imprint, mixing romance with genres such as horror, science fiction and fantasy. It was originally introduced as a sub-theme to Intrigue before being split as a standalone imprint in 2010.	Intrigue Nocturne (2008–2010)
Packs	N/A	N/A	Three to four books released in a slipcase.	N/A
Presents	1996	2000	More explicit titles. It was created as a split of the long-running Romance imprint and was replaced with Modern Romance.	
Romance	1960s	1996	Mills & Boon's first ever and oldest running imprint, featuring traditional romance stories. It was split up into the Presents and Enchanted imprints.	
Romance	2006	2010	A revival of the Romance theme, replacing Tender Romance, and later merged with Special Moments to create Chrish.	
Silhouette Sensation	1988	2007	A replacement to Love Affair, this theme consisted of UK reprints of Silhouette American Romance and Romantic Suspense books from the United States. It was merged into Intrigue following Mills & Boon retiring the usage of the Silhouette brand in the UK.	
Sensual Romance	2000	2005	Very sexual novels. It replaced the Temptation before being merged into its own Blaze sub-imprint following the discontinuation of its US counterpart Harlequin Temptation.	N/A
Special Edition	1983	2009	Compelling love stories that capture the intensity of living, loving and family in today’s world. It mainly consisted of books from the US version of the imprint. It was merged with Superromance to create the Special Moments imprint.	Silhouette Special Edition (1983–2007)
Special Moments	2009	2010	It replaced the Special Edition and Superromance imprints before merging with Romance to create the Cherish imprint.	
Special Releases	N/A	N/A	A generic name used to describe seasonal collections and reissue anthologies.	N/A
Spice	2009	2015	An erotic fiction imprint, featuring casual sex and bondage. The most explicit imprint published by Mills & Boon.	
Spotlight	2003	2011	A reissue series consisting of past Silhouette books. It was later merged into By Request in 2011.	Silhouette Spotlight (2003–2007)
Supernatural	2018	2020's	Stories focusing on paranormal romance, similar to the Intrigue line.	
Superromance	2001	2009	Consists of Realistic, passionate, contemporary novels, normally sourced from the US Harlequin Superromance imprint. It was merged with Special Edition to create the Special Moments imprint.	Silhouette Superromance (2001–2007)
Tender Romance	2000	2006	Standard Romance novels. It replaced Enchanted, and was replaced with the revived Romance.	

== See also ==
- Lawrence Heisey
- Margaret Pargeter
- Mills & Boon Monographs and Technical Library
