= Goodness factor =

Metric for determining the efficiency of an electric motor

The goodness factor is a metric developed by Eric Laithwaite to determine the 'goodness' of an electric motor. Using it he was able to develop efficient magnetic levitation induction motors.

$$G = \frac {\omega} {\mathrm{resistance} \times \mathrm{reluctance}} = \frac {\omega \mu \sigma A_\mathrm{e} A_\mathrm{m}} {l_\mathrm{e} l_\mathrm{m}}$$

where

G is the goodness factor (factors above 1 are likely to be efficient)
A_{e}, A_{m} are the cross sections of the electric and magnetic circuits
l_{e}, l_{m} are the lengths of the electric and magnetic circuits
μ is the permeability of the core
ω is the angular frequency the motor is driven at
σ is the conductivity of the conductor

From this he showed that the most efficient motors are likely to be relatively large. However, the equation only directly relates to non-permanent magnet motors.

Laithwaite showed that for a simple induction motor this gave:

$$G \propto \frac {\omega \mu_0 p^2} {\rho_\mathrm{r} g}$$

where p is the pole pitch arc length, ρ_{r} is the surface resistivity of the rotor and g is the air gap.
