= Tracked Hovercraft =

British experimental train

Coordinates: 52.38964°N 0.082397°E

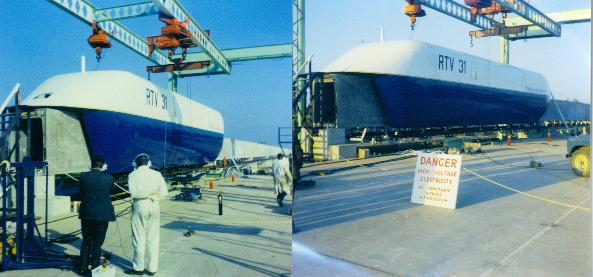
The RTV 31 at Earith, Cambridgeshire, during testing in May 1973

Tracked Hovercraft was an experimental high-speed train developed in the United Kingdom during the 1960s. It combined two British inventions, the hovercraft and the linear induction motor, in an effort to produce a train system that would provide 250 mph (400 km/h) inter-city service with lowered capital costs compared to other high-speed solutions. Substantially similar to the French Aérotrain and other hovertrain systems of the 1960s, Tracked Hovercraft suffered a fate similar to those of the other projects when it was cancelled as a part of wide budget cuts in 1973.

== History ==
=== Genesis at Hovercraft Development ===
It was noticed early on in the development of the hovercraft that the energy needed to lift a vehicle was directly related to the smoothness of the surface on which it travelled. This was not entirely surprising; the air trapped under the hovercraft will remain there except where it leaks out where the lifting surface contacts the ground – if this interface is smooth, the amount of leaked air will be low. This is the purpose of the skirt found on most hovercraft; it allows the fuselage to be some distance from the ground while keeping the air gap as small as possible.

The surprising discovery was that the energy needed to move a vehicle using hover technology could be lower than the same vehicle on steel wheels, at least at high speeds. Over 140 mph (230 km/h), conventional trains suffered from a problem known as hunting oscillation that forces the flanges on the sides of the wheels to hit the rail with increasing frequency, dramatically increasing rolling resistance. Although the energy needed to keep a hovercraft in motion also increased with speed, this increase was slower than the sudden (and sometimes catastrophic) increase due to hunting. That implied that for travel above some critical speed, a hovercraft could be more efficient than a wheeled vehicle running on the same route.

Furthermore, this vehicle would also retain all of the positive qualities of a hovercraft. Small imperfections in the surface would have no effect on the ride quality, and the complexity of the suspension system could be greatly reduced. Additionally, since the load is spread out over the surface of the lifting pads, the pressure on the running surface is greatly reduced – about 1/10,000 the pressure of a train wheel, about 1/20 of the pressure of a rubber tyre on a road. These two properties meant that the running surface could be considerably simpler than the surface needed to support the same vehicle on wheels; hovertrains could be supported on surfaces similar to existing light-duty roadways, instead of the much more complex and expensive railbeds needed to support the weight on two rails. This could greatly reduce infrastructure capital costs.

In 1960 several engineers at Christopher Cockerell's Hovercraft Development Ltd. in Hythe, Hampshire, began early studies on the hovertrain concept. At the time, a major problem was selecting a suitable power source. As the hovercraft had no strong contact with a running surface, propulsion was normally provided by an aircraft-like solution, typically a large propeller. This limits the acceleration as well as the efficiency of the system, a major limitation for a design concept that would compete with aircraft on the same routes.

=== Introducing the LIM ===
Through the same period, Eric Laithwaite had been developing the linear induction motor (LIM) at the University of Manchester. By 1961 he had built a small demonstration system consisting of a 20-foot-long (6.1 m) LIM reaction plate and a four-wheeled cart with a seat on top. In 1962 he started consulting with British Rail (BR) on the idea of using LIMs for high-speed trains. A November 1961 Popular Science article shows his Hovertrain concept using a LIM; the accompanying illustration shows small lift pads like those from the Ford Levapad concept, running on top of conventional rails. After moving to Imperial College London in 1964, Laithwaite was able to devote more time to this work and perfect the first working examples of large LIMs suitable for transport systems.

LIMs provide traction through the interaction of magnetic fields generated on the vehicle and a fixed external conductor. The external conductor was normally made of plates of aluminium, chosen due to its high conductivity in relation to its price. The active portion of the motor consists of a conventional electric motor winding stretched out under the vehicle. When the motor windings are energised, an opposing magnetic field is induced in the nearby reaction plate, which causes the two to repel each other. By moving the fields down the windings, the motor pushes itself along the plate with the same force that is normally used to create rotation in a conventional motor. A LIM eliminates the need for strong physical contact with the track, requiring instead a strong reaction plate. It has no moving parts, a major advantage over conventional traction.

In Laithwaite's original designs, known as double-sided sandwich motors, two sets of windings were used, positioned a few centimetres apart. They were positioned so that the aluminium stator plate would fit in the gap between the windings, sandwiching it between them. The advantage to this layout is that the forces pulling one set of windings toward the plate are balanced by the opposite forces in the other set. By attaching the two sets of windings to a common frame, all of the forces are internalised.

=== Hovertrain ===
The Hovercraft Development team quickly picked up on the LIM concept as well. Their initial solution was a track shaped like an upside-down T, with the vertical portion consisting of a central concrete section with aluminium stator plates fixed on either side. Their first design concept looked like the fuselage of an airliner with two decks, riding above the stator beam, with the LIM centred in the middle of the body. Four pads provided lift, arranged two on a side fore and aft and riding on the horizontal surface of the guideway. Four more pads, above the lift pads, were rotated vertically to press against the centre beam and kept the craft centred. A test rig of this layout was built at Hythe, which was filmed in operation by British Pathé in 1963, which also showed a model of the proposed full-sized version.

As development of the testbed design continued at HDL, the problem of high-speed loads on the guideway became obvious. In spite of its light weight compared to conventional train sets, the Tracked Hovercraft operated at such high speeds that its passage induced vibration modes in the guideway that needed to be damped out. This was a relatively new field for the civil engineers that were working on the guideway design, as their field was more generally concerned with static loads. The train layout was redesigned with a box-like main girder, with a top-mounted reaction plate being used for the LIM, and the vertical sides of the guideway being used for centring. Wing-like extensions extended down from the body of the train and covered the centring pads. A version with this layout was built as a scale model at Hythe, and featured in another Pathé film in 1966. This version was shown at Hovershow '66.

A further modification produced a guideway that looked like a rightside-up T, although the vertical section was a trapezoidal girder almost as wide as the top of the T. The reaction plate for the LIM was moved to the underside of the horizontal portion of the T on one side, extending vertically down, while the other side contained the electrical conductors that provided power. In such an arrangement, rain, snow and debris would simply fall off the plates. The new guideway design was simulated at the Atlas Computer Laboratory. This work included the generation of films showing the vehicle in-action, using a Stromberg-Carlson SC4020 microfilm recorder.

=== Laithwaite joins ===
While the hovertrain was being developed, BR was running an extensive research project on the topic of high-speed wheeled trains at their newly opened British Rail Research Division in Derby. This was the first group to characterise the hunting oscillation in detail. Their work clearly suggested that careful design of the suspension system could eliminate the problem. This would allow high-speed trains to be built using conventional steel-wheel technology.

Although high-speed travel would require new lines to be laid, expensive ones, such a train could use existing rail infrastructure at lower speeds. This would allow such a train to approach existing stations at lower speeds, greatly reducing capital costs of bringing the service into cities. The inter-city sections could be re-laid for higher speeds, where the infrastructure costs were generally lower anyway. BR also showed that the capital cost advantages of the hovertrain concept were offset by the higher vehicle costs; the tracked hovercraft concept made sense for a smaller number of vehicles or longer lines where the capital costs were concentrated in the tracks, but neither of these characterised BR's operations.

Meanwhile, having exhausted their research abilities using small models, the Hovercraft Development team had been petitioning their parent organisation, the National Research Development Corporation (NRDC), for additional funding to build a full-sized test track. NDRC was unsuccessful in raising new capital from the government and decided to put in £1 million from their own pre-assigned discretionary budget to start construction of a track, hoping that additional funding would be forthcoming from industry.

On 1 April 1967, Hovercraft Development was officially transferred to National Physical Laboratory. Seeking to protect their investment, and finding little external funding, the NRDC decided to spin off the hovertrain group as Tracked Hovercraft Ltd. (THL). They also decided to spool out the funding over four years, starting with a £1 million grant for a single prototype vehicle and a short portion of the test track. Although this funding was enough only for the first stage of a track, the NRDC suggested it would be quite useful for testing low-speed intra-urban versions of the concept.

Frustrated with BR's lack of interest in his hovertrain work, and their lack of funding, in 1967 Laithwaite severed his ties with BR and joined Tracked Hovercraft as a consultant. By this time the French government had started providing major funding for Jean Bertin's Aérotrain project, which was substantially similar to the Tracked Hovercraft in concept. Laithwaite, always described as persuasive, convinced the government that they were about to lose out on this burgeoning field of high-speed transit, and eventually won £2 million in additional funding.

=== RTV 31 ===
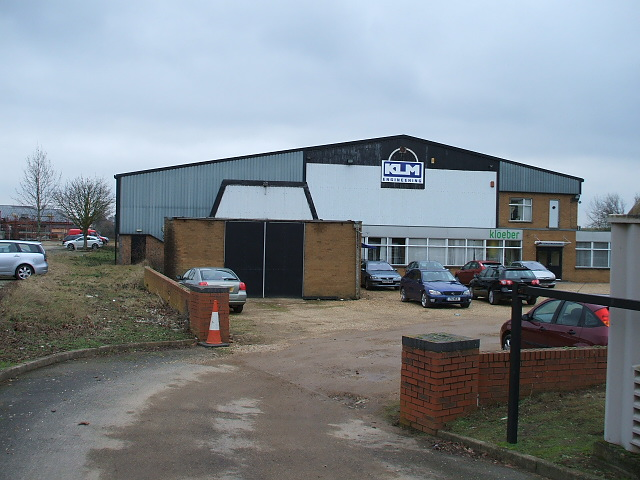
This building was formerly the hangar used by RTV 31, now used by an engineering firm. The guideway ran out of the far end of the building, curving to meet the Old Bedford River at the right, out of view.

By the time construction was preparing to start in 1970, a new problem had appeared. Prior to construction most LIMs were test systems that had operated at low speeds, but as the speeds increased it was noticed that the mechanical forces of the LIM windings on the stator plate gave rise to a serious safety issue. Magnetic forces vary with the cube of distance, so any change in distance between the motor and stator plate caused it to be pulled more strongly to the closer side. At high speeds, the forces involved were so great that it was possible for the stator plate to crack along vertical joins in the plates, at which point it could strike the motor, or portions of the vehicle behind the crack point. Even without an outright failure, any mechanical motion in the plate due to the forces of the passing train could induce waves in the stator that travelled along with it. If the vehicle then decelerated these waves could catch up with it. Additionally, the passing of the train heated the plate, potentially weakening it mechanically. Laithwaite concluded that the double-sided LIM was "far too dangerous" to use.

Most systems using LIMs – there were dozens by this point – redesigned their tracks to use a single-sided LIM over a stator plate lying flat between the rails. This led to another redesign of the Hovertrain guideway as a square box girder with the LIM stator attached flat on the top of the box, and the electrical pick-ups below on either side of it. Power pick-ups extended from the rear of the vertical wing-like surfaces on either side of the vehicle, and the sparks they threw during operation are easily visible on test runs.

Starting in the 1970s, construction of test track started in the fens at Earith in Cambridgeshire, supported by Tracked Hovercraft Ltd offices in Ditton Walk in Cambridge city. The track was about 6 feet (1.8 m) off the ground, running along the earthworks between the Old Bedford River and the Counter Drain just to its north, between Earith and the Denver Sluice. The first 4-mile (6.4 km) long section of the planned 20-mile (32 km) long track was laid to Sutton-in-the-Isle. Along the full 20-mile (32 km) length it was expected the train would reach 300 mph (480 km/h).

On 7 February 1973 the first test train, Research Test Vehicle 31, or RTV 31, reached 104 mph (167 km/h) on a 1-mile (1.6 km) section, in spite of the short track and a 20 mph (32 km/h) headwind. The test was heavily publicised and shown on BBC news throughout the day. Much of the interest stemmed from rumours that the project was facing imminent cancellation. Aerospace Minister Michael Heseltine sent Michael McNair-Wilson to view the test. Heseltine said in an interview that he believed that the project would not be cancelled.

=== Stiff competition ===
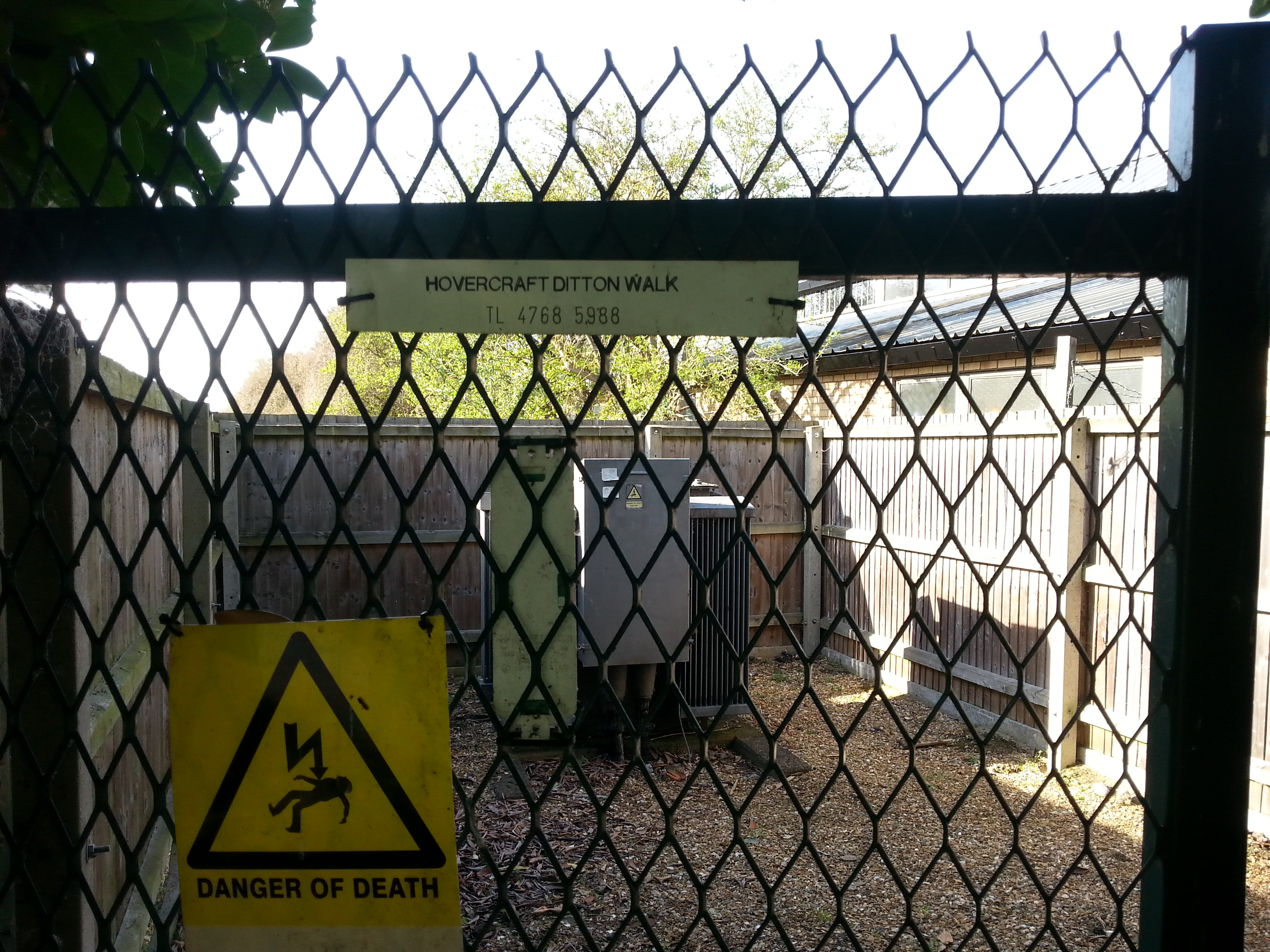
Electrical substation at Ditton Walk Cambridge, which was installed to provide enough power for Hovertrain engineering experiments in the 1970s

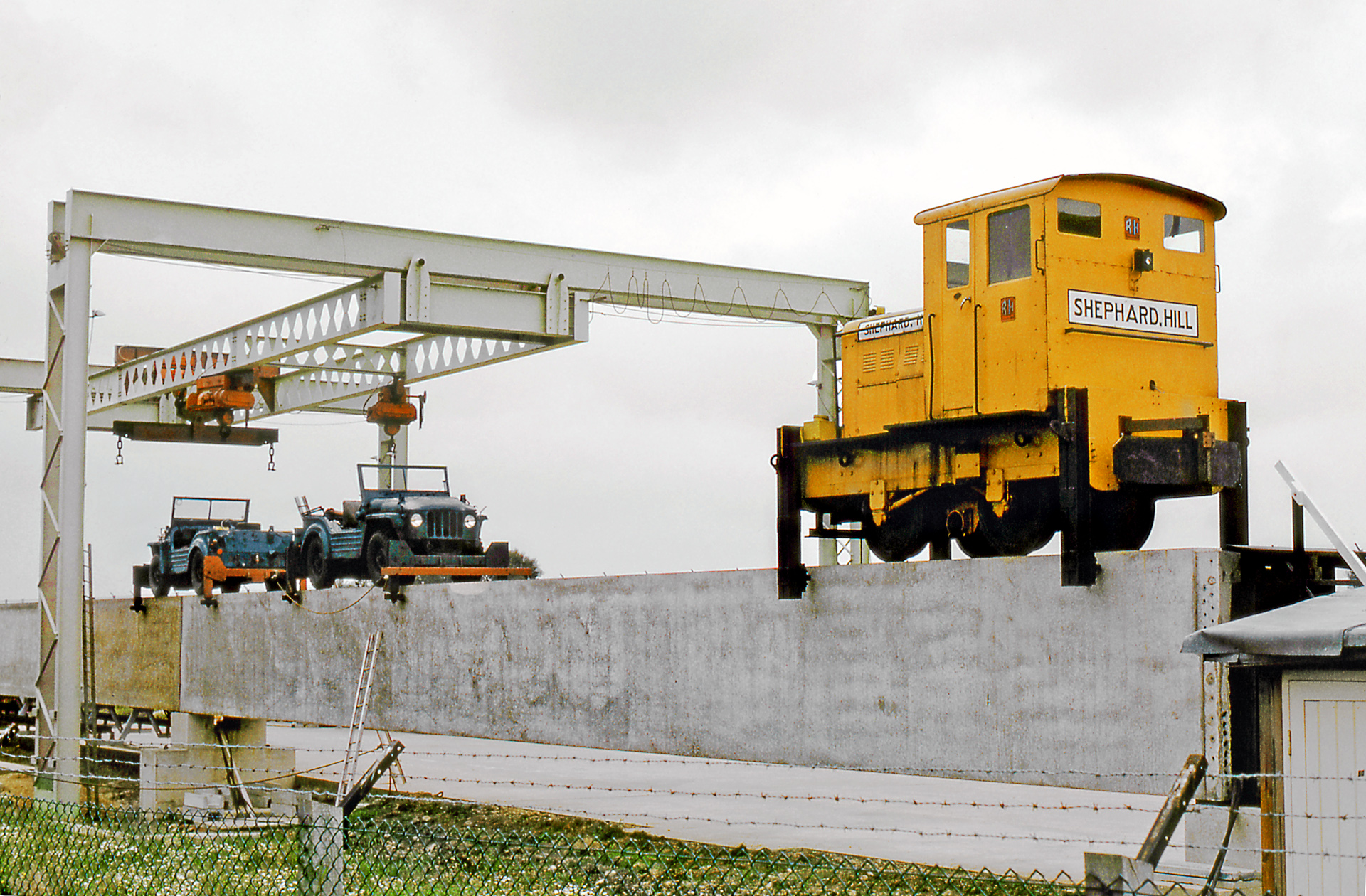
Service vehicles for the Tracked Hovercraft on the "rail", including the former ED10 converted to 3' gauge, and two Austin Champ jeeps equipped with guidance wheels

By the time construction started on Tracked Hovercraft's test track, British Rail was well advanced on their plans for the steel-wheeled Advanced Passenger Train (APT). The government found itself in the position of funding two different high-speed train systems whose proponents were quick to point out problems in the competing system. To gain some clarity, they formed an interdepartmental working party that studied several potential inter-city transit solutions on the London–Manchester and London–Glasgow routes. The options included 'buses, Advanced Passenger Train, Tracked Hovercraft, and VTOL and STOL aircraft. Their December 1971 report strongly favoured APT. (Note: At least according to Alan Wickens, the former Director Advanced Projects, Research Department of the British Railways Board. See Wickens.)

The arguments eventually settled on the need to build new lines. APT was intended to enter testing in 1973, and enter pay service before the end of the 1970s. In comparison, Tracked Hovercraft would not be ready for real-world testing until the late 1970s, and could not enter service until a completely new set of guideways had been constructed. Arguments in favour of TH included the problem that placing APT on existing lines would simply increase congestion on them, and that its 155 mph (249 km/h) speed was simply too low to compete directly with jet aircraft, unlike the 250 mph (402 km/h) TH. If new lines were going to be laid, TH would cost about £250,000 a mile, compared to the £500,000 spent during the same period by Deutsche Bundesbahn to increase performance of its existing rail lines to only 100 mph (161 km/h). This was all taking place even while many of the "more complacent elements" of British Rail were dismissing the need for any form of high-speed rail.

Another serious concern was the rapid development and apparent superiority of the competing maglev concept. A study by THL noted that air drag on a canonical 40-long ton 100-passenger hovercraft at 400 km/h (250 mph) with a (considerable) 70 km/h (43 mph) crosswind would absorb 2,800 kW (3,800 hp). This is not a particularly great amount of power; a commuter STOL aircraft of similar size would likely require two to three times as much power in cruise – the Vickers Viscount carried 75 passengers and equipped with a total of 6,000 kW (8,000 hp) for take-off and operated around 4,000 to 5,000 kW (5,400 to 6,700 hp) in cruise.

Of much greater concern was the need to take in air for the hover pads, accelerating it from ambient to vehicle speed before being pumped into the pads. This load, which THL referred to as momentum drag, accounted for a further 2,100 kW (2,800 hp). The combined 4,900 kW (6,600 hp) was not unheard of; existing freight locomotives of similar power were already in use. However, these weighed 80 tons, much of it for the voltage control and conversion equipment, which would be far too heavy for the lightweight TH. THL's solution was to move the power supplies to the trackside and use them to power individual sections of the track as the vehicle passed, but this was at the great expense of requiring such equipment to be distributed along the line.

In general terms, the maglev simply replaced the hover pads with electromagnets. Removing the motors and fans and replacing the pads with magnets reduced vehicle weight by about 15%. This change meant that the relatively low payload fraction of the hovercraft was greatly increased, as much as doubling it. But much more important was that there was no need to ingest and accelerate air to feed into the pads, which eliminated 2,100 kW (2,800 hp) and replaced it by the power needed to operate the magnets, estimated to be as little as 40 kW (54 hp). This meant that the Tracked Hovercraft found itself squeezed between the zero-energy lift system of the steel-wheeled APT and the low-energy lift system of the maglev, leaving no role that one of those systems didn't better serve.

=== Cancellation ===
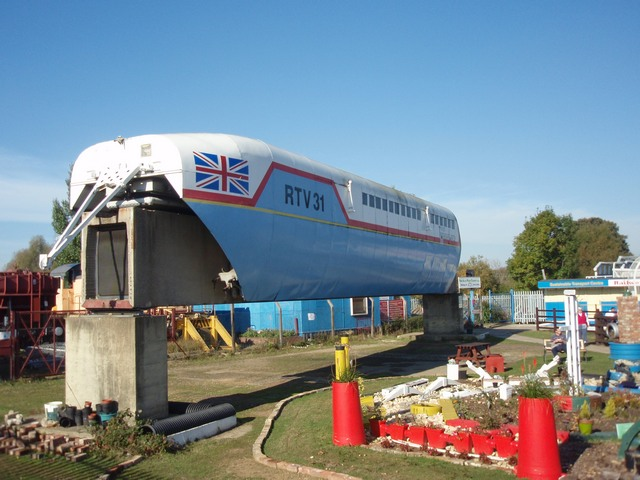
All that remains of the Tracked Hovercraft test system, the RTV 31 test vehicle and a single portion of its guideway preserved at Railworld Wildlife Haven near Peterborough. One of the lifting pads can be seen at the extreme rear, just under the tow bar. One of the centring pads can be seen at the rear of the vertical skirt.

Only a week after McNair-Wilson's comments at the run in February 1973, funding for the Tracked Hovercraft project was cancelled. Heseltine noted problems with the concept, stated that there was no prospect of a system being installed before 1985, and very limited possibilities between then and the end of the century. He stated that further funding, already to the tune of £5 million by this point, made no sense at that time. Work on the LIM would continue to be funded, however, and the Department of Trade and Industry signed a £500,000 contract with Hawker Siddeley to carry on LIM development.

Heseltine was accused by Airey Neave and others of earlier misleading the House of Commons when he stated that the government was still considering giving financial support to the hovertrain, when the decision to pull the plug must have already been taken by the cabinet. He called together the Select Committee on Science and Technology to examine the issue, but they were constantly frustrated in their efforts to obtain cabinet meeting reports. One thing that did surface was that Hawker Siddeley and Tracked Hovercraft were in the process of entering a bid for the GO-Urban system in Toronto, Ontario. This was for the LIM technology, which Hawker Siddeley was proposing to combine with their rubber-tired Hawker Siddeley Minitram system. The GO-Urban contest was eventually won by a low-speed maglev, the Krauss-Maffei Transurban, a choice that occurred while the committee was meeting.

Laithwaite was as publicly critical of the government's cancellation as he had been of BR's earlier efforts on LIM research. However, by this time he had distanced himself from the hovercraft arrangement, concluding that the maglev was a better solution. Laithwaite had found that careful arrangement of the LIM allowed a single motor to act as both the lift and traction system, a system he called "traverse-flux", or "river of magnetism". Having continued his research at Derby throughout, when it became clear that Tracked Hovercraft was truly dead, Laithwaite started pushing for the test track to be converted to a testbed for his maglev design. By that point Rohr, Inc. in the US were already experimenting with their own LIM arrangement of this sort on their ROMAG personal rapid transport system, and there were several German maglev efforts underway as well. In the end the TH test track was abandoned. Laithwaite's work would eventually be used as the basis for the Birmingham Maglev, the first operational maglev system.

=== Fate ===
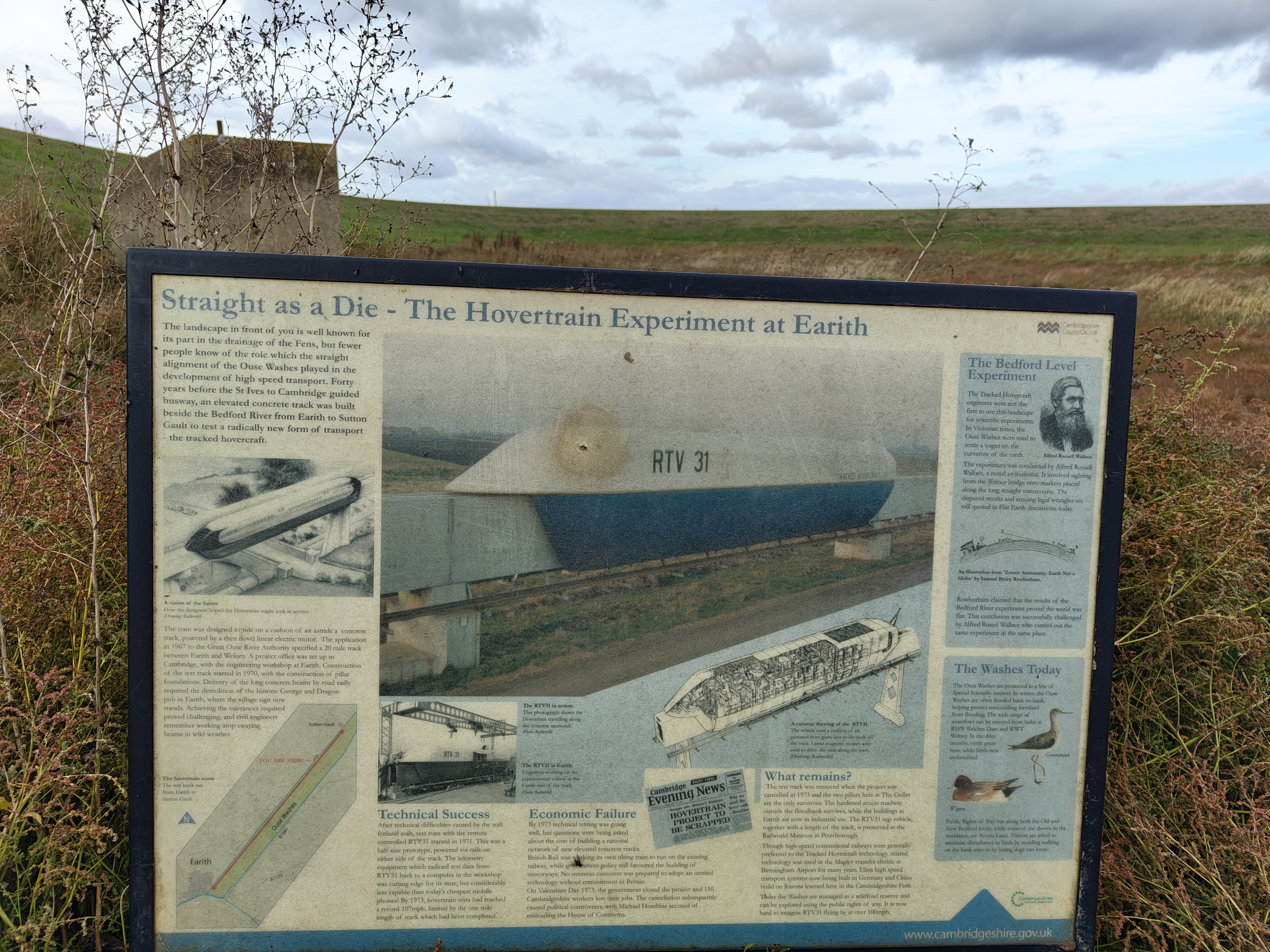
A sign near Earith, giving information about the Tracked Hovercraft experiment. One of the concrete footings is visible in the background.

RTV 31 ended up at Cranfield University where it was kept in the open for more than 20 years. In 1996 it was donated to Railworld, where it was later restored and set up as a main display in front of the buildings. The test track was removed, but several concrete footings project, at ground level, from a small pond beside the Counter Drain. The course of the track itself can be seen in aerial photography, as it has been re-used as a dirt road. Further along the river bank, the engineering shed survives at Earith. The only surviving evidence of the offices in Ditton Walk, Cambridge is an electrical substation named "Hovercraft", which was installed to support the high-power electrical research work there.

The beam on which the RTV 31 is resting has been condemned, and the structural integrity of the vehicle itself has weakened. As of July 2025, side panels are being removed so it can be assessed whether it can be lifted down safely, which will probably have to happen in parts.

Many original documents from the Tracked Hovercraft project are stored within the Hovercraft Museum library in Hampshire, England, including technical documents, video footage reels, press books and blueprints. A scale model of the RTV 31, a working miniature LIM, photographs, video footage and archive documents are kept within the Museum. Another scale model of the RTV 31 is kept within the museum at Railworld Wildlife Haven.

== See also ==
- Hyperloop
- Ground-effect train
- Maglev (transport)
- Aérotrain
