= Railworld Wildlife Haven =

Railway museum in Peterborough, England

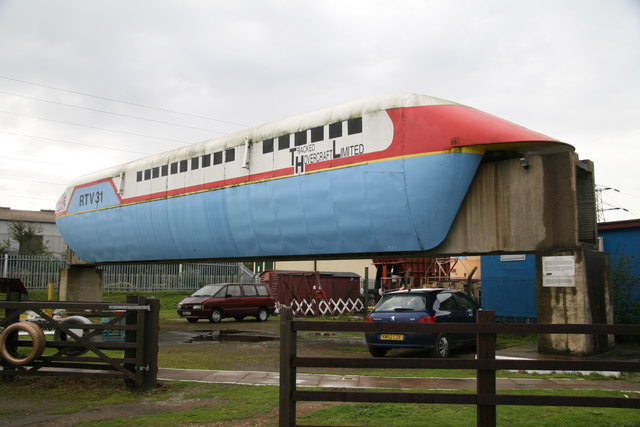
- The Tracked Hovercraft RTV 31
- Established: 1985
- Location: Peterborough, England
- Coordinates: 52°34′4.50″N 0°14′53.00″W
- Type: Charity
- Director: Brian Pearce
- Parking: On site
- Website: Official website

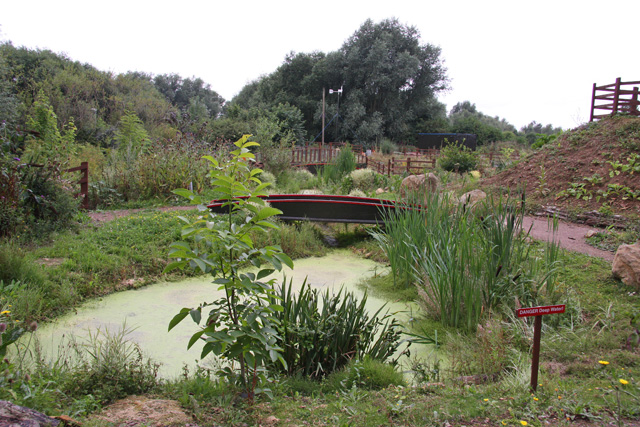
"Railworld Wildlife Haven"

Railworld Wildlife Haven is a charity in Peterborough which has a nature haven, a model railway and other exhibits. It is located on a landscaped former coal storage yard which once served Peterborough Power Station.

It was founded by Rev. Richard Paten (1932-2012) in 1985 as the "Museum of World Railways" (MWR), changing its name to "Railworld" in 1992 and is now called "Railworld Wildlife Haven" in reference to its change of focus towards its landscaped nature area. The centre is open only on certain days. It is located beside the Peterborough Nene Valley railway station, but it is a separate organisation.

== Exhibits ==
In reference to its previous function as a railway museum, there is a small collection of locomotives and railway memorabilia, all of which require extensive work. There are two unique vehicles:

- Tracked Hovercraft RTV 31, a prototype hover train which was tested in the Cambridgeshire Fens.
- The Birmingham AirRail Link Maglev vehicle.

Other locomotive are:

- American Alco S1 switcher diesel locomotive numbers 801 & 804. 804 was one of the five locomotives built by the American Locomotive Company for the Steel Company of Wales works at Margam. After vandalism and vital parts were stolen, including all the copper radiators and wheel bearings, the Alco was dismantled for spares (another Alco is at NVR's Overton Station), while the frames were scrapped in 2021.
- Danish Pacific Vauclain compound, DSB No. 996 built by Frichs in the 1950s.
