= Crayons to Classrooms =

American charitable organization

- Founded: 2008
- Type: 501(c)(3) charity
- Purpose: Children's education
- Location: Dayton, Ohio, US
- Key people: Executive Director Steve Rubenstein
- Website: www.dc2c.org

Crayons to Classrooms is a Dayton, Ohio 501(c)(3) charity providing free school supplies to area students who cannot otherwise afford them. The organization functions as a free store for teachers of under-served children, stocking basic needs such as notebooks, pencils and pens, and art supplies for Kindergarten through Grade 12 classrooms. The charity in affiliated with the Kids In Need Foundation.

Crayons to Classrooms aims to lay the foundation for academic success by ensuring that students from low-income families have access to schoolwork essentials. Teachers from eligible schools may "shop" onsite at no charge for basics that children need for learning, all donated and assembled in partnership with local businesses, individuals and volunteers.

To qualify for free classroom supplies, teachers must represent schools having at least 70% of students enrolled in the National School Lunch Program (NSLP). In the Dayton area, approximately 1,400 teachers from 85 schools are candidates, serving as many as 23,000 students.

== History ==
Crayons to Classrooms opened to teachers January 15, 2009 after 3 years of research and planning. A 2006 study by Dayton civic leaders identified useful classroom "free store" models across the US. With this learning experience as a base, and the Mathile Family Foundation and The Dayton Foundation providing seed money, Crayons to Classrooms was established as a registered non-profit in 2008. A partnership with Goodwill Easter Seals Miami Valley secured the organization a generous physical plant, plus pick-up of donated products. Today Crayons to Classrooms operates in 12,000 square feet (1,100 m^{2}) of shopping, warehouse, and office space inside the Goodwill Easter Seals building, though separate from it, in north Dayton.

== Programs ==
Crayons to Classrooms employs several programs to collect essential school supplies for under-served children:

=== C4C Supply Drive Program ===
C4C Supply Drive Program seeks business and community sponsors for drives to gather donated or surplus supplies. Crayons to Classrooms promotes the drives and provides collection bins and services.

=== School Box Program ===
School Box Program links corporate or individual donors with specific under-served classrooms, providing them with grade-appropriate kits full of new, brand-name supplies. These range from crayons and glue sticks for K and elementary use to calculators, dictionaries and more for grades 6-12.

=== Classroom Solutions ===
Classroom Solutions, a collaborative program with Goodwill Easter Seals Miami Valley, utilizes die-cut forms produced by Goodwill's Work Experience Program—numerals and letters, geometric shapes, etc.—as classroom learning aids. Donations such as felt, plastics, and cardboard are the raw materials for this program.
