= Helen Jamet =

Medical entomologist

Helen Jamet FRES
- Education: University of Leeds (BSc); London School of Hygiene and Tropical Medicine (MSc, PhD)
- Scientific career
- Workplaces: London School of Hygiene and Tropical Medicine, American Biophysics Corporation Vestergaard Frandsen, Bill & Melinda Gates Foundation

Helen Jamet FRES is a medical entomologist from the UK, she is deputy director for Vector Control of Malaria at the Bill & Melinda Gates Foundation.

== Education and career ==
Jamet did a BSc in Applied Biology at the University of Leeds graduating in 1994 and then a Master of Science in Medical Parasitology in 1996 and a PhD in Infectious Diseases at the London School of Hygiene and Tropical Medicine where she graduated in 2002. She stayed and worked as a research fellow for two years at the LSHTM and then worked as a consultant medical entomologist for the American Biophysics Corporation, testing mosquito traps in the field in Tanzania.

Jamet worked for Vestergaard Frandsen from 2007 to 2018 where she was Project Manager, Head of Entomology and finally global head of Research & Market Access.

== Research ==
At Vestergaard Jamet helped to develop the first next-generation long lasting insecticide treated bed nets which have two compounds, an insecticide and a synergist Piperonyl butoxide to enhance the action of the insecticide on the mosquito, blocking the enzymes in the mosquito that break down the insecticide.

Her work has also involved compiling data on the effectiveness of insectides against malaria vectors, to see which control methods are needed and map where resistance might be developing; she is also involved in looking for new pesticide compounds that can kill mosquitoes through novel biological mechanisms

== Honours and awards ==
Jamet is a Fellow of the Royal Entomological Society and of the Royal Society of Tropical Medicine and Hygiene.
