= Ido Leffler =

Israeli-Australian entrepreneur (born 1977)

- עידו לפלר
- Born: 19 July 1977 (age 49); Israel
- Education: University of Technology Sydney
- Occupations: Entrepreneur, Advisor, Investor
- Years active: 1999–present
- Organization(s): Emeritus Council Member United Nations Foundation Global Entrepreneurs; Young Presidents' Organization
- Television: Quit Your Day Job
- Board member of: Spark New Zealand; Non Executive Director; Asia Society; Vestergaard Frandsen; Board of trustees and Co-chair; Center for Global Education; Obvious Ventures, Advisor

Ido Leffler (Hebrew: עידו לפלר; born 19 July 1977) is an Israeli-born Australian entrepreneur, investor, and advisor. He is the co-founder of Yoobi, Yes To Inc., Cheeky, Brandless, and Beach House Group.

Each of the companies Leffler has founded and co-founded incorporates a social mission; Yoobi donates school supplies to children; Yes To Inc. provides nutrition resources for children in Africa; Cheeky and Brandless donate meals through Feeding America; and Beach House Group supports charities including KaBOOM, which funds playgrounds for children.

Leffler is the co-author of Get Big Fast and Do More Good: Start Your Business, Make It Huge, and Change the World, a guide to entrepreneurship and brand-building. He has invested in or advised companies including Birchbox, Dollar Shave Club, and RangeMe.

== Early life, education and early career ==
Leffler was born in Israel to Dan Leffler, an engineer and entrepreneur, and Yaffa Leffler, a school teacher. When he was five, the family emigrated to Sydney, where his father built a property development company. In 1993, as Australia hit a major recession, the residential market collapsed and the company failed. The Lefflers lost their life savings and their home.

Able to afford only the essentials, if Leffler "wanted to do anything – go to the movies, travel, buy something – it was up to him to figure out how to pay for it." In order to do so, he got a job at a grocery store, and then Psycho Chicken, a restaurant. At 18, he started his first business with his best friend, Evan Lever. Called the Roving Bakery, it was a home delivery service for breads and bagels.

To help make ends meet, while working full-time as a school teacher, Yaffa Leffler began a successful Herbalife distributorship. Dan Leffler joined her as the business grew. In 1996 Ido Leffler attended the University of Technology Sydney. He graduated with a bachelor of business degree in marketing and international business in 1999. He then decided to join his parents and became an Herbalife distributor in Indonesia and then in India.

== Career ==
=== Trendtrade International, Yes To Inc., SOMA Water ===
After returning from India, Leffler founded Trendtrade International with Lance Kalish, an alumnus of UTS whom Leffler met in 1997 through playing soccer. It focused on international business development. In 2006, they founded Yes To Inc., then known as Yes To Carrots. Based in Tel Aviv, the company produced and marketed organic hair and skincare products. The company name was derived from Leffler's philosophy: "Say yes to positivity." As of 2017, Yes To Inc. was sold in over 25,000 stores in the United States, Canada, and the UK.

In founding Yes To Inc., Leffler and Kalish established the Yes To Carrots Seed Fund, a non-profit organization that provided under-served communities with the resources to develop and sustain organic food sources and access to healthy nutrition. In 2012, the company partnered with Mama Hope to create Yes To Hope, which provided schools with funding for year-round organic gardens.

Leffler co-founded SOMA in 2012 and served as the chairman of its board until May 2017. A water filtration system composed of carafes and biodegradable filtration systems, SOMA donated clean drinking water to people in need through a philanthropic partner, charity: water.

=== Yoobi, Cheeky, Beach House Group, Brandless ===
Leffler and Kalish founded Yoobi in June 2014. A school and office supply brand, the idea for Yoobi was based on Leffler's experience shopping for school supplies for his children. He saw a "distinct lack of vision and creativity" in the products available. After learning that 99.5% of the elementary school teachers in the United States paid for classroom supplies out of their own pocket, Leffler and Kalish established a one-for-one system; each time a Yoobi product was purchased, an item such as crayons, pens, and rulers was added to a pack of school supplies which contained 1000 products. Yoobi worked with the Kids in Need Foundation to determine what students needed.

In 2014, Leffler co-founded Cheeky Home, a line of paper and plastic tableware. The company donated a meal to Americans facing hunger through the nonprofit organization Feeding America for every product sold. He also co-founded Beach House Group, a brand and product development company. Beach House Group supports Clean the World, Girl Up, Kaboom and Starlight Children's Foundation.

Leffler founded Brandless with Tina Sharkey in early 2014. Described by Fortune as the "Procter and Gamble for millennials," the company creates and sells organic and natural products. For every order placed at Brandless.com a meal is donated through Feeding America. Brandless launched in July 2017, raised $240mm from Softbank in June 2018 and closed in February 2020.

=== Collapse of Purely Byron ===
Leffler was a director of Purely Byron, the business founded by Elsa Pataky. He cited the troubles of major shareholder BWX as the reason behind the bankruptcy.

== Other ventures ==
In 2016, Leffler appeared as a judge on the Oxygen television series Quit Your Day Job. A reality show which allowed entrepreneurs to pitch their business ideas to the panel of entrepreneurs and investors, Quit Your Day Job focused on women and minority entrepreneurs.

Leffler and Kalish wrote a guide to modern entrepreneurship, Get Big Fast and Do More Good, published by Harcourt in 2014. Kalish and Leffler described the book as "very simply, operating a business in an ethical, moral way with equal regard to our consumers, our partners, the environment and the well-being of everyone involved in the production of our products."

He is an investor in and advisor for a wide variety of startups and established companies, and serves on the board of directors for Spark New Zealand.

== Personal life, philanthropy, and recognition ==
Leffler lives in Melbourne, Australia with his wife and their three children. He is a member of the Melbourne branch of the Young Presidents' Organization, and serves as a trustee for the Asia Society and as a co-chair of their Center for Global Education. He is an emeritus council member of the United Nations Foundation Global Entrepreneurs.

Leffler received the 2017 Retail Innovator Award from Retail Touch Points and the UTS Alumni Award for Excellence by the UTS Business School. He won the 2015 Chancellor's Award for Excellence, and the Starlight Foundation's 2015 Innovator Award, which recognizes individuals and corporations who have made significant contributions to communities with the goal of promoting positive social impact. He was also named one of Fast Company's "Most Creative People."
