= Shervin Pishevar =

Iranian-American entrepreneur and investor (born 1974)

- شروین پيشه ور
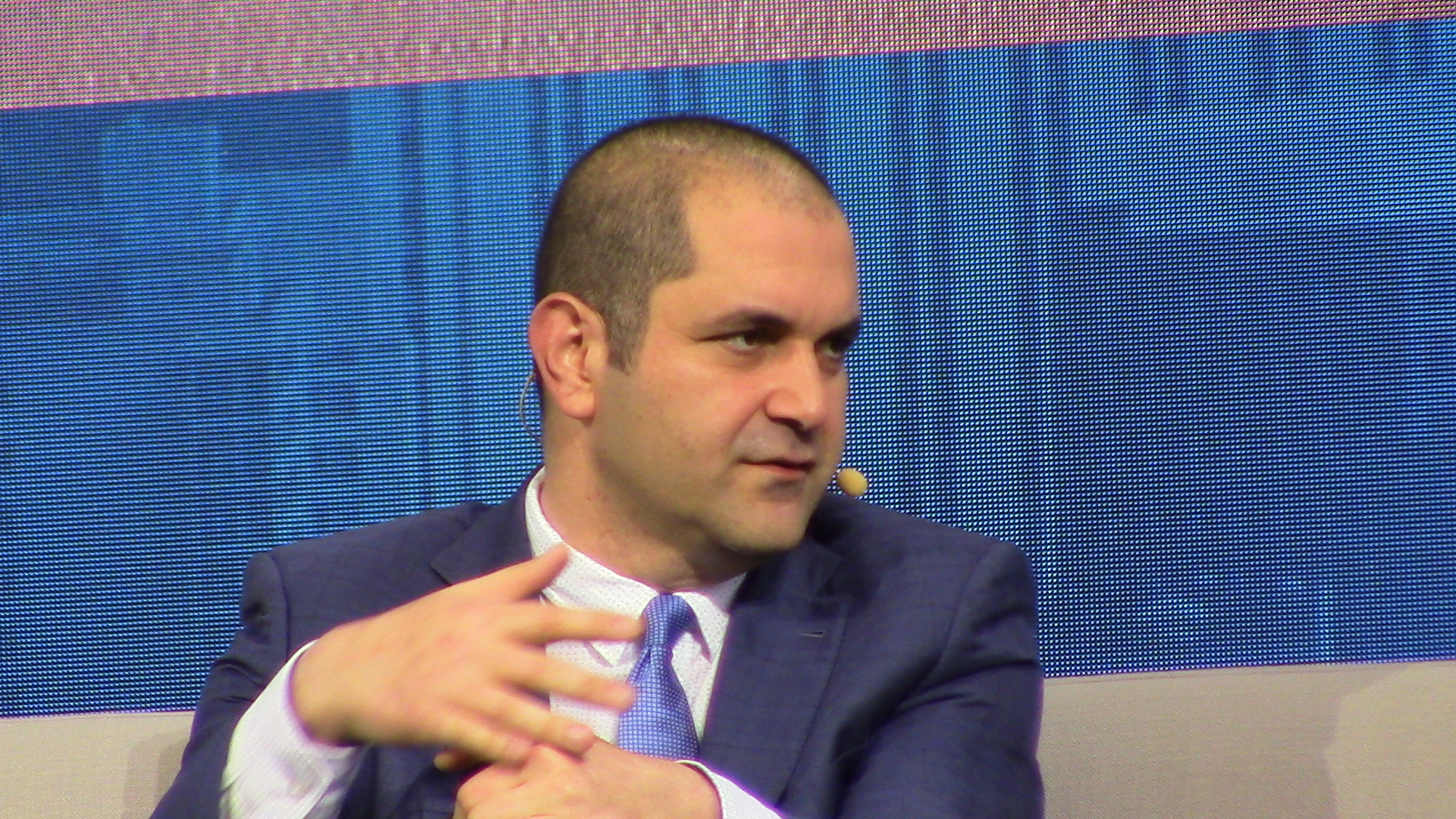
- Born: Shervin Kordary Pishevar; March 24, 1974 (age 52); Tehran, Iran
- Citizenship: United States
- Education: University of California, Berkeley
- Occupations: Entrepreneur; venture capitalist; super angel investor

Shervin Kordary Pishevar (Persian: شروین پیشه ور; born March 24, 1974) is an Iranian-American entrepreneur, venture capitalist, super angel investor, and philanthropist. He is the co-founder and former executive chairman of Hyperloop One and a co-founder and managing director of Sherpa Capital, a venture capital fund that has invested in Airbnb, Uber, Gopuff, Slack, Robinhood, Munchery, Postmates, and other companies.

As an angel investor, Pishevar has seeded more than 60 companies. He was previously a managing director at Menlo Ventures, where he led investments in Warby Parker, Tumblr, Machine Zone, and Uber Series B. He is a strategic advisor to Uber, and served as a board observer to the company from 2011 to 2015. He founded and operated technology-enabled companies including webs.com, WebOS, SGN, and HyperOffice.

Beginning in 2011, he served a two-year term as a member of the 10-person UN Foundation's Global Entrepreneurs Council. He was chosen by the U.S. government as an Outstanding American by Choice in 2012, and in 2015 he was appointed by Barack Obama to the J. William Fulbright Foreign Scholarship Board. An American citizen of Iranian descent, Pishevar received an Ellis Island Medal of Honor in 2016.

== Early life and education ==
Shervin Pishevar was born in Tehran, Iran, the son of Abraham Pishevar, a television and radio executive, and Eshrat (Kordary) Pishevar. Abraham moved to the United States after he was placed on Ayatollah Khomeini's execution list for broadcasting instructions on leaving Iran for foreign nationals. He became a cab driver in Silver Spring, Maryland, where he was joined by his family 18 months later. While driving the cab, Pishevar, who already held a master's degree, earned a Ph.D. in Mass Communication at Howard University.

Shervin Pishevar attended Montgomery Blair High School, where he studied in the math and science magnet program. As a junior, he won election as the student member of the Montgomery County Board of Education. He pushed to create a $10 education tax to county taxpayers and to donate student projects from auto mechanics and woodworking classes to charity. Encouraged by his parents to pursue a career in medicine, he began researching Magainin peptides at Blair. Later, while majoring in molecular cellular biology at UC Berkeley, he received a Presidential Fellowship to continue the study. In 1996, he co-wrote an article in Journal of the American Medicine Society that helped lead to the Istanbul Protocol, the first set of international guidelines for documentation of torture.

As a senior at Berkeley, Pishevar founded and served as editor-in-chief of Berkeley Scientific, the first peer-reviewed undergraduate research journal in the United States. He completed more than a year of graduate courses in health economics at the Berkeley School of Public Health.

== Career ==
=== 1997–2004 ===
Rather than go into a medical profession, Pishevar decided to become an entrepreneur. At 23, he founded WebOS, the first company to create cross-browser windows-like interfaces for the internet, establishing the concept of a Web-based operating system. In a 1999 article in the Financial Times, Pishevar called WebOS "disruptive technology", and predicted that it would change the dominant distribution of channels for software. In the same article, Pishevar was described as "Bill Gates' worst nightmare". Pishevar served as the company's CEO until 2001, when the company was dissolved. He and a co-founder retained the software, which became HyperOffice.

In 2001, Pishevar co-founded and served as a director of Seges Capital, an offshoot of the Vanderbilt University Technology Company (VUTC), the venture arm of Vanderbilt University's $2.5 billion endowment fund. In addition to fundraising for Seges, Pishevar helped manage 17 investments in early-stage companies. Also in 2001, Pishevar co-founded Ionside Interactive, and served as the company's president, director, and head of product, business development and sales. Creating an advanced 3D graphics and AI engine for the Pocket PC, Pishevar led the product development on several software titles. Additionally, Pishevar co-founded Application Corporation, which created the HyperOffice messaging and groupware suite.

=== 2005–2012 ===
In 2005, Pishevar was named founding president, COO, and board member for Webs Inc. (formerly Freewebs). Raising $12m for the company from Novak Biddle and Columbia Capital, Webs became one of the largest social publishing communities. Pishevar resigned his position at Webs to run SGN in 2008 and continued to serve on the company's board of directors until 2012.

Pishevar co-founded and served as the CEO of the Social Gaming Network (SGN) which was spun out of Webs in 2008. That same year, the company raised $15 million in Series A funding from investors including Greylock Capital Management, Founders Fund, Bezos Expeditions, Columbia Capital and Novak Biddle Venture Partners and raised a total of $18 million in funding before being acquired by MindJolt in 2011. At the time of the acquisition, Pishevar served as an executive chairman of SGN.

In 2010, he was appointed chief application officer and GM at Mozilla Corporation.

In 2011, Pishevar joined Menlo Ventures, a venture capital fund with over $4 billion under management, as a managing director. He led the fund's $26 million Series B Uber investment and became a board observer with the company in 2011. During his tenure with the company, he focused on social, consumer internet, and mobile areas, and served on the board or worked closely with companies including Machine Zone, Fab, and Warby Parker, and led Menlo's investment in Tumblr. Pishevar also helped launch the Menlo Talent Fund, a $20 million seed fund which invested in more than 35 seed stage companies.

=== 2013–present ===
==== Sherpa Capital ====
In 2013, Pishevar left his role as managing director at Menlo Ventures but remained as a venture advisor to the fund. After leaving the fund, he founded Sherpa Capital with Scott Stanford, formerly the co-head of Goldman Sachs' Global Internet Investment Banking division. The fund was created to serve as a venture capital company as well as an incubator and start-up advisory. The fund participated in its first investment in July 2013, when it co-led funding for the San Francisco-based BackOps, a SaaS provider for human resources, sales, finance and other back-office positions. The founders made additional investments and built a portfolio of investments with their private capital before seeking investors in the fund.

Sherpa closed a $154 million fund to back start-ups focused on consumer technology in July 2014. In July 2016, the company announced that it had raised $470 million for two new funds, Sherpa Ventures II, focused on early-stage investments and Sherpa Everest, a mid-stage fund. As of July 2017, investors had put nearly $640 million into Sherpa. In October 2017, it was reported that the company planned to raise $400 million for a new fund while it expanded its Silicon Foundry (formerly Sherpa Foundry) initiative to connect startups with larger companies. Sherpa Capital investments have also included Uber, Airbnb, Munchery, ipsy, Shyp, Stance, Rent the Runway, Beepi, PillPack, Doctor on Demand, and Cue Health, among others.

==== Uber ====
After departing Menlo Ventures in 2013, Pishevar joined Uber as a strategic advisor, and continued to serve as a board observer until 2015. As an Uber advisor and investor, Pishevar supported former Uber CEO Travis Kalanick. In August 2017, Pishevar and other investors formed the Uber Shareholder Alliance to remove Benchmark off of Uber's board of directors after the venture capital firm filed a lawsuit against Kalanick. Later that month, Pishevar and another Uber investor, Steve Russell, filed a motion to get the case against Kalanick dismissed and sent a letter to Benchmark accusing the it of violating its fiduciary duty as an investor of Uber and using a controversy to take control of the Uber's board. The case with Benchmark was eventually sent to arbitration by a Delaware judge.

In October 2017, the Uber board voted to reduce the power of investors with Class B common stocks, Pishevar called the move illegal and said the move affected the shareholder rights of more than 200 Uber employees and advisors.

==== Virgin Hyperloop One ====
In 2014, Pishevar responded to Elon Musk's challenge to build a hyperloop, which Musk presented in a whitepaper titled Hyperloop Alpha. In late 2014, Pishevar, Josh Giegel and Brogan BamBrogan co-founded Hyperloop One, formerly Hyperloop Technologies. Sherpa Capital led the first investment round for the company, raising $37 million. BamBrogan exited the company in July 2016.

In October 2017, the Richard Branson-led Virgin Group invested in Hyperloop One, as part of the investment the company was rebranded as Virgin Hyperloop One. In December 2017, Branson took control of the company after Pishevar resigned from both Virgin Hyperloop One and Sherpa Capital, due to multiple women accusing Pishevar of sexual misconduct including sexual harassment and unwelcome advances. Pishevar said he would be using the time off to investigate and pursue a legal case against the people who have instigated a smear campaign and the spreading of false allegations against his reputation.

=== Angel/seed investments ===
As an angel/seed investor, Pishevar has invested in over 60 companies, including Aardvark, CabanaApp (sold to Twitter), Dollar Shave Club (sold to Unilever), Cherry (sold to Lyft), Gowalla, Milo (sold to eBay), Kissmetrics, Klout, LikeALittle, RapGenius, Rapportive (sold to Linkedin), Rixty, SolveMedia, Taskrabbit, Tello, Postmates, Votizen and Qwiki.

== Activism ==
On January 27, 2011, following the Egyptian government's shutdown of the internet, Pishevar initiated the Open Mesh Project when he called for help create software that could turn laptops into low-cost Internet routers to form a 'mesh network'. That same year, he travelled to Egypt to see the Arab Spring protests.

In the United States, Pishevar has also been an advocate of the Startup Visa Act, which would create a new type of two-year visa available to immigrant entrepreneurs. In 2016, Pishevar proposed a mobile app that could share information between police officers and citizens during traffic stops before officers approached a stopped car in order to reduce the number of police shootings, and reduce the necessity of face-to-face contact for traffic stops.

== Political fundraising ==
He was a top fundraiser for both of Obama's presidential campaigns. In April 2016, a fundraising event to benefit Hillary Clinton's presidential campaign was hosted by George and Amal Clooney at Pishevar's home.

Following the results of the United States presidential election in 2016, it was reported that Pishevar publicly expressed support for a California independence movement and secession from the United States. He later clarified his position on the subject, stating that he envisioned a movement where California would exert more influence on national politics, and that he did not believe in secession.

He endorsed Donald Trump and donated to his presidential campaign in 2024.

== Allegations ==
On May 27, 2017, Pishevar was detained by the City of London Police after a woman alleged that she had been raped. He was questioned and released under investigation. City Police closed the investigation after a few weeks, citing a lack of evidence, Pishevar was cleared and "de-arrested" in July 2017. Following the incident, a forged police report was circulated to several journalists prompting Pishevar to secure a gag order injunction at the High Court of Justice, forbidding the British press (but not press in other jurisdictions) from reporting his name in connection with the arrest. The injunction was lifted in mid-November, and the City of London Police announced that they would investigate the source of the report.

As a result of the release of the forged police report, Pishevar claimed he was being targeted by a smear campaign. He filed suit at the San Francisco County Superior Court against Washington, D.C.-based political opposition research firm Definers Public Affairs, accusing them of contacting reporters to spread false rumours, including that Pishevar was a Russian agent, that he had embezzled investors' money from Uber and that he had paid off his accuser to settle the rape claim. The suit also names Jill Hazelbaker, senior vice president of Global Policy and Communications at Uber and former political operative, without accusing her of complicity in the alleged smear campaign. Pishevar dismissed the lawsuit against Definers in February 2018, and stated that he intended to continue focusing his efforts on finding the people responsible for the forged London Police report. Earlier in 2017, Shervin Pishevar resigned after multiple women accused him of sexual misconduct.

== Awards and recognition ==
Pishevar was a keynote speaker at President Obama's Summit on Entrepreneurship in Algeria, and was a member of the Technology, Media and Telecommunications policy working group that helped create the Obama Technology and Innovation Plan in 2008. From 2011 to 2013, he is one of 10 members of the United Nations Foundation's Global Entrepreneurs Council. During his tenure with the council, he helped to create the UN's first mobile application. In 2012, he was chosen by the United States government as an "Outstanding American by Choice," an award which recognizes the achievements of naturalized Americans. Pishevar was one of the 15 leaders in technology who met with President Obama in 2013 to address issues including unauthorized intelligence disclosures, HealthCare.gov, and the US government's information technology. He was Entrepreneurial Ambassador on several United States Department of State delegations.

In 2015, he was appointed by Obama to the J. William Fulbright Foreign Scholarship Board. Pishevar was awarded an Ellis Island Medal of Honor in 2016.

In 2017, Pishevar was named to Vanity Fair's "New Establishment" list as well as the Forbes Midas List for the fourth consecutive year.

== Philanthropy ==
While attending University of California, Berkeley, Pishevar volunteered in the emergency room at a children's hospital, he also contacted the writer of a New York Times article in 1994, to see how he could help a Bosnian children's clinic doctor that was mentioned in a story about the Bosnian War. Throughout his professional career, he has been involved with several other charities and has dedicated time to travel to Africa and volunteer with Invisible Children and charity: water. He has also been active with the Bay Area Boys & Girls Clubs of America and served on the boards of Illuminate the Arts and BUILD.

Pishevar co-founded the organization 1% of Nothing with Matt Galligan, Michael Birch and Scott Harrison in 2011, with the goal of connecting startups and their founders to various causes. In 2013, he created the Cyrus Prize (named after Cyrus the Great), a $100,000 grant paid out over 3 years for Iranian inventors.

Pishevar has two children, whom he raised as a single father.
