= Ann Crady Weiss =

Ann Crady Weiss (née Crady) is an American entrepreneur, venture capitalist and advocate for workplace diversity and paid family leave. Weiss is on her second start-up, HatchBaby, with her co-founder and husband, Dave Weiss. She is a former Yahoo! executive who began her career as a corporate attorney for Wilson Sonsini Goodrich & Rosati.

== Early life ==
Weiss was born and raised in Palo Alto, California and attended Gunn High School. She received a B.A. in psychology from University of California, San Diego and a J.D. from Georgetown University graduating cum laude. As a child, Weiss possessed an "entrepreneurial spirit," from selling stationery door-to-door to setting up lemonade stands.

== Career ==
Weiss began her career working as a corporate securities attorney with Wilson, Sonsini, Goodrich, and Rosati from 1997 to 1999. In 2001, she went to work for Yahoo! as Director of New Initiatives, Yahoo! Autos. After leaving Yahoo! as a business development director in 2005, Weiss founded her parenting start-up, Maya's Mom. Named after Weiss' eldest child, the Palo Alto-based start-up was described by Weiss as "Yahoo Answers meets Facebook."

BabyCenter, a Johnson & Johnson Company, acquired Maya's Mom in 2007 under the leadership of Tina Sharkey, BabyCenter's Chairman and Global President from 2007 to 2012. Weiss stayed on at the San Francisco-based BabyCenter as their Senior Vice President of Consumer Experience, departing in 2010.

Weiss and her husband, Dave Weiss, co-founded Hatch Baby, a technology-driven start-up that developed the Smart Changing Pad. Weiss and her husband gained additional funding when they appeared on Season 7, Episode 14 of Shark Tank, pitching Hatch Baby in front of Guest Shark, Chris Sacca, an investor in Twitter and Uber. While Weiss pitched an initial ask of funding for $250,000 at 2.5% equity, this was turned down by the Shark Tank panel. However, Weiss was able to convince Sacca to invest in their company by proposing an alternative investment strategy.

== Personal life ==
Weiss is the mother of three children.
