= Sherpa Capital =

American venture capital company

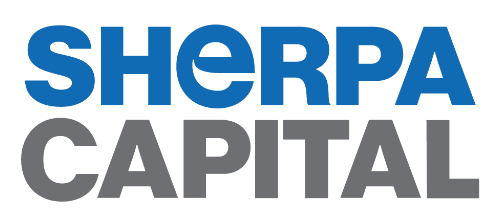
- Type: Private
- Industry: Venture capital
- Founded: 2013
- Headquarters: San Francisco, California
- Key people: Shervin Pishevar; Scott Stanford; Kirby Bartlett, Managing Director, Chief Operations Officer (COO) and Chief Compliance Officer (CCO).; Tina Sharkey, Venture Partner at Sherpa Capital.
- Products: Investments
- Number of employees: 12
- Website: sherpa.com

Sherpa Capital is an American venture capital firm established in March 2013 by Shervin Pishevar and Scott Stanford. Based in San Francisco, CA, Sherpa Capital specializes in early stage and growth startups ranging from e-commerce to technology.

== Founding and history ==
Sherpa Capital was established in March 2013 by Shervin Pishevar and Scott Stanford in San Francisco. It specializes in early stage and growth startups ranging from e-commerce to technology.

In 2016, Sherpa Capital raised $470 million for their latest fund: Sherpa Everest Fund and Sherpa Ventures Fund II. Pishevar and Stanford closed their first fund, Sherpa Ventures Fund I, for $154 million.

== Portfolio of investments ==
Their investments have included: Shyp, Munchery and Airbnb. It was one of the first investors in fintech startup Cadre, which raised $50 million in 2015. Some others were Thrive Capital, Founders Fund, General Catalyst, Khosla Ventures, and Kushner Companies. According to Real Estate Weekly, Cadre has "been ranked among the top real estate technology money magnets."

Along with Volvo Group's venture capital unit and Canaan Partners, Sherpa Capital was one of the investors in Cargomatic, an online company that connects companies needing transportation services with short-range drivers. Cargomatic raised more than $10 million from investors in 2014 and early 2015.

Hyperloop One (formerly Hyperloop Technologies) is a high-speed transportation concept launched by Elon Musk. Sherpa Capital participated in Series A and Series B rounds. Other investors were Caspian Ventures, Fast Digital, Formation 8, Khosla Ventures, and Zhen Capital.

They invested in the San Francisco-based HireAthena, human resources and accounting technology platform for the on-demand labor market, by June 2016. The platform includes workflow and project management functions.

Its advisers are Jim Messina, CEO of The Messina Group, and Padmasree Warrior, U.S. Chief Executive Officer and Chief Development Officer of NextEV. Warrior was listed as the 71st most powerful woman in the world by Forbes in 2014.

== Scope and focus ==
Sherpa Capital's strategy is "regulatory arbitrage", according to Pishevar because out-of-date rules stifle labor markets. He states, "stasis and monopolies are interesting, because if you can break them, you unlock a tremendous amount of economic value and job creation." Sherpa Capital is an investor in Airbnb Inc. and Uber, both of which are fighting regulators.

Pishevar brainstormed the idea with activists and designers for a mobile app so that civilians and police could communicate, without face-to-face contact, an idea to stem racial tension and potentially reduce police shootings. However, an application developed by the American Civil Liberties Union to report police misconduct in the 2010s did not receive widespread support. And, this application would require "the wholesale buy-in of both police forces and civilians," according to Jenna Wortham of The New York Times.

== Controversies ==
One of Sherpa Capital's founders has become embroiled in a legal issue regarding one of its venture capital investments. Pishevar and Brogan BamBrogan, a former senior engineer at SpaceX, began building Hyperloop One to build a very-high-speed train from San Francisco to Los Angeles. BamBrogan and three other individuals were fired by Pishevar and a senior Hyperloop One manager. BamBrogan and the other former executives filed a suit in California Superior Court in Los Angeles in July 2016 against Hyperloop, stating that they were defamed, wrongfully fired, and harassed and claiming breach of contract. A lawyer representing Hyperloop One, Orin Snyder, said, "Today's lawsuit brought by former employees of Hyperloop One is unfortunate and delusional. These employees tried to stage a coup and failed. They knew that the company was aware of their actions, and today's lawsuit is their preemptive strike. The claims are pure nonsense and will be met with a swift and potent legal response."

The same month, Hyperloop filed a countersuit, seeking $50 million in damages and $200 million in punitive damages. They allege that the engineers disclosed proprietary company information, breached their fiduciary duty to the company, and violated their non-solicitation and non-compete agreements. BamBrogan's lawyer, Justin Berger, responded to the countersuit, "Now, Defendants are attempting to recast Plaintiffs’ efforts as a failed coup, and claim that Plaintiffs were planning to start a competing company for months. To the contrary, Plaintiffs had no desire to leave the company until their attempted intervention was met with threats of termination."

== Sherpa Foundry ==
Sherpa Foundry, also founded by Pishevar and Stanford, is a consultancy providing strategy and advice to entrepreneurs and startups. Sherpa Foundry brought on Tina Sharkey as their CEO in 2013, who was succeeded by Neal Hansch.
