= Soma (company) =

Water filter designer

- Company type: Private
- Industry: Water filtration
- Founded: 2012
- Headquarters: San Francisco, California
- Products: Water filters
- Website: www.drinksoma.com

Soma is a company that designs water filtration systems. It was founded by Mike Del Ponte, Ido Leffler, Rohan Oza, and Zach Allia in 2012.

== History ==
Del Ponte received inspiration for Soma while hosting a dinner party. He was too embarrassed to display his plastic water filter on the table. To compound his embarrassment, when he attempted to decant the water into a glass carafe, the lid flew off the pitcher, spilling water onto the floor. While cleaning up the mess, aided by a dinner guest, Ido Leffler (the founder of Yes To, Inc), they hit on the idea to create a water filter.

The new company, Soma, launched a Kickstarter campaign in December 2012. Within the first nine days they had raised over $100,000, which rose to $147,000 by the end of the campaign.

In July 2013, Soma announced a $3.7 million seed round of funding, from investors that included Baseline Ventures, Forerunner Ventures, Lerer Ventures, Collaborative Fund, Cowboy Ventures, Vast Ventures, Mindful Investors, and Tim Ferriss. Soma opened ordering to the public on September 16, 2013.

In November 2017, Soma was acquired by Full Circle Home, a home goods and cleaning supply company.

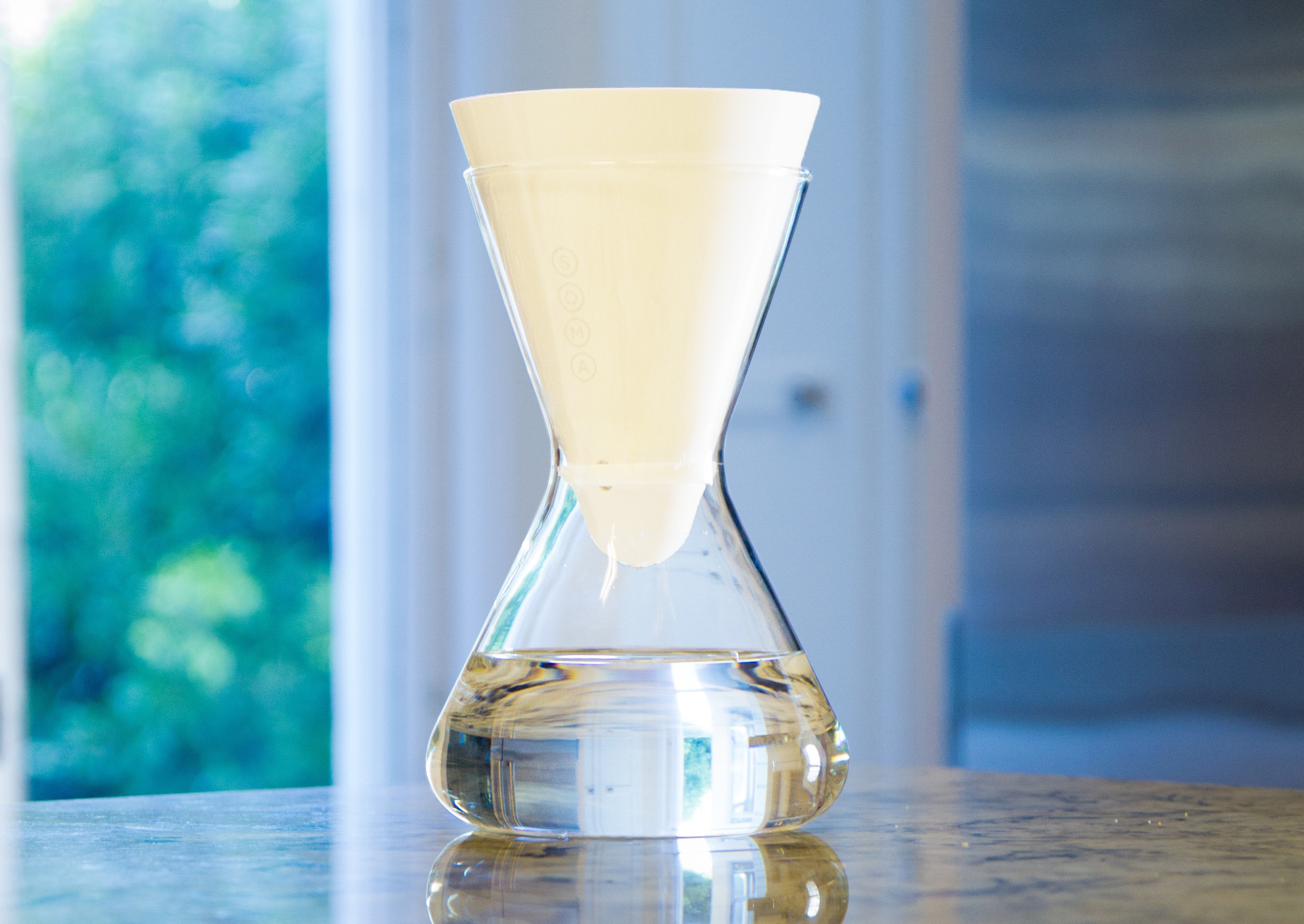
An image of the Soma carafe

== Description ==
The Soma water filtration system consists of a glass carafe and a biodegradable water filter. The filters are delivered to customers via a subscription service every two months. The filter was designed by David Beeman, who created the water formulas for Starbucks and Peet's Coffee. Soma has also partnered with charity: water to donate clean drinking water to those in need through the sale of every filter.

== Reception ==
The New York Times called Soma a "welcome change to the status quo" and Inc. Magazine named Soma one of the "most audacious companies of 2013."
