= Cydni Tetro =

American businesswoman

- Born: Cydni Rogers; Chicago, Illinois, U.S.
- Citizenship: American
- Education: Brigham Young University (BS), (MBA)
- Website: cydnitetro.com

Cydni Tetro is an American business executive and entrepreneur.

== Early life and education ==
Tetro obtained a Bachelor of Science in computer science and a Master of Business Administration from Brigham Young University.

== Career ==
Tetro was the founder of digital experience company ForgeDX. Tetro was the founder and CEO of 3DplusMe, a 3D printing software platform, that was acquired by WhiteClouds.

Tetro spent six years as an Entrepreneur in residence at The Walt Disney Company, building technology businesses from research and development projects and launching those products into theme parks and ESPN properties.

Tetro was chief executive officer of Brandless, an American e-commerce company. She later became Chief Information Officer of Swire Coca-Cola, a bottler for The Coca-Cola Company, in 2024.

In 2007, Tetro co-founded a non-profit, the Women Tech Council, to amplify the economic impact of women in technology with more than 10,000 members in its community. As president of the Women Tech Council, she led the launch of the Women Tech Talent Pipeline Alliance along with Utah's Office of Economic Development, Code in Color, Latinas in Tech Utah, United Way, the Utah Department of Workforce Services, and Tech Moms. Tetro was named to the Zenovate board of directors in 2021. She is also faculty for the Goldman Sachs 10,000 Small Businesses initiative.

== Personal life ==
Tetro grew up in Lindon, Utah the oldest of eight children. She is married with three children and is a member of the Church of Jesus Christ of Latter-day Saints.
