= Tina Sharkey =

American entrepreneur, advisor, and investor

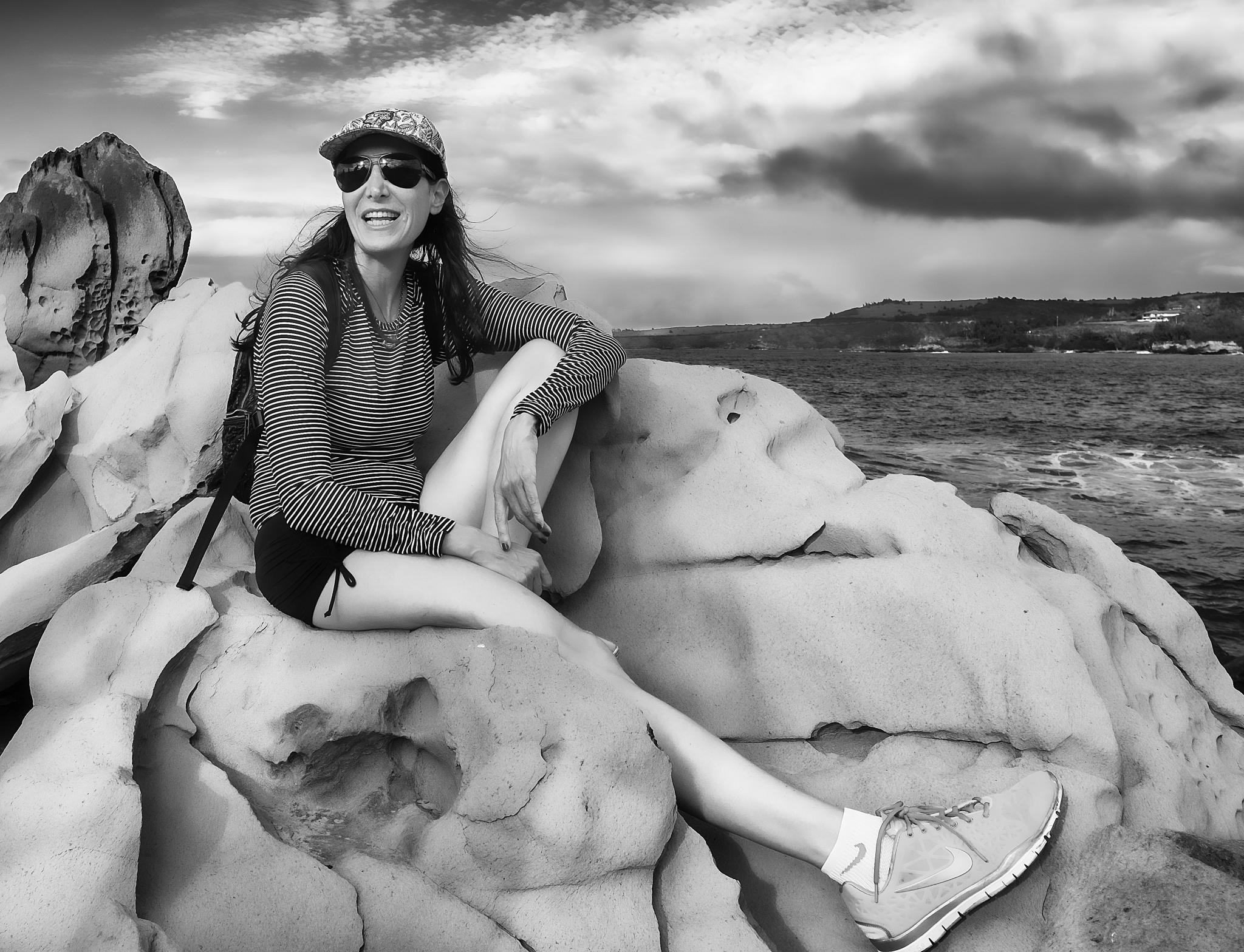
- Sharkey (2014)
- Born: 1964 (age 61–62); New York, New York
- Education: University of Pennsylvania
- Occupations: Entrepreneur; Investor; Advisor
- Years active: 1993–present
- Organization(s): Aspen Institute; WE Charity; United Nations Foundation
- Board member of: PBS; Brit + Co; Ipsy

Tina Sharkey (born 1964) is an American entrepreneur, advisor, and investor. Noted for "discovering ways to bring consumers and businesses together," she co-founded Brandless and iVillage; served as chair and global president of BabyCenter; led multiple business units at AOL, and served as president of the Sesame Street Digital Group. She is a member of the PBS Board of Directors.

== Early life and education ==
Sharkey was born in New York City. Her father and grandfather worked in the garment industry, as did her mother, Mona Sherman, who became the president of Perry Ellis America when Sharkey was in high school. She attended the University of Pennsylvania, spending a semester at the University of Paris: Sorbonne, and earned a Bachelor of Arts in International Relations.

== Career ==
=== HDTV, iVillage, Socialmedia.com ===
Sharkey began her career as part of the team that introduced HDTV to the US market and the media industry, and, as part of an HDTV task force, she lobbied Congress at the age of 22. In 1995, she worked with Barry Diller to create the format for QVC's short-lived sister network Q2, Sharkey also co-founded iVillage in 1995, and served as its chief community architect and head of programming. It became the largest online destination for women, and was sold to NBC Universal for $600 million in 2006.

Sharkey registered the domain names socialmedia.com, socialmedia.net, and socialmedia.org in the late 1990s. She was one of the first people to use the term "social media".

=== Sesame Workshop, AOL, Baby Center ===
In 1999, after creating the interactive and online brands for Sesame Workshop, Sharkey was recruited by America Online's vice chairman, Ted Leonsis, to join AOL as a senior media executive. At AOL, she oversaw multiple business units and led community programming initiatives, including the development of "People Connection" and aol.com. She remained at AOL until 2006, when she was appointed chairman and global president of BabyCenter LLC, a wholly owned subsidiary of Johnson & Johnson.

At BabyCenter, Sharkey built a site for parenting and pregnancy that served more than 100 million visitors in 22 worldwide markets. She led Johnson & Johnson's initiative with the U.S. State Department for the Mobile Alliance for Maternal Action (MAMA). Announced by US Secretary of State Hillary Clinton, and developed with the cooperation of the White House, MAMA served women in low-resource settings from South Africa to Bangladesh and India. New and expectant mothers register their due date or their baby's age via mobile phone in order to receive text messages which provide relevant developmental, health, and nutritional information.

=== Sherpa Foundry, Sherpa Ventures, Brandless ===
In 2013, Sharkey was appointed CEO of Sherpa Foundry. Founded by Shervin Pishevar and Scott Stanford, Sherpa Foundry partners with public companies to identify, define and co-develop ideas and innovations through external resources.

In 2014, Sharkey met Ido Leffler, the co-founder of Yes To, Inc. and Yoobi, among other companies, and in 2017, they launched Brandless, an e-commerce site described by Fortune as "the next Procter and Gamble for millennials." Sharkey served as the company's CEO.

== Investments and advisory roles ==
In addition to other advisory roles and directorships, Sharkey is a member of the PBS Board of Directors, the Havenly Board of Directors, and the HeyDay Board of Directors. She is a guest lecturer and mentor at the Stanford Graduate School of Business. and an active investor in early stage media and technology companies. She was included on Business Insider's list of the Top 50 angel and investors.

Sharkey is a 2006 Henry Crown Fellow at the Aspen Institute and a founding and lifetime board member of Baby Buggy, a nonprofit organization which provides essential services to families in need. She lives with her family in Mill Valley, California.
