= Brandless =

American e-commerce company

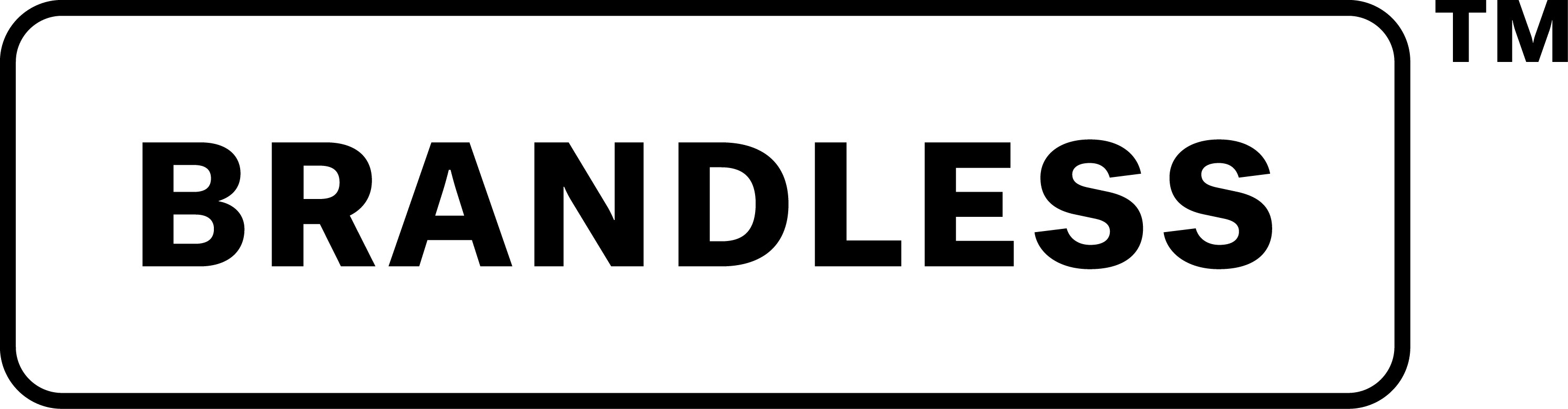
- Type: Private
- Industry: Consumer packaged goods (CPG), grocery
- Founded: 2016; 10 years ago
- Founders: Ido Leffler; Tina Sharkey
- Headquarters: Draper, Utah, United States
- Area served: United States
- Key people: Tiffany Vail, CEO Jeff Lind, COO Matt Durham, President
- Products: Food; Beauty; Personal care Housewares
- Number of employees: 100 (2021)
- Website: brandless.com

Brandless is an American e-commerce company that manufactures and sells products under its own label led by Tiffany Vail as CEO.

Brandless was founded by Ido Leffler and Tina Sharkey, it launched in July 2017.

On February 10, 2020, the company confirmed it would cease operations. The assets of Brandless were purchased in June 2020 by Clarke Capital Partners and Ikonifi. Brandless subsequently relaunched in the summer of 2020. The company raised $118 million in August 2021.

== History ==
Tina Sharkey and Ido Leffler met while living in Mill Valley, California. Sharkey, the founder of iVillage and the former CEO of BabyCenter, had a background in online communities, and Leffler, the founder of several companies, including Yes To, Inc. and Yoobi, had experience in consumer products.

In mid-2016, Sharkey resigned from her position as CEO of Sherpa Foundry to become CEO of Brandless, with Leffler serving as its chairman. The company raised $16 million in funding led by Redpoint Ventures in November 2016, and at launch had received a total of $50 million in venture capital from New Enterprise Associates, Google Ventures, and others.

In 2018, the company launched a pop-up store in Los Angeles in May. Brandless launched a second, larger pop-up store in New York in October 2018.

In May 2019, Brandless raised $240 million as a part of its series C funding round. Soon after, Tina Sharkey stepped down as CEO after friction between her and lead investor SoftBank Vision Fund.

In February 2020, Brandless announced that it would cease operations, citing fierce competition and business model inviability in the direct-to-consumer market. The business laid off 70 staff members (about 90% of the operation at the time) with the remaining employees managing open orders.

The assets of Brandless were purchased in June 2020 by Onward Partners, LLC, a company formed by Clarke Capital Partners and Ikonifi. Brandless relaunched under the leadership of Clarke Capital Partners, a family office based in Silicon Slopes, Utah. Cydni Tetro was named CEO in 2021, shortly after the acquisition. The company raised $118 million in debt and equity in August 2021, one of the largest funding rounds ever to be led by a female CEO.

== Business model ==
Brandless was based in San Francisco, California, and operated an additional facility in Minneapolis, Minnesota. It marketed its foods as GMO-free, its health and beauty items as cruelty-free, and paper products as adhering to sustainable forestry practices. Products' labels consist of only a white box with the product's name and two to five descriptors, such as organic, kosher, or gluten-free. Brandless is a brand of its own.

The company operated a direct-to-consumer model. Initially, Brandless priced single items at $3, or multiple items for $3 total. That policy changed in January 2019 and higher-priced products were offered.

In 2019, Brandless began to offer an optional subscription service to its customers. Under the new management, the business model moved to a mission-driven, omni-channel e-commerce platform making acquisitions of like-minded companies to plug into Brandless growth engine.

== Awards and recognition ==
In February 2018, Brandless received the Best NewCo of the Year award from NewCo Honors for disrupting retail markets and donating 250,000 meals to Feeding America. Additionally, it was awarded "StartUp of the Year" by Ad Age in 2018 and was also awarded one of "The World's Most Innovative Companies in Retail" by Fast Company in 2019.

== See also ==
- No Name (brand)
