= Hyperloop One =

American transportation technology company

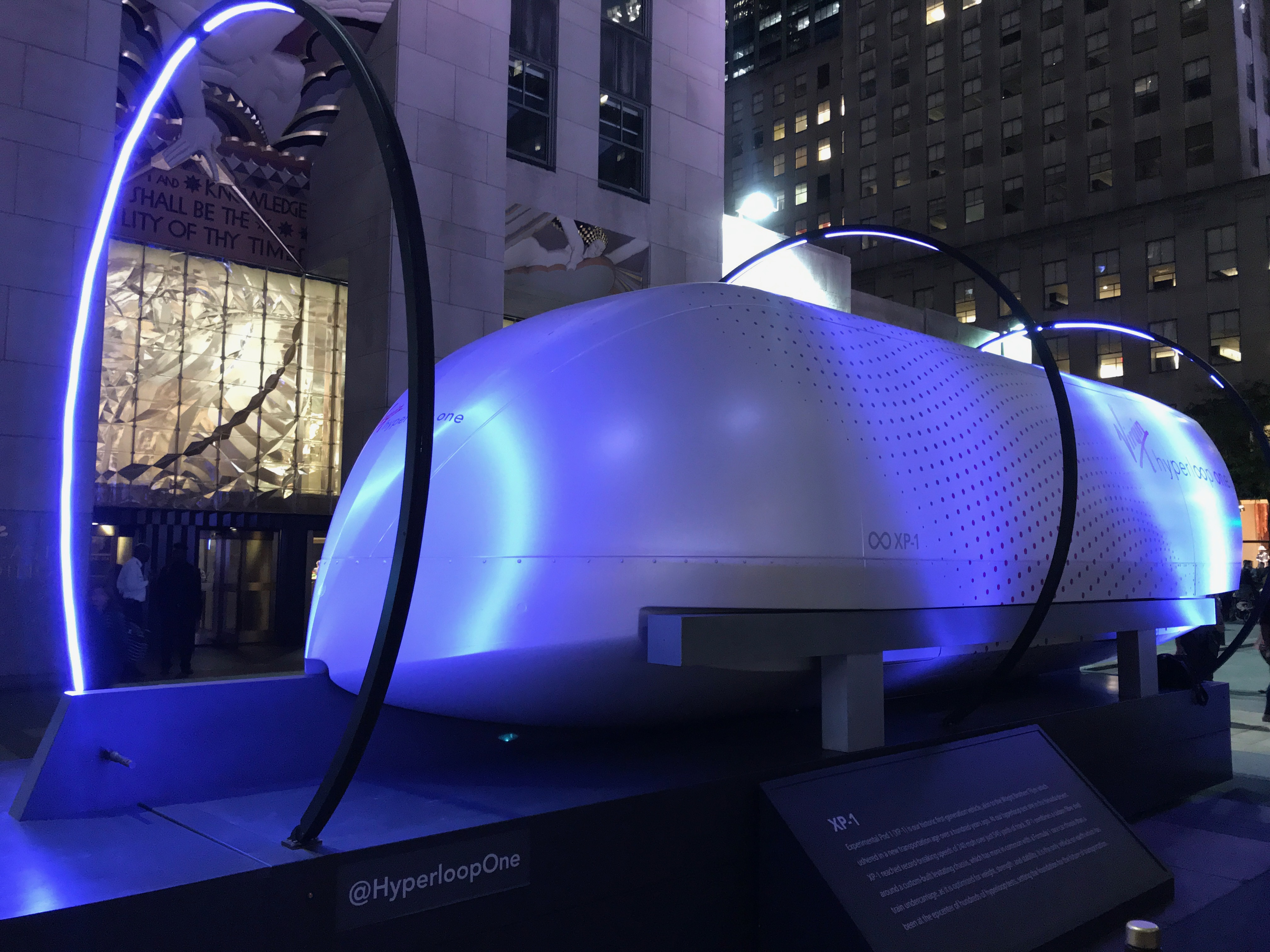
- Hyperloop One XP-1 pod on display
- Formerly: Hyperloop Technologies (2014–2016); Hyperloop One (2016–2017); Virgin Hyperloop One (2017–2020); Virgin Hyperloop (2020–2022)
- Type: Private
- Industry: Transportation Technology
- Founded: June 1, 2014; 12 years ago
- Founders: Brogan BamBrogan; Shervin Pishevar
- Defunct: December 31, 2023; 2 years ago
- Headquarters: Los Angeles, California, U.S.
- Key people: Sultan Ahmed bin Sulayem (Chairman); Raja Narayanan (Interim CEO)

Hyperloop One, known as Virgin Hyperloop until November 2022, was an American transportation technology company that worked to commercialize high-speed travel utilizing the Hyperloop concept which was a variant of the vacuum train. The company was established on June 1, 2014, and reorganized and renamed on October 12, 2017.

Hyperloop systems were intended to move cargo and passengers at airline speeds but at a fraction of the cost. They were designed to run suspended by magnetic systems in a partially-evacuated tube. The original Hyperloop concept proposed to use a linear electric motor to accelerate and decelerate an air bearing levitated pod through a low-pressure tube. The vehicle was to glide silently at speeds up to 760 mph (1,220 km/h) with very low turbulence. The system was proposed to be entirely autonomous, quiet, direct-to-destination, and on-demand. It would have been built on elevated structures or in tunnels, free of at-grade crossings and requiring less right of way than high-speed rail or highways.

Virgin Hyperloop made substantive technical changes to Elon Musk's initial proposal and chose not to pursue the Los Angeles–San Francisco notional route that Musk envisioned in his 2013 alpha-design white paper. It demonstrated a form of propulsion technology on May 11, 2016, at its test site in North Las Vegas. It completed a 500 m (1,600 ft) Development Loop (DevLoop) and on May 12, 2017, held its first full-scale test. The test combined Hyperloop components including vacuum, propulsion, levitation, sled, control systems, tube, and structures.

On November 8, 2020, after more than 400 uncrewed tests, the firm conducted the first human trial at a speed of 172 km/h (107 mph) at its test site in Las Vegas, Nevada. However, in February 2022, the company abandoned plans for human rated travel and instead focused on freight, laying off more than 100 employees amounting to half its total workforce. In November of that year the company decided to rebrand, reverting to the name, Hyperloop One.

It was announced on December 21, 2023 that the company would cease operations on December 31, 2023, due to a number of factors including financial challenges, high interest rates, initial backing and support, as well as to its failure to secure any contracts for building a working hyperloop system; it began selling its assets and laying off remaining employees. According to The Verge, all of its intellectual property would shift to its majority stakeholder, major Dubai port operator DP World.

== History ==
=== Origins ===
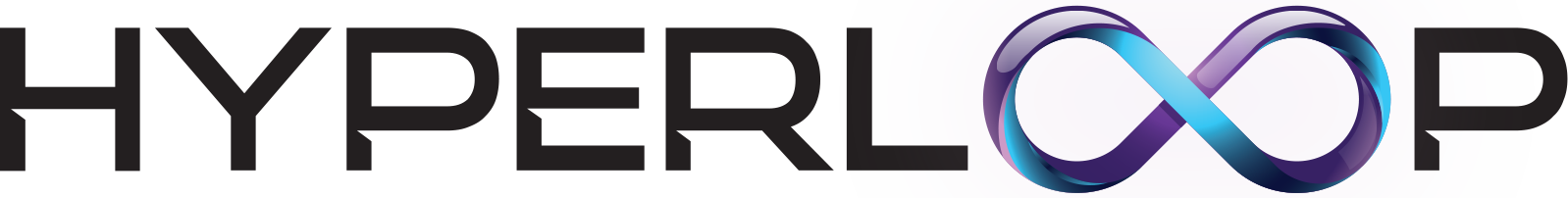
Hyperloop Technologies logo (2014–2016)

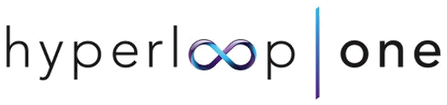
Hyperloop One logo (2016–2017)

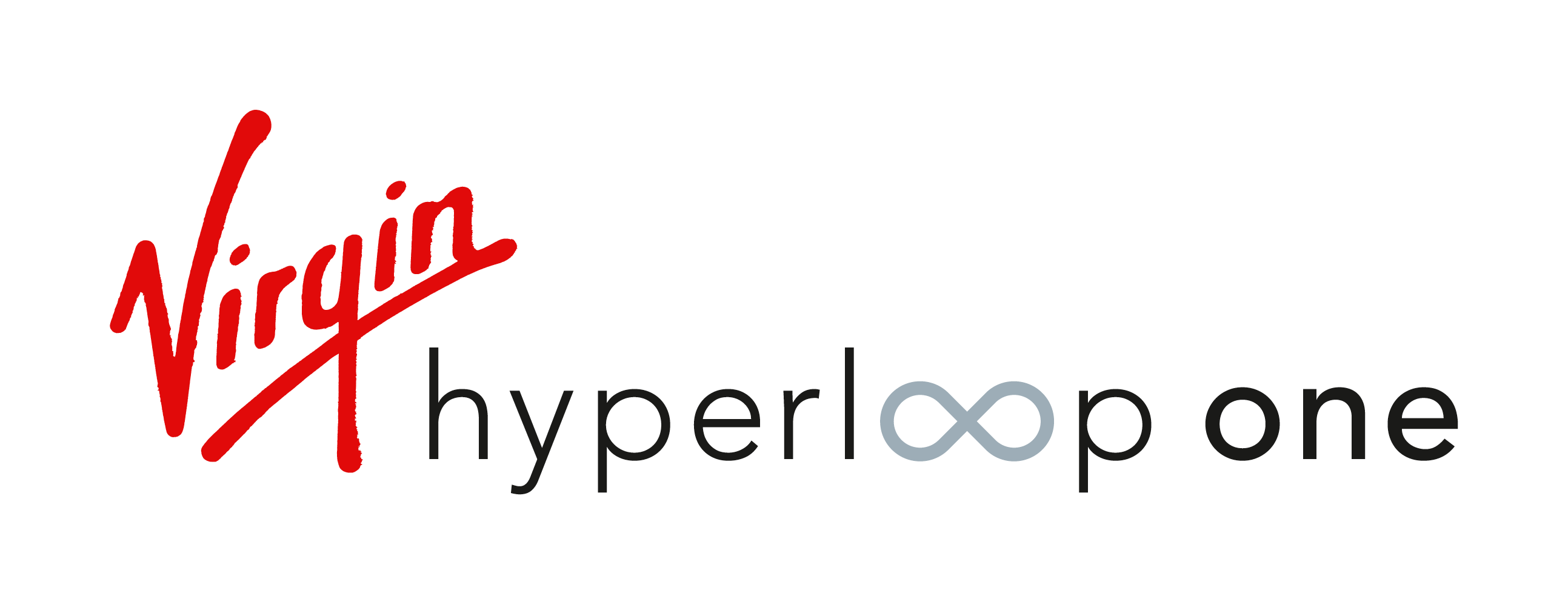
Virgin Hyperloop One logo (2017–2020)

The idea of trains in vacuum has been elaborated many times in history of science and science-fiction. In 1910, American rocket pioneer Robert H. Goddard designed a train that would go from Boston to New York in 12 minutes; though never built, it would have floated on magnets inside a vacuum-sealed tunnel.

The recent plans for a version of vacuum train called Hyperloop emerged from a conversation between Elon Musk and Iranian-American Silicon Valley investor Shervin Pishevar when they were flying together to Cuba on a humanitarian mission in January 2012. Pishevar asked Musk to elaborate on his hyperloop idea, which the industrialist had been mulling over for some time. Pishevar suggested using it for cargo, an idea Musk hadn't considered, but he did say he was considering open-sourcing the concept because he was too busy running SpaceX and Tesla. Pishevar pushed Musk to publish his ideas about the hyperloop, so that Pishevar could study them.

On August 12, 2013, Musk released the Hyperloop Alpha white paper, generating widespread attention and enthusiasm. In the months that followed Pishevar incorporated Hyperloop Technologies, which would later be renamed Hyperloop One, and recruited the first board members, including David O. Sacks, Jim Messina, and Joe Lonsdale. Pishevar also recruited a cofounder, former SpaceX engineer Brogan Bambrogan. The firm set up shop in Bambrogan's garage in Los Angeles in November 2014. By January 2015, the firm had raised $9 million in venture capital from Pishevar's Sherpa Capital and investors such as Formation 8 and Zhen Fund, and was able to move into its current campus in the Los Angeles Arts District. Forbes magazine put the firm on its February 2015 cover, landing the startup many fresh recruits and much new investor interest. In June 2015, Pishevar recruited former Cisco president Rob Lloyd as an investor and, eventually, the company's CEO.

=== Funding and growth ===
Between June 2015 and December 2015, the company continued to hire engineers and expand its downtown campus (now up to 75,000 square feet). In December 2015, Hyperloop Tech announced it would hold an open-air propulsion test at a new Test and Safety Site in Nevada. At the time, the company disclosed it had raised $37 million in financing to date and was completing a Series B round of $80m, which they closed on in May 2016. In October 2016, the firm announced that it had raised another $50 million, led by an investment from 8VC and DP World.

The propulsion open-air test or POAT, was successfully held in North Las Vegas on May 11, 2016. The POAT sled accelerated to 134 mph (216 km/h) in 2.3 seconds, representing a crucial proof of concept. At the time, the renamed Hyperloop One announced it had secured partnerships with global engineering and design firms such as AECOM, SYSTRA, Arup, Deutsche Bahn, General Electric, and Bjarke Ingels.

On November 10, 2016, Hyperloop One released its first system designs in collaboration with the Bjarke Ingels Group.

On October 12, 2017, Hyperloop One and the Virgin Group announced that it developed a strategic investment partnership, resulting in Richard Branson joining the board of directors. The global strategic partnership will focus on passenger and mixed-use cargo service in addition to the creation of a new passenger division. Hyperloop One had raised $295 million on December 18, 2017, and subsequently was renamed Virgin Hyperloop One, and Branson became the chairman of the board of directors. As of May 2019, the company had raised $400 million.

By November 2020, the firm had been renamed Virgin Hyperloop, having previously been known as Hyperloop One and Virgin Hyperloop One.

In October 2020, West Virginia governor Jim Justice announced that Virgin Hyperloop would be constructing a certification facility on land in Tucker and Grant Counties. About 800 acres owned by Western Pocahontas near Mount Storm was donated to the West Virginia University Foundation, and cooperation was expected from WVU, Marshall University, and the West Virginia Community and Technical College System.

=== Focus on freight and layoffs ===
In February 2022, the Financial Times reported that the company laid off more than 100 employees, with the move allowing it to focus on cargo transport instead of passenger travel. In December 2022, a second round of layoffs was reported, focused on the firm's downtown Los Angeles staff and Las Vegas operational team.

While Hyperloop One focuses on freight, competitors continue to focus on a mix of freight and passenger travel.

The change in focus put construction of the West Virginia facility in question, until the company admitted in March 2023 that it had been cancelled.

The company shutdown operations in 2023 laying off its remaining staff and liquidating its assets.

== Test pods ==
=== XP-1 ===
After Hyperloop One began the construction of 500-metre (1,600 ft) DevLoop in October 2016, the company successfully conducted the first full-system test using the levitating chassis without passenger pod on May 12, 2017. On July 12, 2017, the company revealed images of its first generation pod prototype to be used at the DevLoop test site in Nevada to test aerodynamics. The system-wide test integrated Hyperloop components including vacuum, propulsion, levitation, sled, control systems, tube, and structures. The company designed and built its first generation full-scale test pod name XP-1 (short for experimental pod one) to be used in the full-scale pod tests.

XP-1 has the length of 8.7 metres (29 ft), the width of 2.4 metres (7.9 ft), and the height of 2.4 metres (7.9 ft). The pod's motor was evolved from 500 motors that were built and tested in order to operate with resiliency in near-vacuum environment. The pod was successfully tested for the first time on July 29, 2017, with the 300 metres (980 ft) of acceleration to reach the recorded speeds of 310 kilometres per hour (190 mph). The pod achieved 3,151 horsepower during the test inside the depressurized tube with conditions similar to the atmosphere at 200,000 feet (61 km) above sea level.

Experimental pod one (XP-1)

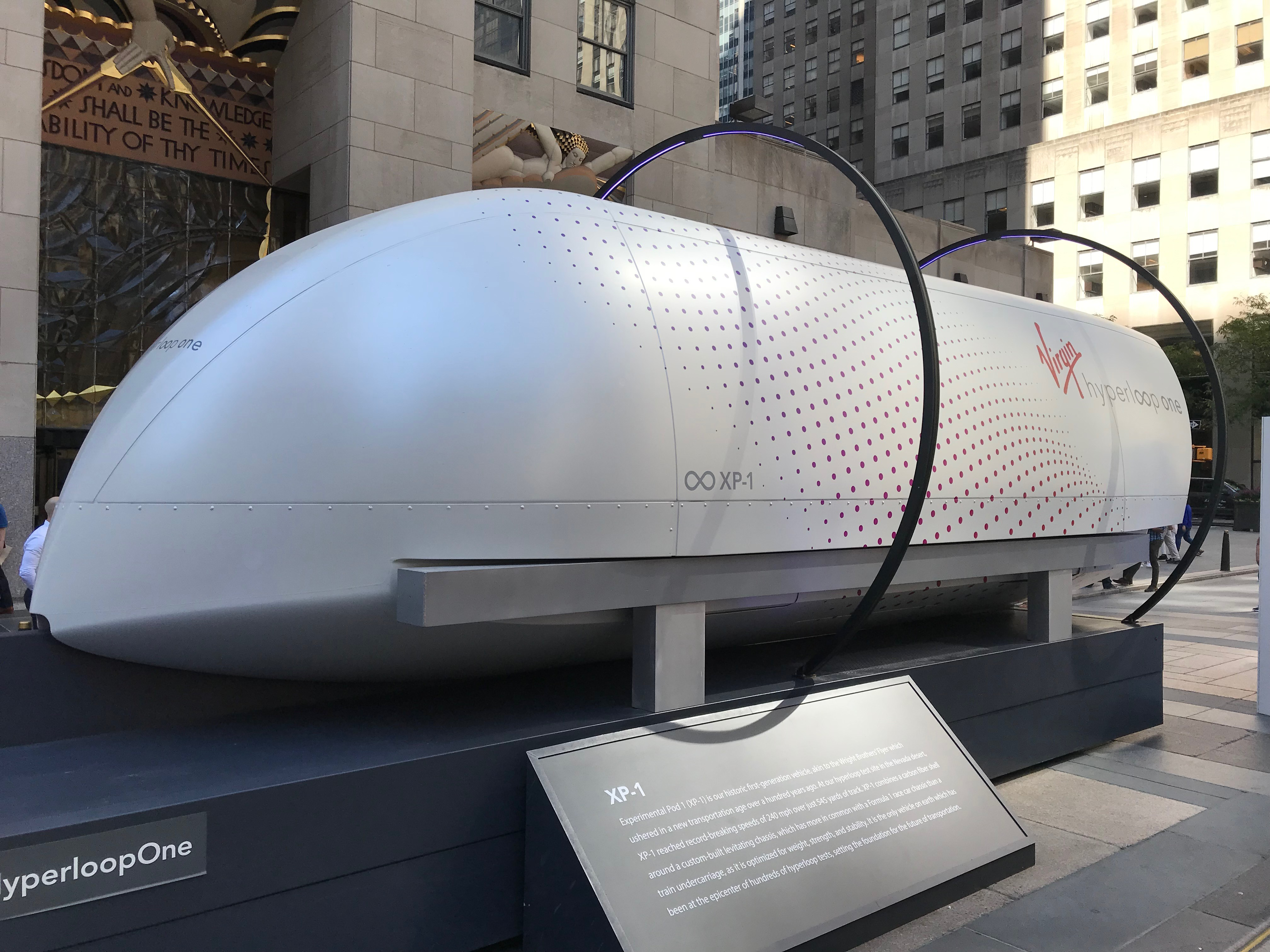
Front view

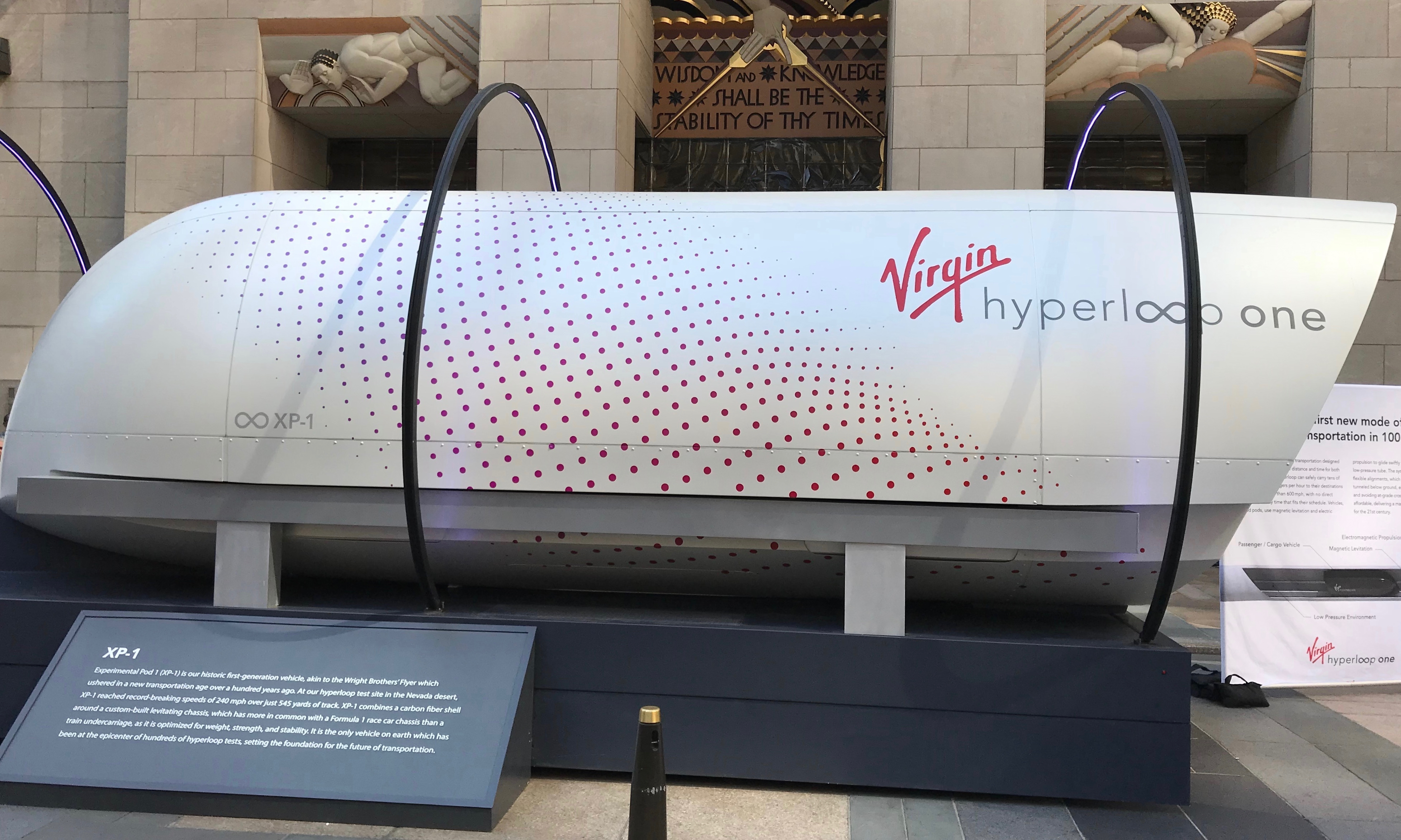
Side view

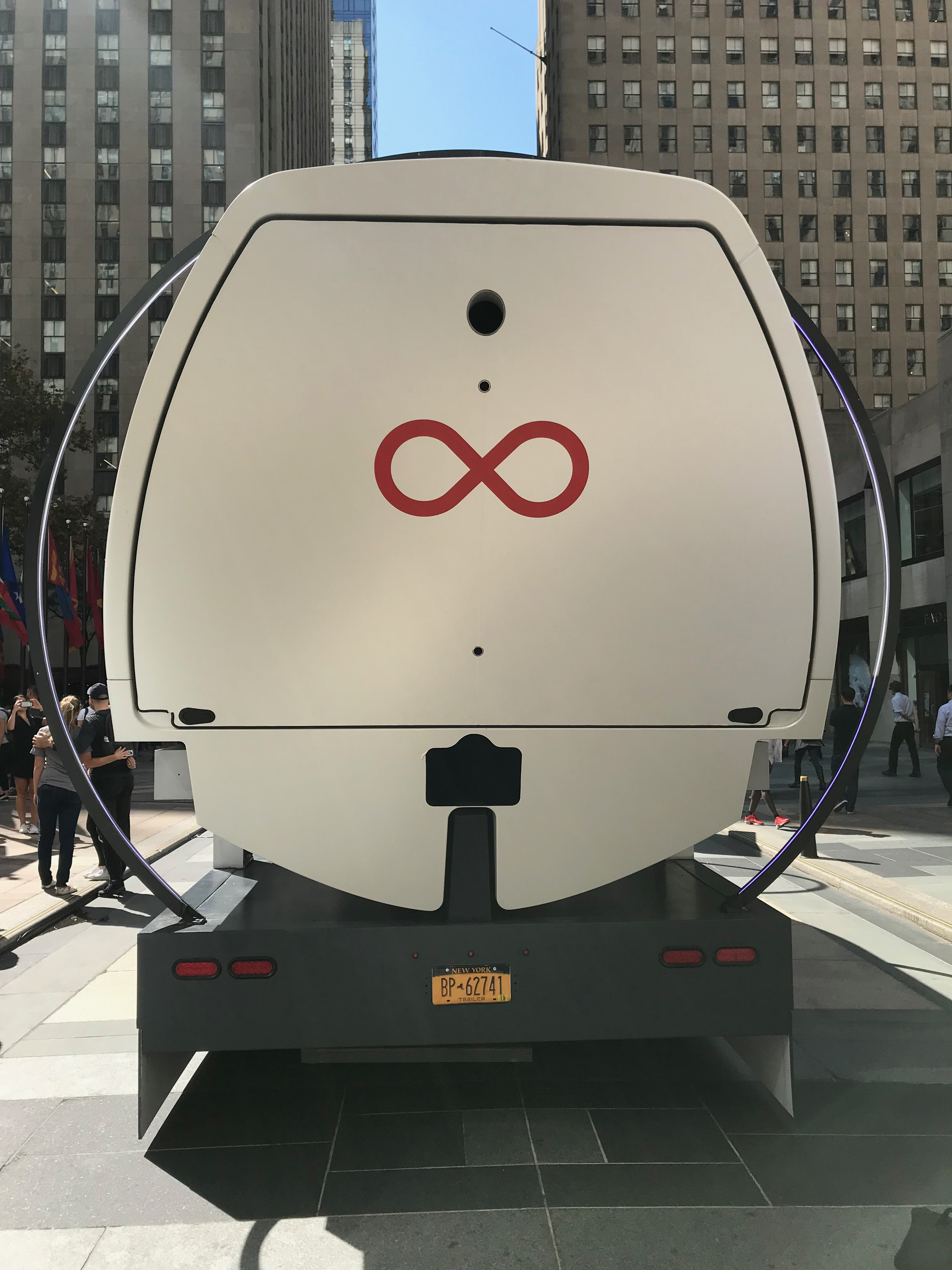
Rear view

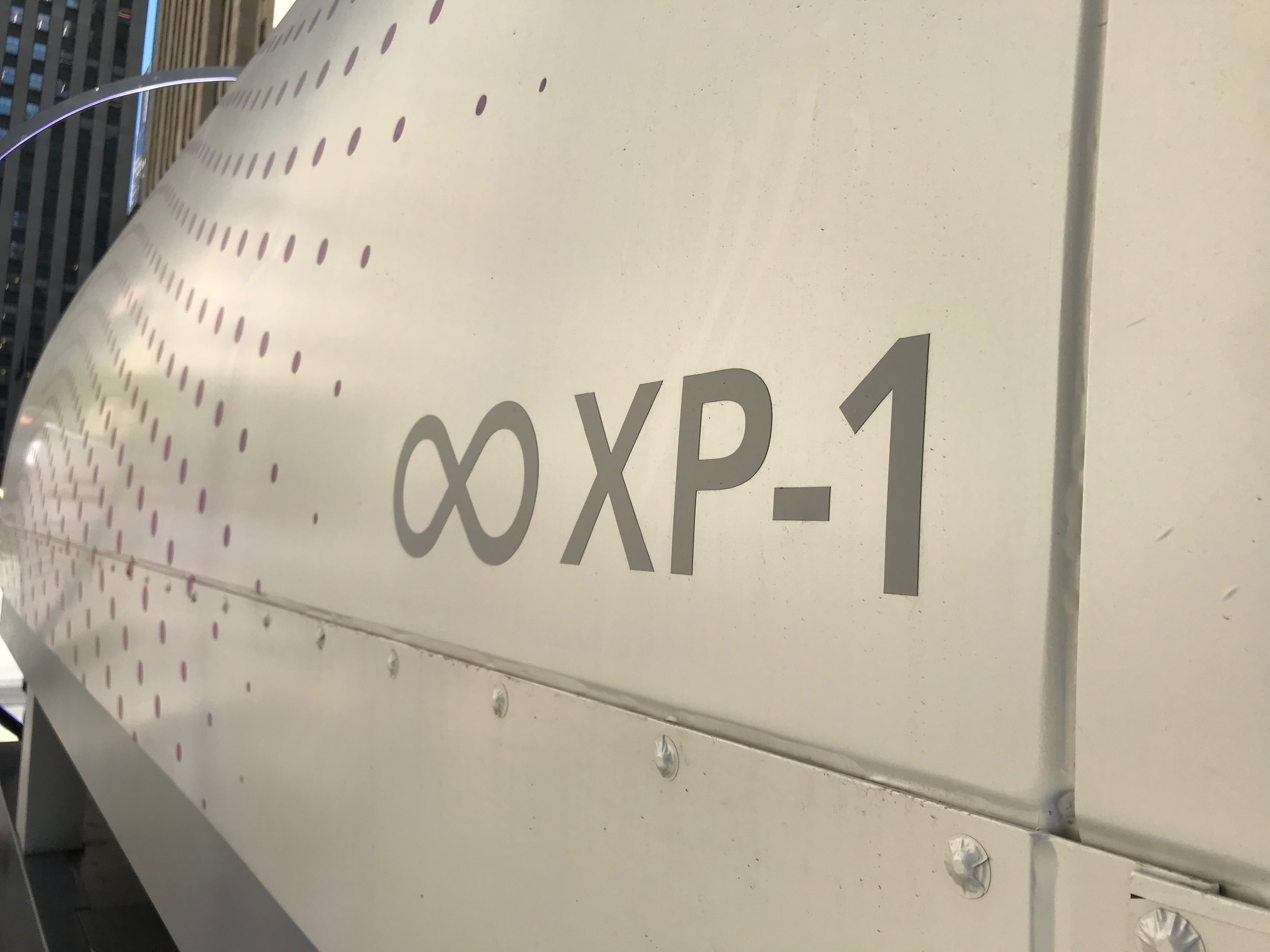
Seams of carbon fiber shell

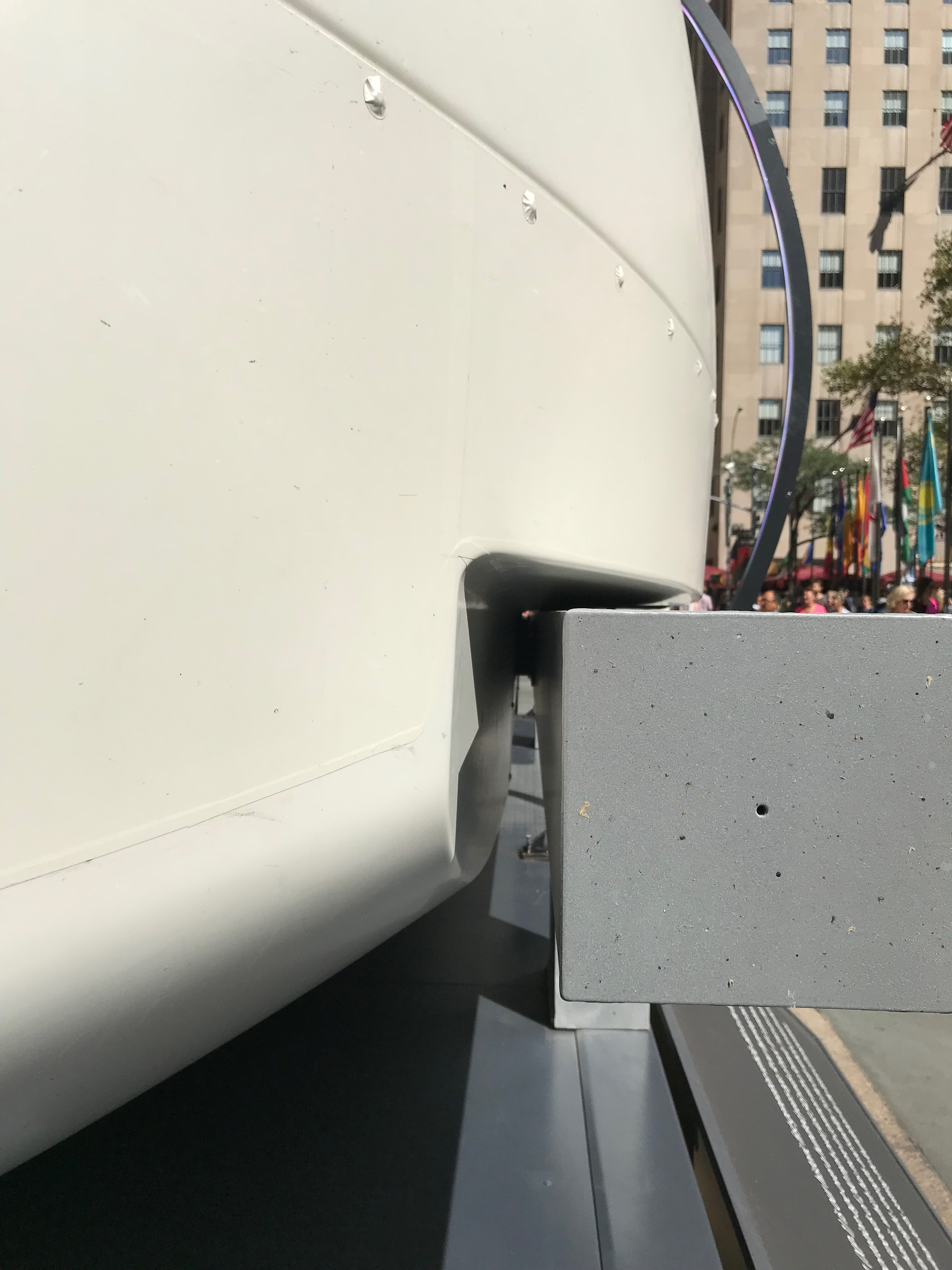
Profile at a side rail

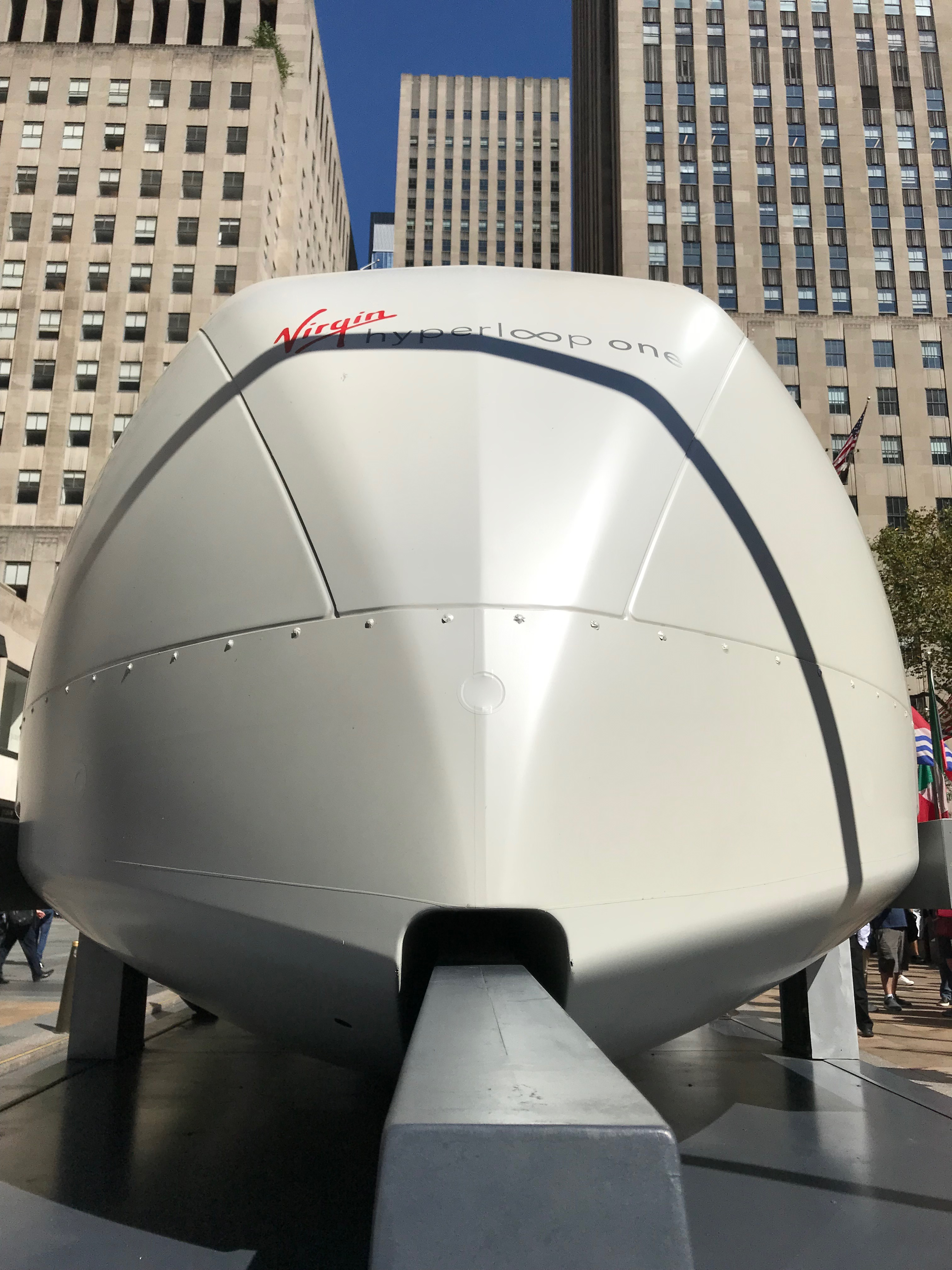
Profile at the center rail

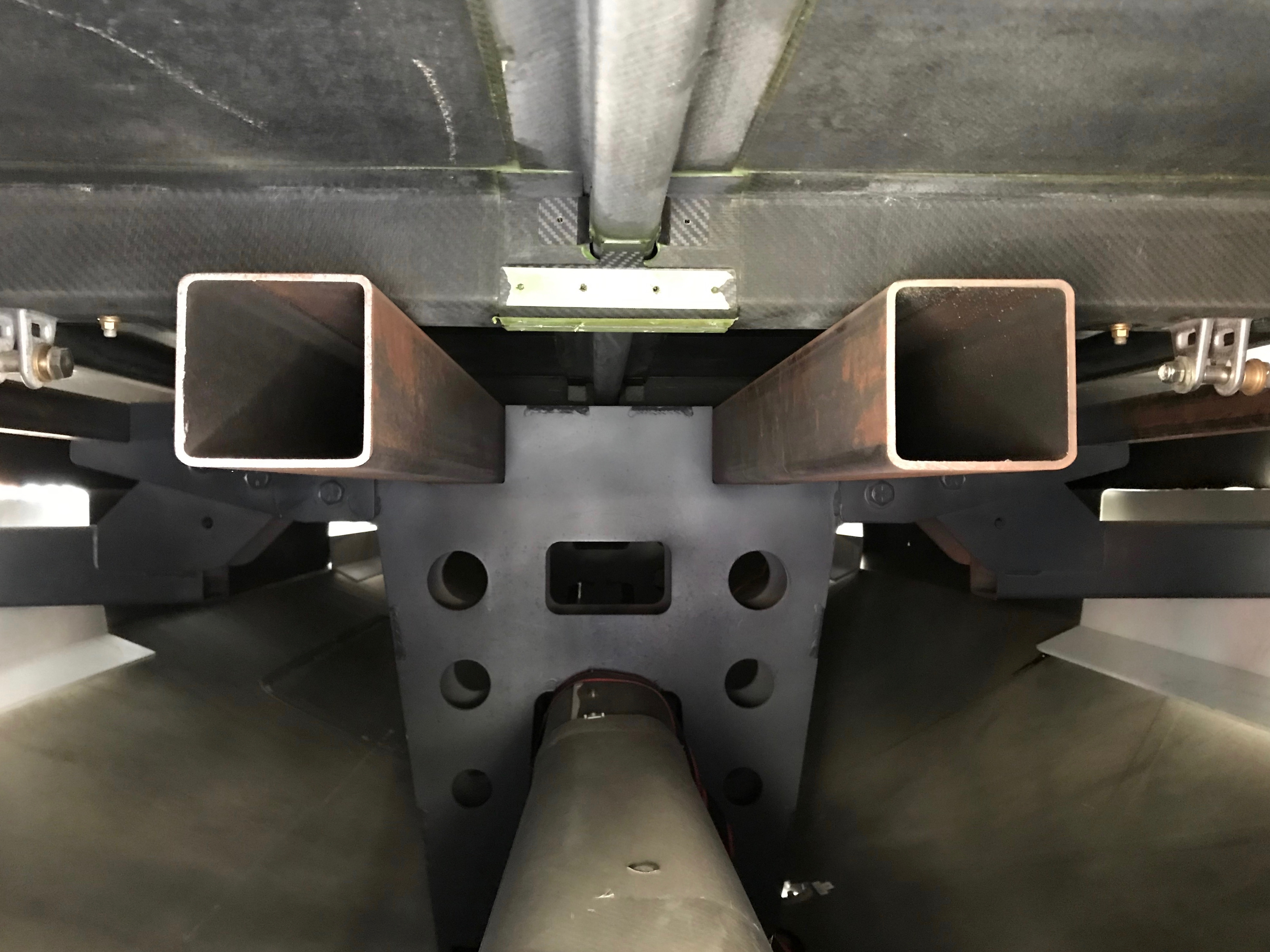
Levitating chassis at the bottom inside the shell

On August 2, 2017, Hyperloop One successfully tested its XP-1 passenger pod, reaching speeds of up to 192 mph (309 km/h). It traveled for just over 980 ft (300 m) before the brakes kicked in and it rolled to a stop. The XP-1 speed record was broken in August 2017 by WARR Hyperloop during the second Hyperloop Pod Competition with the top speeds of 324 kilometres per hour (201 mph); however, the pods in the competition were too small to carry passengers.

XP-1 set the world's speed record again during the test in December 2017, reaching 387 kilometres per hour (240 mph). With that test, the company also demonstrated its airlock technology that allowed the pod to be transferred into the depressurized tube. With this system, XP-1 pod can be put in an airlock which takes a few minutes to depressurize before entering the already depressurized tube. Otherwise, the pod would need to enter the tube and wait for the 4-hour depressurization of the entire test tube. In 2018, WARR Hyperloop broke XP-1 record again in the third Hyperloop Pod Competition, on a longer track.

In the summer of 2019, the company took XP-1 on a roadshow to Ohio, Texas, Kansas, New York, Missouri, North Carolina, and Washington, D.C.

=== XP-2 ===
Experimental pod two (XP-2) also known as 'Pegasus'

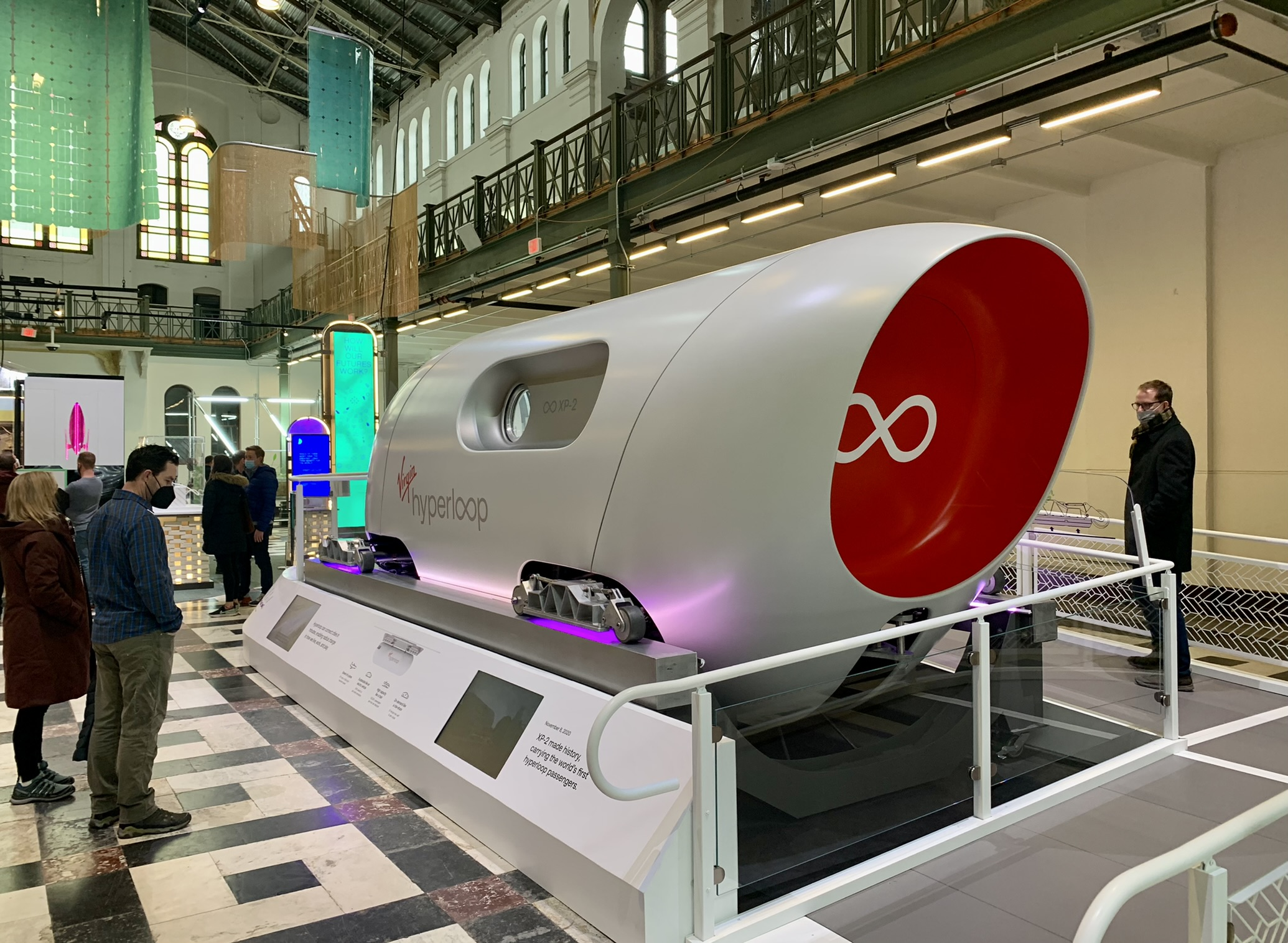
Rear view

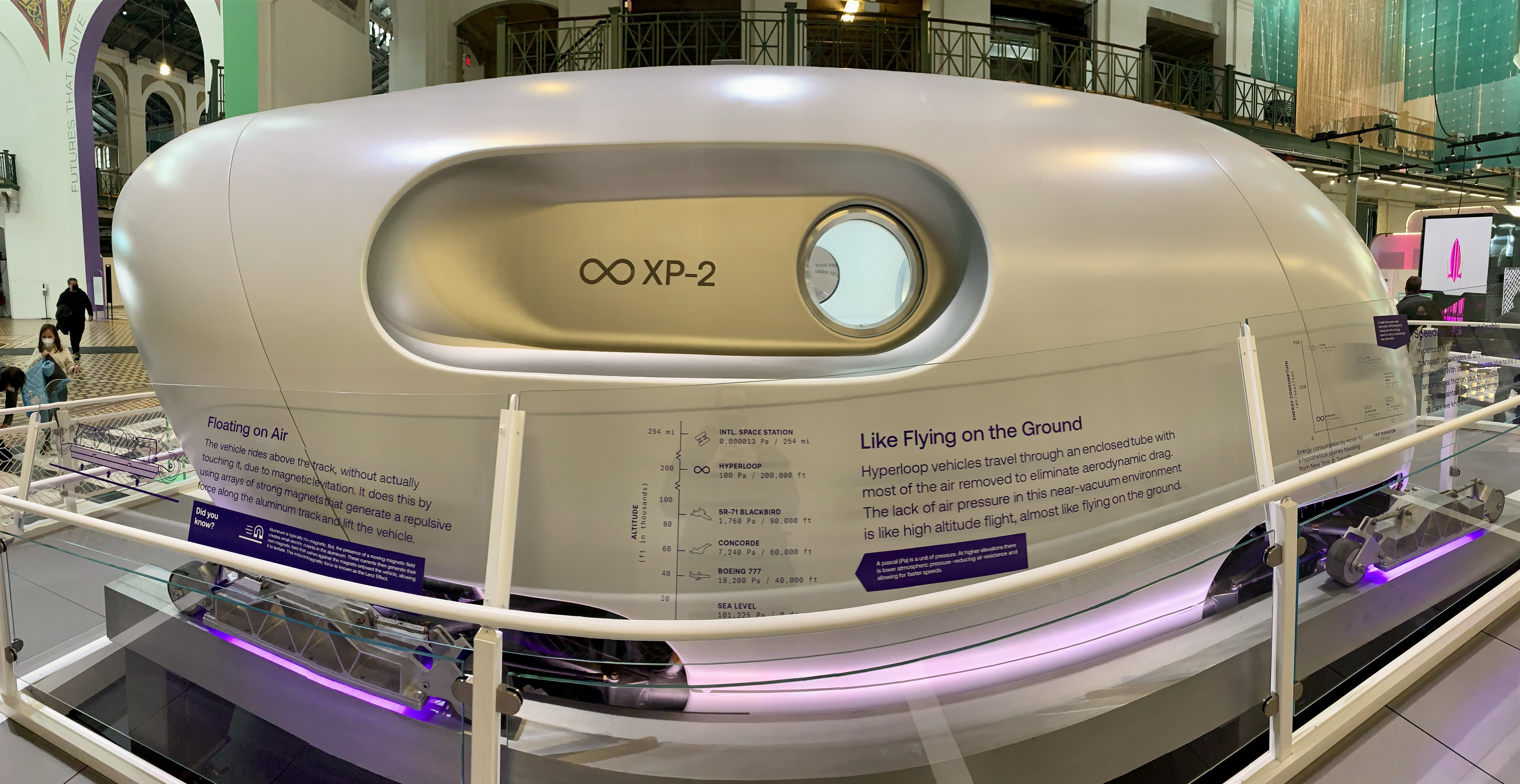
Side view

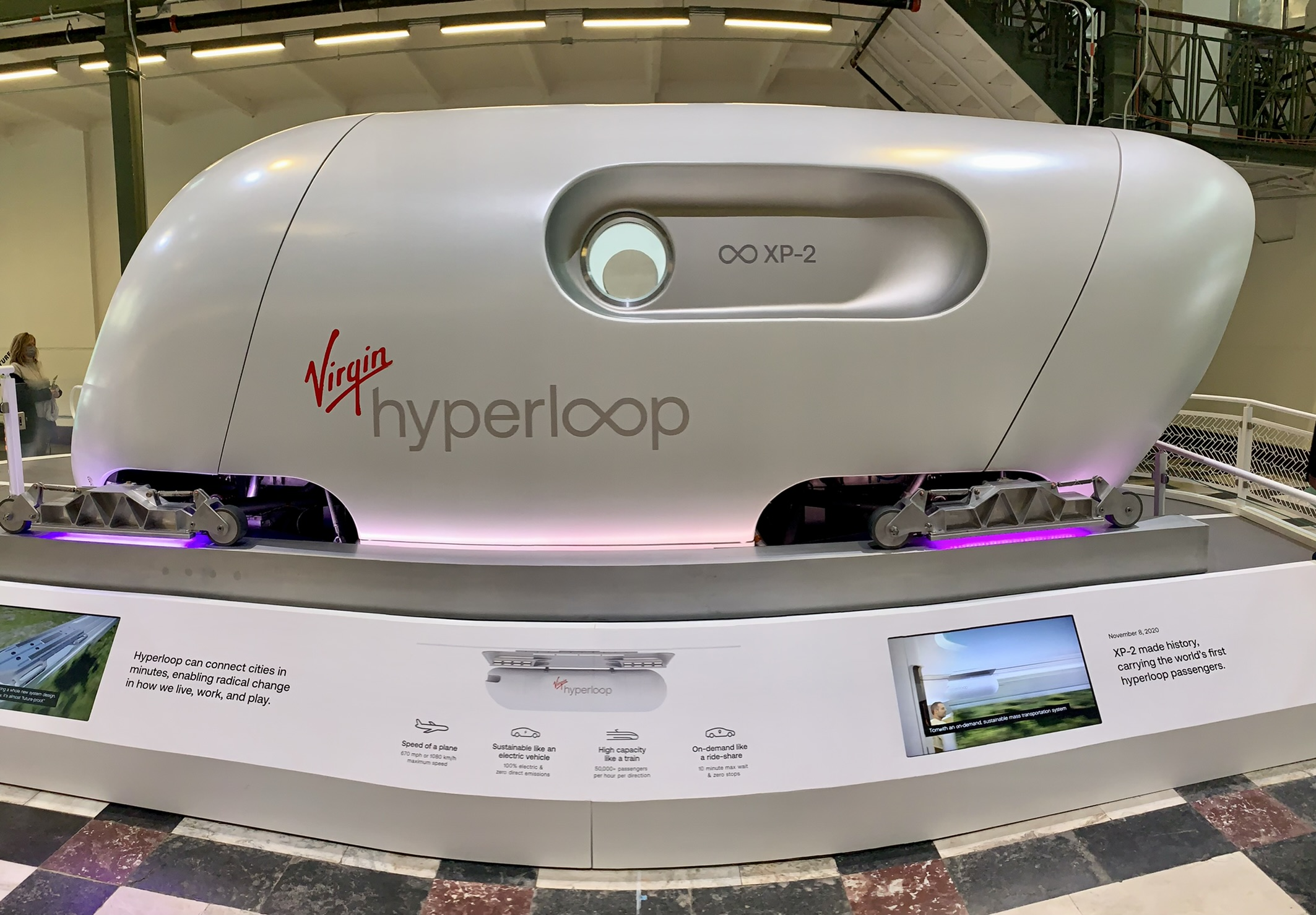
Side view

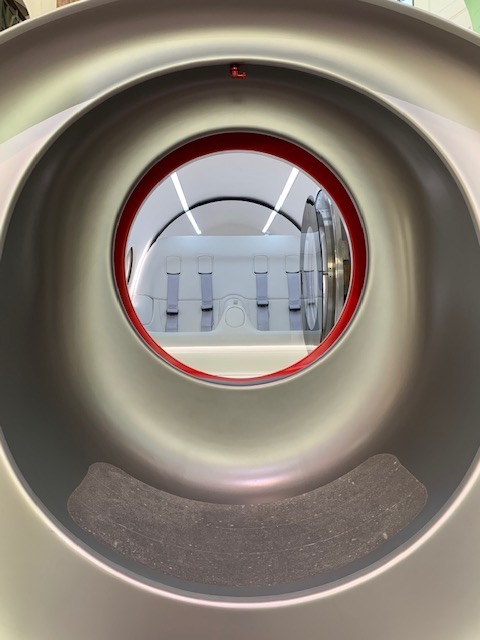
Interior view

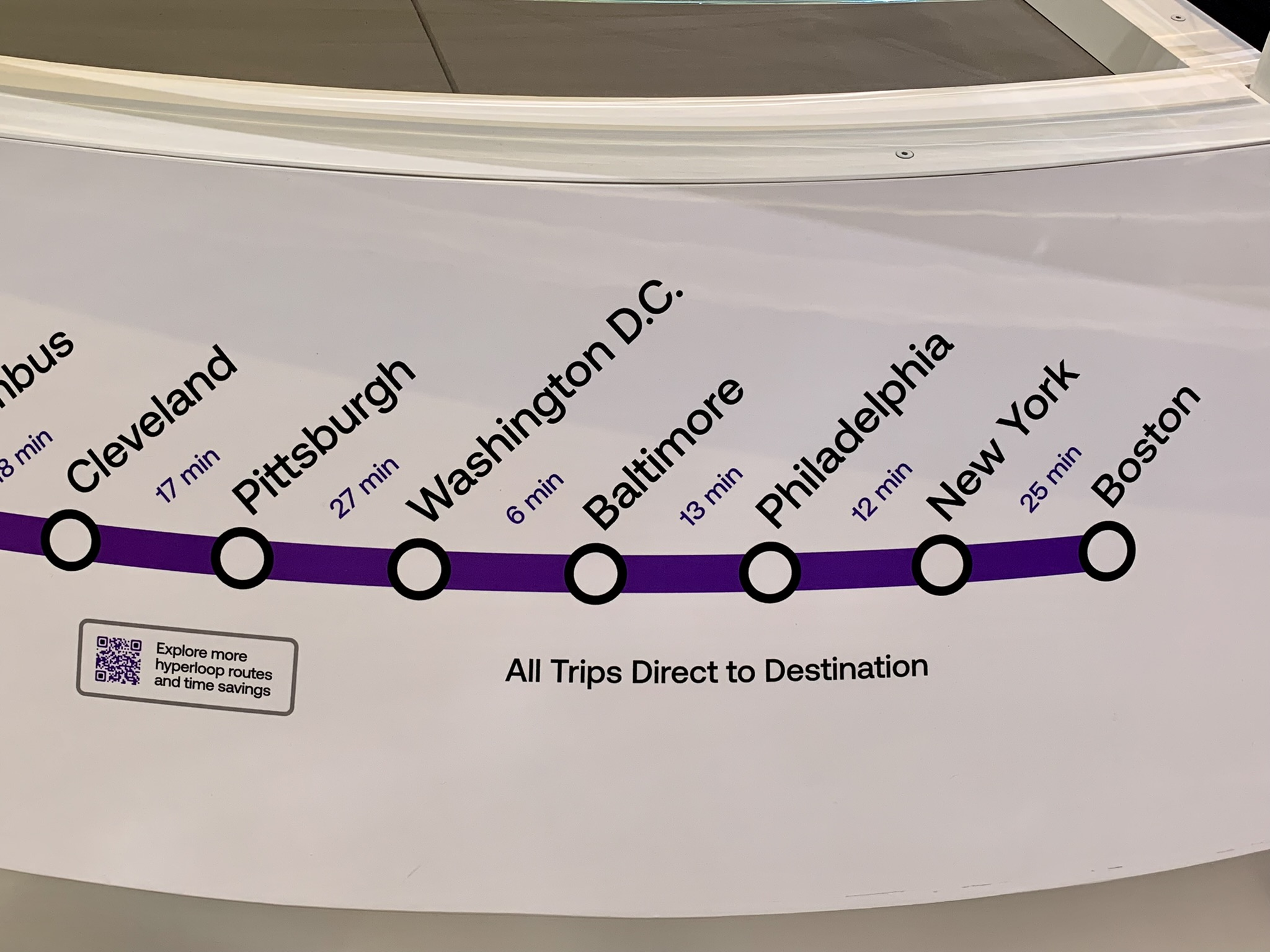
Estimated travel time

For the company's passenger testing, they created a new vehicle, dubbed "experimental pod 2", or XP-2. The vehicle was designed by Bjarke Ingels Group and Kilo Design.

On November 8, 2020, after more than 400 uncrewed tests, the firm conducted the first human trial with Josh Giegel, its co-founder and CTO, and Sara Luchian, Director of Passenger Experience, as the first passengers at a speed of 172 km/h (107 mph) at its DevLoop test site in Las Vegas, Nevada. The test was conducted in a near-vacuum environment of 100 Pascals.

In March 2021, Virgin Hyperloop announced that the vehicle would be on display at the Smithsonian's Arts and Industries Building in late 2021.

Following successful passenger testing, Virgin Hyperloop unveiled its commercial vehicle design in January 2021. Designed in collaboration with Seattle-based design firm Teague, each vehicle is planned to seat about 28 passengers but can transport thousands of passengers per hour in convoys.

== Funding ==
Hyperloop One had raised over $485 million as of May 2019. Its investors include Sherpa Capital, Formation 8, 137 Ventures, DP World, Khosla Ventures, Caspian Venture Capital, Fast Digital, Western Technology Investment, Zhen Fund, GE Ventures, and SNCF.

== Management ==
As of July 2018, the board of directors included Richard Branson (chairman), Justin Fishner-Wolfson, Sultan Ahmed Bin Sulayem, Rob Lloyd, Josh Giegel, Bill Shor, Yuvraj Narayan, Anatoly Braverman, and Emily White as a strategic adviser. Former board members include Peter Diamandis, Jim Messina, who as of July 2018 serves as strategic adviser, former Morgan Stanley executive Jim Rosenthal, Joe Lonsdale, the co-founder Shervin Pishevar, who took a leave of absence from Hyperloop One in December 2017 after multiple women accused him of sexual misconduct, and Ziyavudin Magomedov, a Russian billionaire who was arrested on embezzlement charges in 2018.

On November 8, 2018, Sultan Ahmed bin Sulayem succeeded Richard Branson as chairman.

In February 2021, co-founder Josh Giegel was named CEO, before being replaced by CFO Raja Narayanan in October 2021. The firm announced an intent to accelerate scheduled fielding of production systems from the early 2030s to the mid-2020s, and that the planned initial project would transport freight between the cities of Dubai and Abu Dhabi in the United Arab Emirates.

== Planned cooperation ==
In June 2016 the company announced a memorandum of understanding with the Summa Group and the Russian government to construct a hyperloop in Moscow and has since completed feasibility studies in Moscow and in the Far East.

In August 2016, the firm announced a deal with the world's third largest ports operator, DP World, to develop a cargo offloader system at Jebel Ali in Dubai. On November 8, 2016, the firm announced it had signed a deal with Dubai's Roads and Transport Authority (RTA) to conduct feasibility studies on potential passenger and cargo hyperloop routes in the United Arab Emirates.

By April 2017, the firm had feasibility studies underway in the United Arab Emirates, Finland, Sweden, the Netherlands, Switzerland, Moscow, and the UK. On September 1, 2017, the firm signed a letter of intent with Estonia to cooperate on the Helsinki–Tallinn Tunnel.

In February 2018, the Virgin Group signed an "intent agreement" with the Government of Maharashtra state of India to build a hyperloop transportation system between Mumbai and Pune. In August 2019, the government deemed hyperloop a public infrastructure project and approved the Virgin Hyperloop-DP World Consortium as the Original Project Proponent (OPP), recognizing hyperloop technology alongside other more traditional forms of mass transit. The Principal Scientific Adviser to the Government of India, K. VijayRaghavan, set up a Consultative Group on Future of Transportation (CGFT) to explore the regulatory path for hyperloop.

On July 19, 2018, an Ohio regional planning commission was investigating using hyperloop between airports and potentially between Chicago, Columbus, and Pittsburgh; in May 2020 the commission released the results of their Midwest Connect feasibility study, which found that the route would create $300 billion in overall economic benefits and reduce CO_{2} emission by 2.4 million tons.

In July 2018, Texas officials announced that the state will explore hyperloop technology for a route connecting Dallas, Austin, San Antonio, and Laredo. In June 2019, the firm announced an ongoing collaboration with the Sam Fox School of Washington University in St. Louis to explore proposals for the Missouri Hyperloop. In October 2019, Missouri became the first US state to conduct a hyperloop feasibility study, exploring a route between Kansas City and St. Louis.

In December 2019, the State Government of Punjab, India, signed an MoU with the firm to explore a route connecting the Amritsar-Ludhiana-Chandigarh corridor.

In February 2020, the firm signed a partnership agreement with Saudi Arabia to conduct a pre-feasibility study. In September 2020, Virgin Hyperloop signed a partnership agreement with Bangalore International Airport Limited to conduct a feasibility study for a proposed corridor from BLR Airport.

== Hyperloop One Global Challenge ==
In 2016, the firm launched its Hyperloop One Global Challenge to find the locations for, develop, and construct the world's first hyperloop networks. In January 2017, the firm announced the 35 semifinalist routes (spread over 17 countries) and held a series of events showcasing the semifinalists, Vision for India in February, Vision for America in April and Vision for Europe in June. On September 14, 2017, Hyperloop One announced the 10 winners; they were to be invited to work closely with the firm on viability studies to try to bring their respective loops from proposal to reality.

The ten winning routes that were selected are:

#	Country	Route
1	United States	Chicago to Columbus to Pittsburgh
2	United States	Dallas to Laredo to Houston
3	United States	Cheyenne to Denver to Pueblo
4	United States	Miami to Orlando
5	Canada	Toronto to Ottawa to Montreal
6	Mexico	Mexico City to Guadalajara
7	United Kingdom	Edinburgh to London
8	United Kingdom	Glasgow to Liverpool
9	India	Bengaluru (Bangalore) to Chennai
10	India	Mumbai to Pune

== Lawsuits ==
In July 2016, the CTO and co-founder Brogan BamBrogan left the company, later filing a lawsuit with three other former employees alleging breach of fiduciary duty and misuse of corporate resources. On July 19, 2016, Hyperloop One filed a counterclaim against the four former employees, alleging they staged a failed coup of the company, in the process breaching agreements around fiduciary duty, non-competes, proprietary information, and non-disparagement, as well as intentional interference with contractual relations. On November 18, 2016, both parties agreed to settle the lawsuit. Terms were confidential and not disclosed. BamBrogan and other former Hyperloop One and SpaceX employees went on to found Arrivo, another Hyperloop company (defunct in 2018).
