= Black & Veatch =

American multinational engineering and construction company

Coordinates: 38.923941°N 94.656570°W

- Type: Employee-owned
- Industry: Engineering, procurement and construction, and consulting
- Founded: Kansas City, Missouri (1915)
- Headquarters: Overland Park, Kansas
- Areas served: Power, water, private telecommunications, oil and gas, mining, government, data centers
- Key people: Mario Azar, Chairman and CEO Steve Meck, General Counsel and Chief Compliance Officer Michael Williams, Chief Financial Officer Katie Johnson, Vice President and Chief of Staff Mike Adams, Chief Digital Technology Officer Patrick Hogan, Chief Business Evolution Officer Andrea Bernica, Chief People Officer Jennifer Divito, President, Black & Veatch Operations Narsingh Chaudhary, President, Fuels & Natural Resources Todd Edsall, President, Power Providers Jim Moos, President, Technology, Industrial & Governments Charlie Sanchez, President, Infrastructure Advisory Jerin Raj, Senior Vice President, Managing Director and Head of Asia Pacific and India Rafael (Rafa) E. Frias III, Managing Director, Europe, Middle East and Africa
- Services: Asset management, consulting, data analytics, EPC and design build, operations, physical and cybersecurity, program and construction management, sustainability, construction
- Revenue: $5.1 billion (2025)
- Number of employees: More than 13,000 (2025)
- Website: www.bv.com

Black & Veatch (BV) is a global engineering, procurement, consulting and construction company based in the Kansas City metropolitan area. Founded in 1915 in Kansas City, Missouri, it is now headquartered in Overland Park, Kansas. It specializes in infrastructure development in energy, liquefied natural gas, water, renewable energy including solar, private telecommunications, government, mining, data centers, cybersecurity, advisory services, electrified transportation and smart cities.

As of October 2025, BV is the 6th largest 100% employee-owned company in the United States with approximately 13,000 employees and reported total revenue of $5.1 billion. According to Engineering-News Record (ENR) magazine, Black & Veatch is the 14th-largest design firm in the United States based on revenue for design services performed in 2025. In its annual ENR 500 rankings, the magazine also reports that Black & Veatch is the nation's 6th largest provider of design services to the Power market, 8th largest in Water, 15th in Industrial Process, Oil & Gas, and 16th in International Markets. Further, Black & Veatch ranks 49th in the top 400 contractors, 13th in the top 50 contractors working abroad, and 33rd for the top 100 contractors by new contracts.

BV has more than 100 offices worldwide and has completed projects in more than 100 countries on six continents.

== History ==
Black & Veatch was formed in 1915 when Ernest Bateman (E.B.) Black dissolved his partnership with J.S. Worley and created a new firm with Nathan Thomas Veatch. Black and Veatch met while attending the University of Kansas.

== Company timeline ==
- 1915 Ernest Bateman Black and Nathan Thomas Veatch form a partnership called Black & Veatch with 12 employees on the payroll.
- 1940 The War Department requests that Black & Veatch rebuild Camp Robinson in Little Rock, Arkansas. Other camp projects include Camp Chaffee in Fort Smith, Arkansas, Camp Hale in Pando, Colorado, and other military installations in the Midwest.
- 1948 Work begins for the Atomic Energy Commission at Los Alamos, New Mexico.
- 1950 N.T. Veatch is appointed by President Harry Truman to the President's Water Pollution Control Advisory Board.
- 1963 Black & Veatch International is formed.
- 1964 Black & Veatch opens its first regional office in Denver, CO to design a 100 million gallon per day water treatment plant by the Denver Water Board of Colorado.
- 1967 Black & Veatch wins a contract to produce a 60-megawatt power generating unit for Yanhee Electricity Authority of Thailand, now known as EGAT, Electricity Generating Authority of Thailand.
- 1976 Black & Veatch opens new building at 11401 Lamar Avenue in Overland Park, Kansas.
- 1985 Black & Veatch acquires Pritchard Corporation and its PRICO liquefaction technology.
- 1988 Black & Veatch power division introduces a new computer-aided engineering and project management system called POWRTRAK to be more time efficient and capture new business.
- 1996 Black & Veatch expands building at 11401 Lamar Avenue.
- 1999 Black & Veatch changes company structure from general partnership to an employee-owned corporation.
- 2009 Black & Veatch repurchases 11401 Lamar Avenue office building in Overland Park, Kansas, and establishes the location as the company's World Headquarters.
- 2013 Steve Edwards assumes role as Black & Veatch Chairman, President, and CEO.
- 2015 Black & Veatch celebrates its 100th anniversary.
- 2017 Black & Veatch forms Diode Ventures, LLC, "a land use developer that takes the complexity out of preparing infrastructure for the digital future."
- 2018 Black & Veatch and the University of Missouri release a report on the Missouri Hyperloop
- 2020 Black & Veatch announces it is ceasing participation in new coal-based design and construction projects in an attempt to focus on more renewable energy work.
- 2021 The Europe and Asian water businesses of Black & Veatch are acquired by RSK Group and renamed Binnies.
- 2022 Mario Azar succeeds the retiring Steve Edwards as Chairman & CEO
- 2023 Black & Veatch acquires Texas-based electrical contractor and storm restoration expert Bird Electric Enterprises, LLC, adding 600 employees in the process.
- 2023 Black & Veatch completes charging depot for Schneider National to its power zero-emissions fleet.
- 2024 Black & Veatch establishes a global Operational Technology (OT) cybersecurity practice to protect critical infrastructure assets from hackers and cybercriminals

== Construction ==
Black & Veatch holds several subsidiary companies, including Overland Contracting Inc., Black & Veatch Construction Inc. and Bird Electric.

Overland Contracting Inc.

Overland Contracting Inc.® (OCI) is a Black & Veatch company that was established in 1996. It provides construction services in open and merit shop markets. Since its inception, it has been involved in building vital infrastructure. The company leverages on the integrated capabilities of Black & Veatch. OCI Website outlines the company’s goals of safe, timely delivery, and cost-effectiveness of its infrastructure projects.

Black & Veatch Construction, Inc.

Established in 1991, Black & Veatch Construction, Inc. (BVCI) is a leading engineering, procurement and construction company providing union construction solutions for on-time and on-budget project delivery. BVCI tailors its approach to meet clients’ needs in construction, project and program management, project controls, procurement and engineering for the power, water, digital connectivity and government markets. An employee-owned company, BVCI self-performs construction with a focus on safety, quality, cost, schedule and client satisfaction.

Bird Electric

Acquired in May 2023, Bird Electric, a Black & Veatch company, is a U.S. self-perform electrical construction services provider with a national reach in emergency power restoration. With more than 600 employees, Bird Electric delivers grid solutions and operates in adjacent distributed infrastructure markets including renewables, electric vehicle charging, and connectivity. The company also has long-established relationships with fuel producers and energy providers. Bird Electric offers an industry-leading safety record and apprenticeship program certified by the U.S. Department of Labor.

== Ukraine arm: BTRIC ==
In 2008, the Defense Threat 123 Agency (DTRA) awarded BV the first of its Biological Threat Reduction Integrating Contracts (BTRIC). The five-year IDIQ contract has a collective ceiling of $4 billion among the five selected contractors. DTRA awarded BV, as Integrating Contractor, the first BTRIC in Ukraine in 2008, which "is a vital part" of the Cooperative Threat Reduction (CTR) and Biological Threat Reduction (BTR) program of the DTRA. The Implementing (Executive) Agents were three in number: the Ukraine Ministry of Health, Ukraine Academy of Agrarian Sciences and Ukraine State Committee for Veterinary Medicine.

In 2010, BV commissioned Ukraine's first Bio-Safety Level 3 laboratory. This was the first BSL-3 laboratory commissioned for the DTRA. Constructed by Black & Veatch under the "to renovate a decades-old facility into a state-of-the-art diagnostics laboratory that will become the nexus of Ukraine's biosurveillance network... Ukrainian personnel in molecular diagnostics, biosafety, operations and maintenance, and laboratory management techniques" were trained over three years from 2010 to "provide Ukrainian scientists with the necessary resources to manage the BSL-3 laboratory and the Ukrainian biosurveillance system."

Some social media users have attempted to link Black & Veatch to conspiracy theories related to the war in Ukraine and the origins of the COVID-19 pandemic through this biosurveillance facility development and the dates of various executed agreements. Per the Associated Press, "The government initially signed an agreement in late 2019 with a contractor, Black & Veatch, as part of biological threat reduction work in Ukraine, according to officials and documents. After the pandemic began, Black & Veatch hired another firm, Labyrinth Gold Health, to provide expertise for Ukraine's COVID-19 response. The description of the work in a federal database was updated, but the original agreement date remained."
