= Missouri Hyperloop =

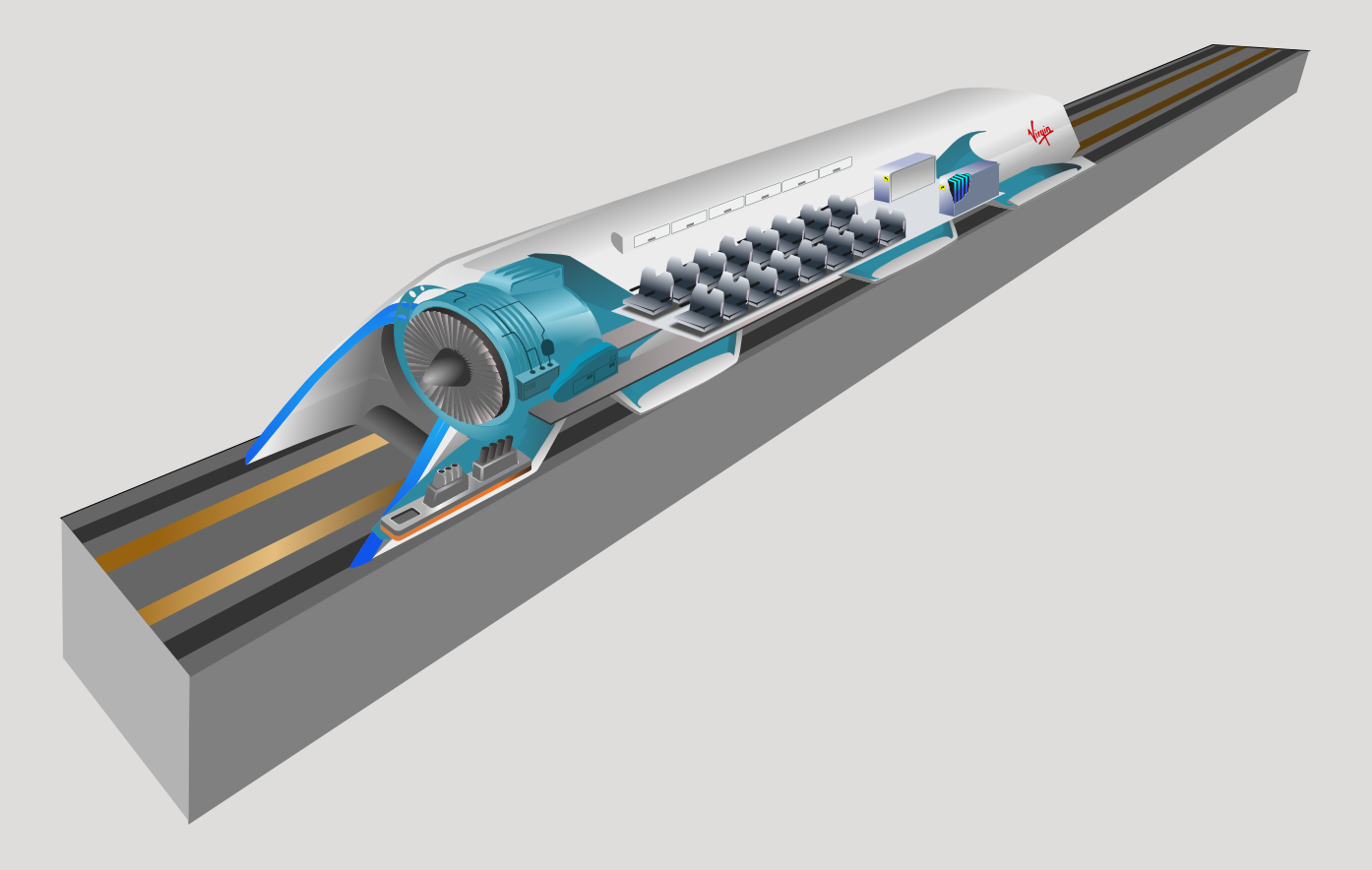
Concept of a Virgin Hyperloop

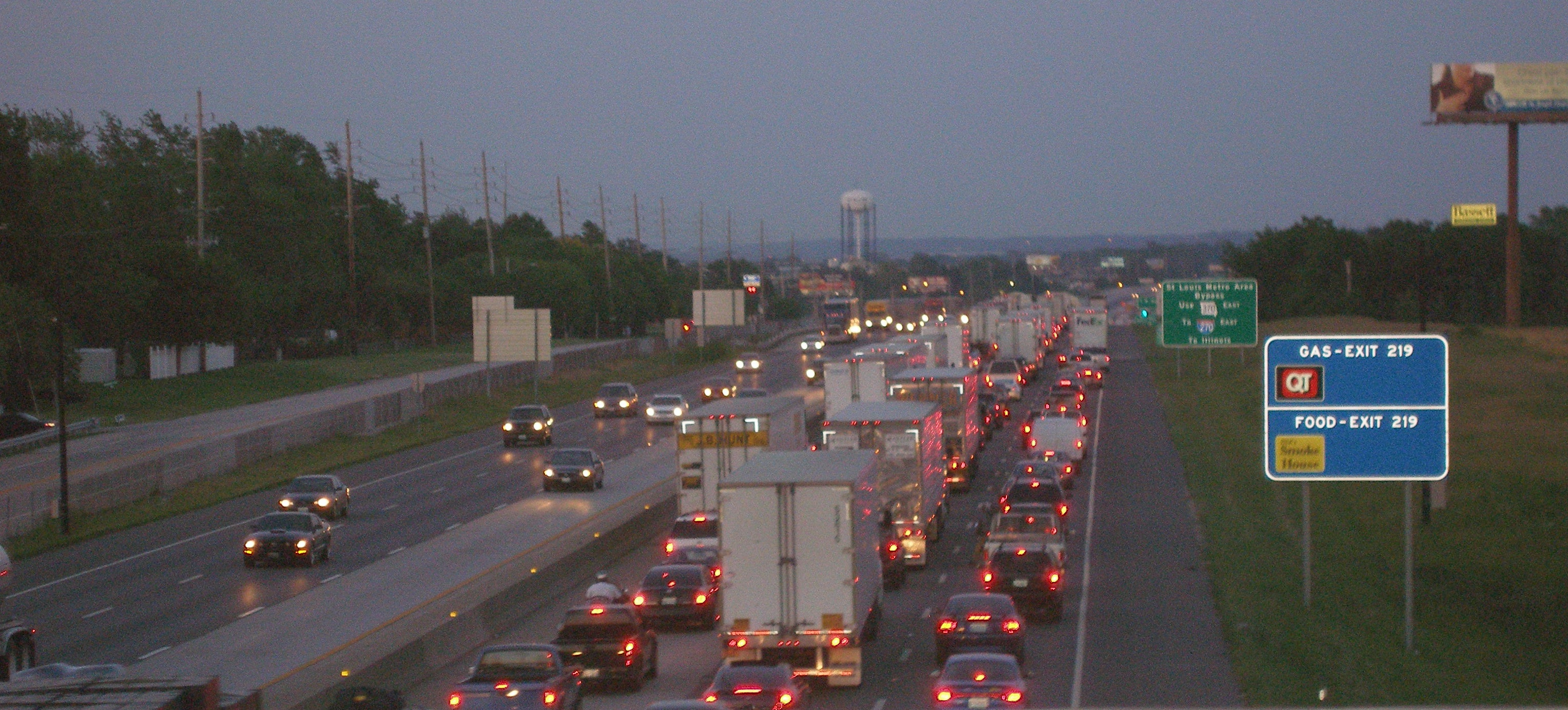
Heavy traffic along I-70 west of St. Louis

The Missouri Hyperloop was a proposed high-speed transportation route in the U.S. state of Missouri. The hyperloop would connect the cities of St. Louis, Columbia, and Kansas City, complementing the busy Interstate 70. Cross-state travel between Missouri's two largest cities would be reduced from four hours to under 30 minutes.

In 2017, the Missouri Hyperloop Coalition was formed as a partnership between Virgin Hyperloop One, the University of Missouri, and engineering firm Black & Veatch. The coalition released a report that concluded such a hyperloop was feasible, the first such study in the United States. It touts benefits including annual savings of $500 million, fast and cheap travel for over 5 million people in Missouri's two largest metropolitan areas, and connecting technology and research centers including the University of Missouri.

In 2019, Missouri Governor Mike Parson announced the formation of a Blue Ribbon panel to examine the details of funding and construction, including a potential 10–15-mile (16–24 km) test track. The corridor has been described as an ideal location because of its relative flatness, population density, and preexisting infrastructure. Virgin Hyperloop CEO Jay Walder referred to Missouri as a "model process" for planning hyperloops.

In June 2019, Virgin Hyperloop One announced a partnership with the Sam Fox School of Design & Visual Arts of Washington University in St. Louis to further investigate different proposals for the Missouri Hyperloop.

In October 2020, West Virginia was announced as the location for the test track, though this was never constructed. In December 2023, Hyperloop One announced it was shutting down after failing to obtain any contracts to build a working system.
