= Munchery =

Online food ordering and meal delivery service

Munchery Inc.
- Type: Private
- Industry: Hospitality
- Founded: 2010; 16 years ago
- Founders: Tri Tran; Conrad Chu
- Defunct: January 21, 2019
- Fate: Bankruptcy
- Headquarters: San Francisco, California, United States
- Key people: James Beriker (CEO)
- Website: munchery.com

Munchery Inc. was an online food ordering and meal delivery service that served parts of San Francisco, Seattle, and New York City. The company shut down abruptly on January 21, 2019. It was valued at $300 million. The website subsequently relaunched as a recipes-only site operated by Rolliyo, Inc., a DE corporation doing business as Munchery.

== Overview ==
Munchery was a conglomeration of chefs who offered continually changing menus to users. Chefs chose their dishes and sourced ingredients, and users rated the meals. Meals could be ordered up to 6 p.m. the same day or a few days in advance. A fleet of drivers delivered the dinners within a chosen one-hour window between 5 and 9 p.m.. The chilled food needed to be reheated before serving. After trying the meals, diners could post reviews online, and they could also directly message chefs through the site.

== History ==
Munchery was founded in 2010 in San Francisco, California by Tri Tran and Conrad Chu.

In 2015 the company raised $85 million in Series C funding and was speculated to be valued at $300 million, though a company spokesperson did not confirm that number.

In 2016, the company launched a corporate lunch delivery program. James Beriker became CEO, taking the place of co-founder Tri Tran.

On October 2, 2020, Rolliyo, Inc., a DE corporation doing business as ("DBA") Munchery.com, sent an email to Munchery, Inc's email list announcing that "Munchery is back (as a recipe site)."

== Bankruptcy ==
In late 2018 the company laid off 30 percent of its employees. In January 2019 Munchery abruptly ceased all operations. In a March 2019 bankruptcy declaration, the company claimed assets between $1 and $10 million with liabilities totaling $28.5 million in secured debt to lenders as well as $6 million in unsecured debt to its 230 vendors and suppliers. In all, investors — Greycroft, Sherpa Capital, Menlo Ventures, E.ventures, Cota Capital, and M13 — sank $125 million in the company, with an $87 million round in 2015.

“To be honest, it was a house of cards,” said an anonymous chef who worked at Munchery for two years.

In May 2019 the bankrupt company sold its 70,000-square-foot South San Francisco headquarters for $5 million. Munchery's CEO James Beriker planned to pay himself a $250,000 “success fee” for the sale of the company's headquarters and other assets.
