= Goodwill Easter Seals Miami Valley =

Organization

- Founded: 1934
- Type: Non-Profit - Community Services
- Purpose: Services and support for individuals with disabilities or other disadvantages
- Headquarters: 660 S. Main St, Dayton, OH 45402
- Region served: Miami Valley, Ohio
- Employees: Over 1200
- Website: www.gesmv.org
- Formerly called: Goodwill Industries of the Miami Valley; Easter Seals of West Central Ohio

Goodwill Easter Seals Miami Valley is a nonprofit organization serving the Miami Valley of Ohio with offices in Dayton and Lima. It provides services and support for individuals with disabilities and other disadvantages in achieving independence for a better quality of life. It was reported in 2010 that the organization had become "one of Dayton’s 25 fastest growing companies."

== History ==
In 1934, it was started as Goodwill Industries of the Miami Valley. It focused on assisting people to live independently through job training and job placement services.

In 1999, it started working with the Easter Seals of West Central Ohio. In 2006 they officially merged into one organization.

== Operations ==
The organization operates in a 23 county region, with more than 1,200 employees.
