= Vestergaard (company) =

Company headquartered in Lausanne, Switzerland

- Type: Private
- Industry: Public health Technical textile Food security
- Founded: 1957
- Founder: Kaj Vestergaard Frandsen
- Headquarters: Switzerland
- Area served: World-wide
- Key people: Amar Ali; (CEO); Board members: Bill Burns (Chairman); Mikkel Vestergaard Frandsen; Michael Francis; Ido Leffler; Peter Piot; Josette Sheeran
- Products: Mosquito nets, Pest Control
- Brands: PermaNet, ZeroFly, Tiny Targets
- Owner: Mikkel Vestergaard Frandsen
- Number of employees: 110
- Website: www.vestergaard.com

Vestergaard is a Swiss- and United States-based social enterprise that develops and manufactures insecticide-treated fabrics for public health and agricultural pest control. Its health innovations include the PermaNet product line of long-lasting insecticidal mosquito nets, widely used in malaria elimination programs, and Tiny Targets, which reduce the transmission of sleeping sickness by the Tsetse fly. In agriculture, the company has adapted its insecticidal netting technology for commercial crop protection in the U.S., as well as developing ZeroFly grain storage bags, to enhance food security in low- and middle-income countries.

Founded in 1957 as Vestergaard Frandsen, the company is headquartered in Lausanne, Switzerland, with research and innovation led from the United States. Global manufacturing operations are based in Vietnam with local manufacturing in Nigeria through Health Textiles Nigeria FZE. Entomological research and testing is carried out at the Vestergaard-Noguchi Vector Labs in Ghana.

The company began as a uniform maker and evolved into a social enterprise making products for humanitarian aid in the 1990s. It is also known for inventing the LifeStraw water filter (now a separate company).

== History ==
Vestergaard was founded in 1957 by Kaj Vestergaard Frandsen, a former farmer and the grandfather of current owner Mikkel Vestergaard Frandsen. Kaj founded the company with a friend before doing it alone. The company made linings for jackets and uniforms. Kaj's son Torben took over in 1970. Production was first moved to Ireland and then to Poland in 1989.

In 1990, Torben bought up 1 million yards of Swedish army surplus fabric used for uniforms, and turned it into blankets for aid organizations. That was the beginning of a change in focus of the company that continued after Mikkel was persuaded to join the company by his father in 1993. Mikkel had worked in Lagos from the age of 19 running a truck company, which "ignited his passion for Africa." He left Nigeria following a military coup and returned to Denmark to work with his father. In 1997 Torben and Mikkel agreed to split the company into separate female uniform and humanitarian textiles businesses, and then Mikkel bought out his father and stopped producing uniforms.

Under Mikkel's leadership the company increased its focused on product innovation that improves the lives of people and makes a profit in order to reinvest in continued innovation - an approach that he refers to as humanitarian entrepreneurship.

The company's PermaNet bed nets were launched in 1999, ZeroFly entered the market in 2004, and LifeStraw was introduced in 2005. A second ZeroFly product, insecticide-treated storage bags, were launched in 2015. Those products align with Vestergaard's commitment to the Sustainable Development Goals: public health and food security.

The company moved headquarters from Kolding to Lausanne in 2005–6, which it said was to better attract specialist employees and due to the presence of international organizations such as UN agencies and the Red Cross in Switzerland. In 2010, the company was around 20 times the size of when Mikkel joined it. Vestergaard has been a member of the UN Global Compact since 2008 and initiated, then participated in the Bed Net Industry Dialogue hosted by the Global Business Coalition in 2009.

In 2011, the Vestergaard-Noguchi Vector Labs (VNVL) opened in Ghana. The partnership with the Noguchi Memorial Institute of Medical Research (NMIMR) supports research, development, and testing of PermaNet bed nets as well as studies on how mosquitoes react to insecticides. The facility also hosts and trains scientists, including recent graduates, under the Ghana National Service Scheme.

In 2012, Vestergaard, in partnership with Kenya Medical Research Institute - Centre for Global Health Research (KEMRI-CGHR), ESRI Eastern Africa, and others, developed IR Mapper, an online tool for mapping insecticide resistance.

Mikkel Vestergaard Frandsen stepped down as CEO in January 2020 and was replaced by Michael Joos. In 2023, Amar Ali was named CEO.

Vestergaard became a certified B Corporation in 2021. In 2024, the company signed a MOU with the Government of Nigeria as a first step towards establishing the first West African manufacturing hub for insecticide-treated nets. Health Textiles Nigeria FZE, a wholly owned Vestergaard facility located in the Lagos Free Zone in Lagos State, produces PermaNet Dual. Production began in September 2026, making Health Textiles Nigeria the first facility in the country to manufacture dual active-ingredient insecticide-treated nets. At full capacity, the facility is expected to produce about 10 million nets annually and employ more than 600 people.

Also in 2024, Vestergaard collaborated with Penn State University researchers and mushroom growers to expand its insecticide-treated netting technology into agricultural pest control. The technology, originally developed for malaria prevention, was adapted for use against phorid (scuttle) flies in commercial mushroom farming. Sher-Rockee Mushroom Farms in Chester County, Pennsylvania, was among the first to use the technology and reported a significant reduction in crop loss after its adoption. The American Mushroom Institute has since discussed broader funding and regulatory support for the approach.

In 2025, Vestergaard endorsed the Kigali Declaration on NTDs. The declaration recognizes a political and community commitment to eliminate NTDs (Neglected Tropical Diseases) including the ongoing commitment to donate Tiny Targets, a vector control product that supports the elimination of sleeping sickness.

The Vestergaard-Noguchi partnership marked 15 years in 2026. During this period, VNVL expanded its testing capabilities and formal quality management systems, while building up local research capacity by training Ghanaian scientists and technicians to carry out product evaluations. A longstanding collaboration with Ghana's National Malaria Elimination Programme is guided by a tripartite memorandum of understanding, formalized in 2025, that provides a framework for linking laboratory research with national malaria control activities.

== Products ==
Vestergaard continues to work on product innovations for vector borne illnesses, crop protection and food security.

- PermaNet: The PermaNet products are polyester mosquito nets coated with the long-lasting insecticide deltamethrin (a pyrethroid) to prevent malaria. PermaNet 2.0 nets, which received recommendation by WHOPES in 2004, converted to World Health Organization (WHO) prequalification in 2017, are pyrethroid-only. PermaNet 3.0 nets, which received recommendation by WHOPES in 2008, converted to WHO prequalification in 2018, use a polyethylene roof incorporated with pyrethroid-piperonyl butoxide (PBO). PermaNet Dual, prequalified by the WHO in 2023, was the second dual active ingredient (pyrethroid-chlorfenapyr) net to market, designed to combat insecticide resistance. Vestergaard is the largest producer of insecticide-treated bed nets and has distributed more than a billion nets as of 2023.
- ZeroFly: The ZeroFly products are insecticide-treated materials, including tarpaulins and storage bags, that are a defence against insect pests for livestock and crop protection. ZeroFly storage bags are now manufactured and produced by the Nigerian Bag Manufacturing Company (BAGCO).
- Tiny Targets: Tiny Targets are an insecticide-treated fabric designed to combat the tsetse fly that transmits sleeping sickness (Human African Trypanosomiasis). Vestergaard developed the fabric panels in collaboration with the Liverpool School of Tropical Medicine (LSTM). Since 2015, the company has been partnering with HAT control programmes administered by LSTM, FIND, the Institute of Tropical Medicine (ITM), and Institut de recherche pour le développement (IRD). Tiny Targets have been donated since 2020, and the company pledged in 2025 to continue donating up to 150,000 every year to help meet the WHO’s 2030 elimination target for the disease.

== Recognition ==
The company was named as a Fast Company Top 50 company in 2007. The company won The Economist’s Social and Economic Innovation Award in 2009. In 2024, the LSTM, a Vestergaard partner on the Tiny Targets project, was awarded a Queen’s Anniversary Prize for Tiny Targets.
