= Kids In Need Foundation =

American non-profit organization

- Formation: 1995
- Type: 501(c)(3) charity
- Purpose: Children's education
- Location: Roseville, Minnesota, U.S.
- Region served: National
- Method: School supplies, and grants for teachers
- Key people: Corey Gordon (CEO)
- Website: www.kinf.org

The Kids In Need Foundation is an American national 501(c)(3) charity that believes every child in America should have equal opportunity and access to a quality education. By partnering with teachers and students in under-resourced schools, Kids In Need Foundation provides the supplies and resources needed for teachers to teach and learners to learn.

== Programs ==
=== Second Responder ===
The Second Responder program operates during the recovery period following the devastation, once the critical necessities of food, shelter, and medical aid are in place.

=== School Ready Supplies ===
KINF partners with corporations and philanthropic organizations throughout the country to provide completely assembled school supply backpacks to students who otherwise would have to do without the basic tools for learning.

=== Supply A Teacher ===
KINF's Supply A Teacher program seeks to remove the burden of having to provide necessary resources from teachers in underserved schools. Every teacher supported through the program receives two boxes of items they need to fuel a full semester of active learning. Donors can fund a teacher, school, or entire school district they'd like to support.

=== Teacher Resource Center ===
The nonprofit has a teacher resource center, which as of 2025, serves 15,000 educators in Minnesota. The center has resources and supplies for teachers to use in their classrooms and is sponsored in part by the Minnesota Vikings and Pepsi. Teachers at schools where more than 50% of students qualify for free and reduced lunch are able to come to the center quarterly to get free supplies. The center was previously located in Roseville, Minnesota, however, in July 2025, the organization expanded to a 74,000-square-foot facility in Little Canada, Minnesota. In 2026, the foundation gifted $1 million worth of supplies to teachers.

== National Network of Resource Centers (2020) ==
KINF partners with 42 organizations across the country to help distribute much-needed school supplies to students who would otherwise go without.

These organizations focus on schools with high percentages of students enrolled in the federal free and reduced lunch program. With the generous support of donors, sponsors, and national product partners, KINF supplies them with the basic tools needed to learn and succeed in school.

- A Gift For Teaching – Orlando, Fla.
- Atlanta Kids In Need Resource Center/Empty Stocking Fund – Atlanta, Ga.
- Back To School Teachers' Store – Muncie, Ind.
- Classroom Central – Charlotte, N.C.
- Cleveland Kids In Need Resource Center – Cleveland, Ohio
- Crayons to Classrooms – Dayton, Ohio
- Crayons to Computers – Cincinnati, Ohio
- Equipped 2 Teach – Utica, N.Y.
- Kids In Need Foundation Resource Center – Minneapolis, Minn.
- Kids In Need Teacher Resource Center- Roseville, Minneapolis
- KidSmart - Tools For Learning – St. Louis, Mo.
- LP Pencil Box – Nashville, Tenn.
- North Texas Teacher Resource Center – Dallas, Texas
- Ocean Bank Center for Educational Materials – Miami, Fla.
- Pencils and Paper – Rochester, N.Y.
- Project Teacher – Wichita, Kan.
- Red Apple Supplies – West Palm Beach, Fla.
- Ruth's Reusable Resources – Portland, Maine
- School Tools – A Project of the Food Bank RGV – McAllen, Texas
- Schoolhouse Supplies – Portland, Ore.
- Schools Tools Inland Empire United Way – Rancho Cucamonga, Calif.
- Schools Tools- SE Texas Food Bank – Beaumont, Texas
- Supply Zone for Teachers – Brevard County, Fla.
- Teacher EXCHANGE – Las Vegas, Nev.
- Teacher Resource Center – Appalachia, W.V.
- Teacher Resource Center – Bronx, N.Y.
- Teacher Resource Center – Fife, Wash.
- Teacher Resource Center Chicago – Chicago, Ill.
- Teacher Resource Center Hartford – Hartford, Conn.
- Teacher Resource Center of the North Bay – Napa, Calif.
- Teachers Aid – Houston Food Bank – Houston, Texas
- Teacher's Harvest – Valdosta, Ga.
- Teachers' Supply Closet – Charleston, S.C.
- Teachers' Treasures – Indianapolis, Ind.
- Teaching Tools Resource Center – Tampa, Fla.
- The CORE Store - Plano, Texas
- The Education Partnership – Pittsburgh, Pa
- The Pencil Box – Tulsa, Okla.
- The Teacher's Desk – Buffalo, N.Y.
- Tools 4 Teaching – Ocala, Fla.
- Tools for Schools Broward – Fort Lauderdale, Fla.
- Tools for Schools St. Lucie – Fort Pierce, Fla.
- Treasures 4 Teachers – Phoenix, Ariz.
