= Shyp =

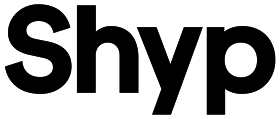
- Type: Private
- Industry: Technology, Internet
- Founded: (2013; 13 years ago) in San Francisco, California
- Founders: Kevin Gibbon; Joshua Scott; Jack Smith
- Defunct: March 27, 2018
- Fate: Dissolved on March 27, 2018
- Headquarters: San Francisco, California
- Key people: Kevin Gibbon (CEO)
- Website: (Shut Down) shyp.com

Shyp was an American shipping company that operated in the years 2013–2018. The company picked up, packaged, and shipped items through USPS and other major carriers.

== History ==
The company was founded in San Francisco by Kevin Gibbon, Joshua Scott and Jack Smith. Until 2017, the company operated in New York, Miami, Los Angeles, Chicago, and Philadelphia.

The company raised a total of $62.1 million in venture-capital funding, with the Series B investment led by investor Kleiner Perkins.

In 2015, the company launched an Android app to complement its iOS app. Also in that year, Shyp added "Shyp Returns" functionality to its apps whereby shoppers could return items they purchased online from select merchants, including Amazon, Target, and Nordstrom.

Shyp was one of the few on-demand companies made up entirely of employees, not independent contractors. In 2015, the company converted its couriers from independent contractors to full-fledged employees.

In 2017, in an effort to become profitable, Shyp laid off the majority of its staff and ceased operating in New York, Los Angeles, and Chicago. In 2018, Shyp CEO Kevin Gibbon announced that the company would shut down and lay off all its employees.
