= Opinion journalism =

Type of journalism

Opinion journalism is a genre of journalism in which the journalist gives their own commentary, analysis or interpretation of an issue or attempts to persuade the reader of a certain viewpoint. The opinions expressed may be, depending on the type of opinion journalism, either the journalist's personal views or the stance of the publication for which they are writing. The most common types of opinion journalism are editorials, op-eds, columns and news analyses.

Opinion became common in journalism in the late 1400s with the advent of the printing press and the end of feudalism. Fact was inseparable from opinion in journalism until the 19th century, after the telegraph was invented and newspapers began to hire long-distance reporters; in the United States, objectivity turned into a standard, so opinion pieces started being placed in a designated section to distinguish them from fact-based news. Countries outside of the United States continued to incorporate commentary and opinion into their reportage. After television became the primary means of reportage in the mid-twentieth century, American news gradually returned to being opinionated. Online journalism appeared after the internet was invented in the 1990s.

== Characteristics ==
=== Definition ===
Opinion journalism encompasses any form of journalism in which the journalist states their (or the publication's) view on an issue (often political), attempts to persuade the reader to adopt a certain point of view, provides commentary on an event, analyses a situation or satirises public figures. Any article of opinion journalism is called an opinion piece.

=== Distinction from news ===
Opinion journalism differs stylistically from informational journalism in that it might come from the first person, contain loaded language, contain personal perspectives like anecdotes or use rhetoric to advance a point.

In newspapers, opinion pieces are located in a dedicated section, which is typically headed with "analysis", "review", "opinion" or "editorial", to distinguish the articles in the section from informational news. On websites, opinion pieces might be distinguished in a variety of ways, or not at all. Some online news outlets put the word "opinion" next to their opinion pieces' headlines.

Opinion journalism and informational journalism have been conflated both in the 21st century and throughout journalism's history; opinion journalism usually contains factual information and informational journalism often contains the journalist's opinions and commentary.

=== Functions ===
Opinion journalism has multiple functions. A commonly stated one is to act as a "point of view" for the audience; that is to say, an opinion writer's commentary and analysis provides a variety of perspectives on a subject so that one can counter preexisting beliefs, consider every possible viewpoint and decide what one's own opinion should be. The commentary in opinion journalism also informs readers of the reasons for, the contexts behind and the connections between problems, events or situations. By giving people arguments that they can use to debate the answers to difficult questions, opinion journalists' work increases discourse between members of the public on the issues they cover. Many opinion journalists try, like news journalists, to hold public officials accountable and advocate for the public's best interests through their journalism.

== Types ==
There are four common types of opinion journalism: editorials, op-eds, columns and news analyses.

Editorial
An editorial attempts to advance a specific point of view or incite its reader to do something. Editorials represent the viewpoints of an entire publication or editorial board, not only its author's; thus it may be authored by multiple people or published anonymously, in which case it is an "unsigned editorial". Editorials might include statistics and objective information gained from the publication's ordinary news coverage in order to strengthen their arguments. Editorials in newspapers are on the left side of the last page.

Op-ed
An op-ed (short for "opposite of the editorial page") is similar to an editorial but not usually written by someone affiliated with the publication. Instead, its author will typically be a guest writer like a politician, an academic or an intellectual. Op-eds express their individual authors' opinions and are located on the page opposite the editorial page.

Column
A column expresses the opinions of its author, who usually works for the publication, and does not always argue for a specific point. Columns are definitionally broader than editorials and encompass any non-fact-based article that is neither an editorial nor an op-ed. They may include personal anecdotes, whereas editorials and op-eds generally cannot. A column may engage in polemics, analyse an issue, give advice to the reader or mock a public figure. A series of columns written by the same author may feature regularly, such as on a weekly basis, in the publication. Columns in newspapers are on the reverse side of the first page.

News analysis
A news analysis, which is usually authored by a regular journalist and not an editorialist, includes the journalist's analysis, commentary and predictions of an event. In an analysis a journalist may relate a contemporary event to similar happenings throughout history or explain how events lead to one another or are connected.

== History ==
In Europe in the late 1400s, the feudal system collapsed and the recently invented printing press became ubiquitous. Hitherto, journalists would note only what they observed, leaving out any interpretations or commentary, and submit their handwritten reports to their readership (usually members of the wealthy elite). Feudalism's replacement with capitalism and the printing press's ability to quickly produce documents (pamphlets, books and news sheets) turned writing into a commodity. Journalists began to incorporate their own opinions and personalities into their writing in order to draw readers. British journalist Bob Franklin considered Michel de Montaigne, who wrote commentary on events of his time (the 16th century) in his essays, to have created the prototype of a newspaper column.

Opinion journalism was, for most of its history from thereon, not separated from factual journalism. It was routine for journalists to include commentary and push their beliefs in their news coverage. For example The Pennsylvania Gazette, which Benjamin Franklin operated between 1729 and 1748, regularly published Franklin's opinions and observations. Newspapers, many of which were funded by political entities or made specifically to propagate their publishers' ideologies, could be extremely biased and composed of very little fact relative to opinion. The Journal of Occurrences, which from 1768 to 1769 was published throughout the American colonies by patriots from Boston in protest of the British Crown, was the first syndicated column in what is now the United States.

In the 19th century the development of the telegraph and the new practice of employing full-time reporters made gathering information easier and led to journalism being treated, in the United States, purely as a means of spreading information. Newspapers were now less dependent on opinion to fill their pages, so newspaper publishers and journalists abandoned their partisanship and increased the objectivity of their reportage. By the late 19th century American newspapers kept opinion pieces in a separate section from their normal journalism.

By the 1920s the Progressive movement, which pushed for better journalistic practices, had turned objectivity into a standard in American journalism; subjectivity was relegated to columns and editorials. Columns were often syndicated, meaning that one column would be run in many newspapers throughout the country; this supplied local newspapers that could not afford to hire their own columnists. Journalists' opinions remained an expected part of news in Latin America and the United Kingdom, so newspapers there did not decrease in partisanship and opinionation as those in the United States did. Magazines both in the United States and abroad have, unlike newspapers, never adopted objectivity as a standard. In the early 20th century in Spain, Eugeni d'Ors invented a type of column, a glosa, that consisted of several brief aphorisms, the last of which would often reveal the column's political point. Around the same time other Spanish journalists developed ensayimo, another form of opinion journalism, that read like an essay.

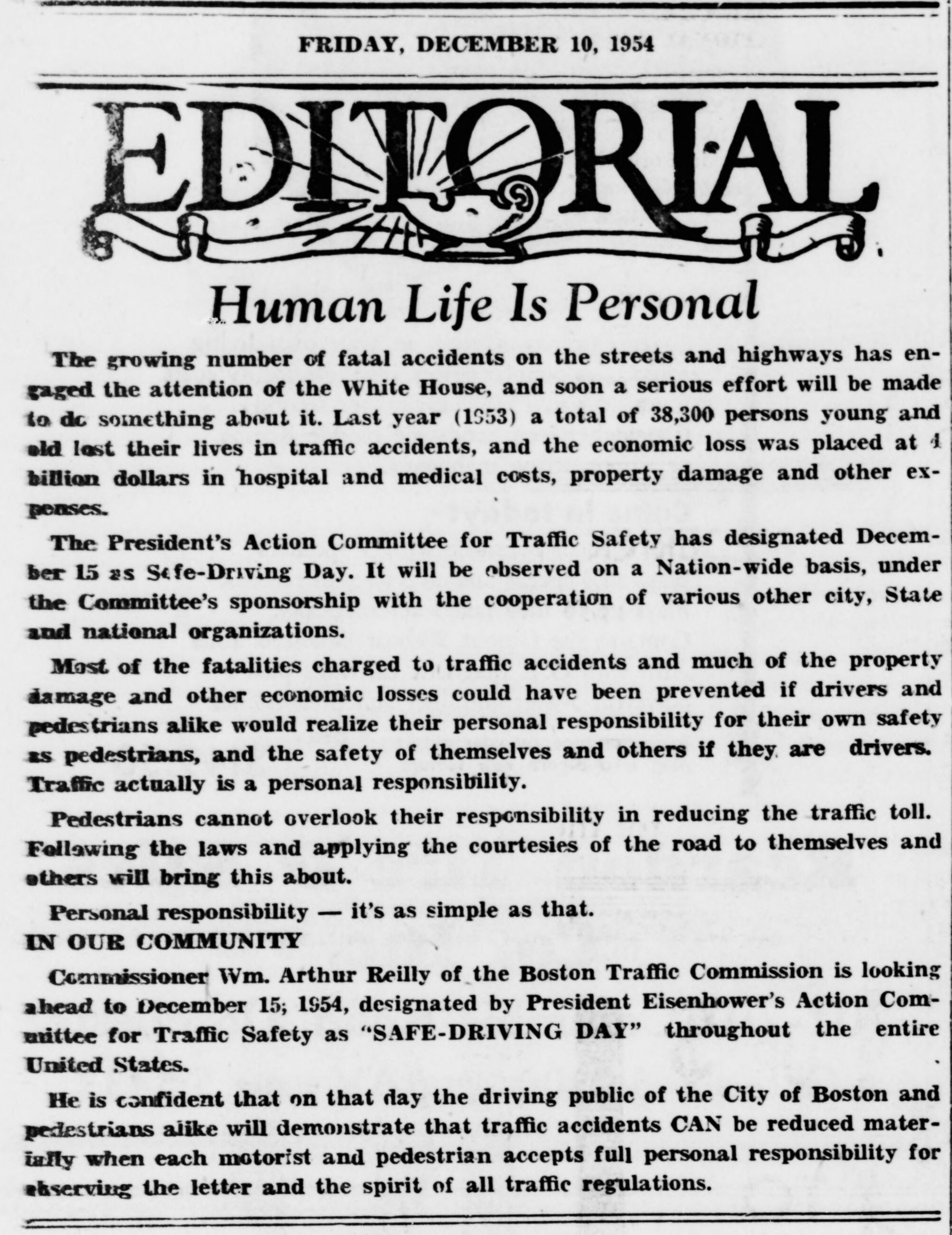
Opinion pieces, such as this editorial from 1954, appear in a dedicated section.

The first radio broadcasts to the public were made in the 1910s. By the 1920s journalists were using the medium to broadcast their commentary on contemporary events, as well as regular news. Debates were aired on the radio, too, such as those between Clarence Darrow and William Jennings Bryan in 1925 during the Scopes trial. Television replaced radio by the 1950s as the primary medium through which news was transmitted. Televised news started off as straightforward and dependent on audio, but as its visual component improved through the 1960s it developed an opinionated style of reportage. News programs now featured editorial segments where hosts voiced their opinions. Two notable such hosts were Walter Cronkite and Edward R. Murrow, American journalists who in their segments condemned the Vietnam War and McCarthyism respectively.

In the United States during the 1960s, writers who disapproved of the Vietnam War became disillusioned with the notion of objectivity. New Journalism and gonzo journalism came into existence as a result. Both of these styles disregarded objectivity, applied literary techniques to nonfiction and centred their authors' subjective experiences. Among these styles' purveyors were Tom Wolfe, Joan Didion, Gay Talese and Hunter S. Thompson. The term "New Journalism" was applied, retrospectively in the 1970s, to a similar movement in journalism in Japan that also occurred in the 1960s; Japanese contributors to New Journalism included Takashi Tachibana, Sawaki Kōtarō, Ryūzō Saki and Uwamae Junichirō.

From the 1940s to the 1990s political commentary and speculative pieces started to comprise an increasingly large portion of election coverage in newspapers in the United States, Sweden, Germany, Belgium and the Netherlands. In 1970 The New York Times, believing that readers would like to read more opinion articles, began including an op-ed section opposite the page the editorials were situated on; this op-ed section became the basis for the modern form of newspaper opinion sections in the United States.

In the 1970s, after the end of Francisco Franco's regime following his death in 1975, columnists, many of whom were also novelists, developed a style of writing, periodismo informativo de creación, that applied the narrative devices of literary fiction to the real-life basis of opinion journalism. Among the columnists who created this style were Francisco Umbral, Rosa Montero, Manuel Vázquez Montalbán and Maruja Torres.

Televised opinion journalism was popularised in Japan in the 1980s by the station TV Asahi. Kume Hiroshi, who hosted the station's news programme, played a character called a "caster" who made acerbic commentary in mockery of the Liberal Democratic Party. Through the 1990s and 2000s, cable television news programs in the United States became more conversational, abstract and argumentative, since this informal style of journalism attracted specific audiences; broadcast television, contrariwise, targeted a more general audience than cable and thus kept a factual manner of reporting.

The advent of the internet in the late 1990s and the 2000s gave journalists more means and more leeway to express their ideas; online journalism was more opinionated and personal, even in its regular coverage, than its print predecessor. The informational sections of American print newspapers have remained objective relative to those of digital and televised journalism. Social media appeared in the 2000s and 2010s and has become one of the most widespread methods of communication. Because information can be disseminated instantaneously through social media, the news cycle has shortened. Some opinion writers share their pieces on social media sites like Substack. Many news outlets have, in a bid to keep up with their readers' interests, stopped running syndicated columns and replaced them with local columnists.

== Ethics ==
The Society of Professional Journalists (SPJ) Code of Ethics does not have provisions specifically for opinion journalists but urges journalists of all genres to represent facts accurately in their commentary, avoid conflicts of interests, reject favours and clearly mark non-news reporting as such. News outlets generally hold their opinion writers up to the same ethical standards to which they hold up their regular journalists. Opinion journalists can be, and have been, fired for espousing opinions that their employers deem politically incorrect, extremist, insensitive or harmful to their organisations' reputations.

Journalistic organisations generally support opinion journalism as long as it is clearly identified as such (e.g. by the presence of the word "opinion" right next to the headline) to prevent readers from confusing it with fact-based journalism.

== Research ==
=== Political ===
The Pew Research Center reported in 2018 that, when shown five statements of fact and five statements of opinion from the news, 26% of a sample of 5,035 American adults correctly classified all the factual statements and 35% correctly classified all the opinion statements; people with high political awareness, technological proficiency and interest and trust in the news were all somewhat more likely to identify every statement accurately. If someone misidentified an opinion as factual he was likelier to believe it to be true; conversely if he misidentified a fact as opinion he was likelier to believe it to be false. People who associated themselves with either the Democratic or Republican parties were likelier to misidentify a statement as factual if it appealed to their political views.

In 2021 three academics from the Missouri School of Journalism used Factiva's database to gather 155 editorials, 8 op-eds and 172 columns, all of which discussed hate speech, from 48 American newspapers. They reported that many of the opinion journalists stated or insinuated that hate speech (defined by the authors as "speech that attacks or attempts to subordinate any group of people based on social characteristics such as gender, race, sexual orientation, or disability") was a natural product of the freedom of speech and the press, that unreasonable accusations of hate speech were being employed by one party (often the Democratic Party) to vilify the other (often the Republican Party) and that hate speech was a necessary part of discourse.

=== Demographics of American opinion journalists ===
A survey in 2017 about the demographic and occupational statistics of 133 American opinion journalists, of whom 117 were included in the final report, found that most (63.2%) had prior experience in a journalism organisation and that the average opinion journalist had, at the time of the survey, been an opinion writer for 10–14 years. Most had more than 25 years of experience in journalism in general. 29.9% supported the Democratic Party and 8.5% supported the Republican Party. 36.1% were politically independent, and the rest of the sample supported some other party.

As was the case for journalists in general most opinion journalists were male (71%) and white (88.9%). 4.3% were black, 3.4% were Hispanic and 3.4% belonged to another race. 93.9% of opinion journalists had attained some form of college education: 6.8% had a doctorate, 35% had a graduate degree and 52.1% had a four-year degree. Compared to other types of journalists opinion journalists were older on average, 75.2% being between the ages of 45 and 74.

== Criticism ==
People have criticised opinion journalism for decreasing the public’s trust in the media. According to David Andreatta, a media relations specialist for the University of Rochester, the public expects news sources to be factual and reliable, so when informational news has elements of opinion or opinion pieces are not labelled as such, people become uncertain what is fact and what is opinion; as a result they lose trust in the news.

In 2018 Jennifer Kavanagh and Michael D. Rich of the RAND Corporation published a report, Truth Decay, in which they blamed the increasing prominence of opinion journalism for the shrinking role of facts (which they dubbed "truth decay") in American discourse, a perceived deterioration of civil discussion and a growing distrust of mass media.

In 2024 The Economist published an article, "The Muted Megaphone", that argued that the increased presence of opinion in journalism was leaving the public ill-informed and overtaking fact-based journalism in prevalence. Opinion pieces, according to the article, attract more attention the more extreme the views they express are. When politically moderate, and often more accurate and informative, media receives less attention than extreme media, fact-based journalism becomes more difficult for the average person to find.

In 2020, Eliana Miller of the Poynter Institute stated that the layouts of many news websites, unlike newspapers, do not mark opinion pieces as such; as a result readers must use language cues (like use of the first person, promotional language and advocacy for a certain viewpoint) and differences in web page design to determine whether an article is an opinion or a part of regular coverage.

Parker Molloy of Dame Magazine claimed in a 2022 article that news outlets' tendency to present opinion pieces similarly to factual coverage causes conspiracy theories and falsehoods espoused by the pieces' authors to be disseminated as if they were true, especially when the news outlets are otherwise considered trustworthy; for example, in 2020 Newsweek published an opinion piece in which John Eastman falsely claimed that Kamala Harris would be ineligible for vice president since her parents were not US citizens when she was born. Because of Newsweek's reputation several right-wing news outlets reported the misinformation as fact.

== See also ==
- Interpretive journalism
- Narrative journalism
- Advocacy journalism

== Works cited ==
- Franklin, Bob (2008). Pulling newspapers apart: analysing print journalism. London: Routledge. ISBN 978-0-203-63070-9.
- Zamith, Rodrigo (22 August 2022). "The American Journalism Handbook - Concepts, Issues, and Skills (Zamith)". Social Sci LibreTexts.
- Seguín, Bécquer (2024). The op-ed novel: a literary history of post-Franco Spain (First printing ed.). Cambridge, Massachusetts London, England: Harvard University Press. ISBN 978-0-674-29481-3.
- Franklin, Bob; Hamer, Martin; Hanna, Mark; Kinsey, Marie; Richardson, John E. (2005). Key Concepts in Journalism Studies. SAGE Publications. ISBN 9781847877611.
- Woolsey, Jeremy (2025), Process as Truth: On the Career of Tahara Sōichirō and a Culture of Mass Media Critique in 1970s–2000s Japan, ProQuest 3216807182 – via ProQuest
- Hinkle, Olin; Henry, John (1952). "How to Write Columns". www.iastatedigitalpress.com. Iowa State College Press. doi:10.31274/isudp.1952.36.
- Bittner, John R. (1977). Radio journalism. Englewood Cliffs, N.J. : Prentice-Hall. ISBN 978-0-13-750463-3.
