= Questione Ladina =

Debate on the unity of Rhaeto-Romance languages

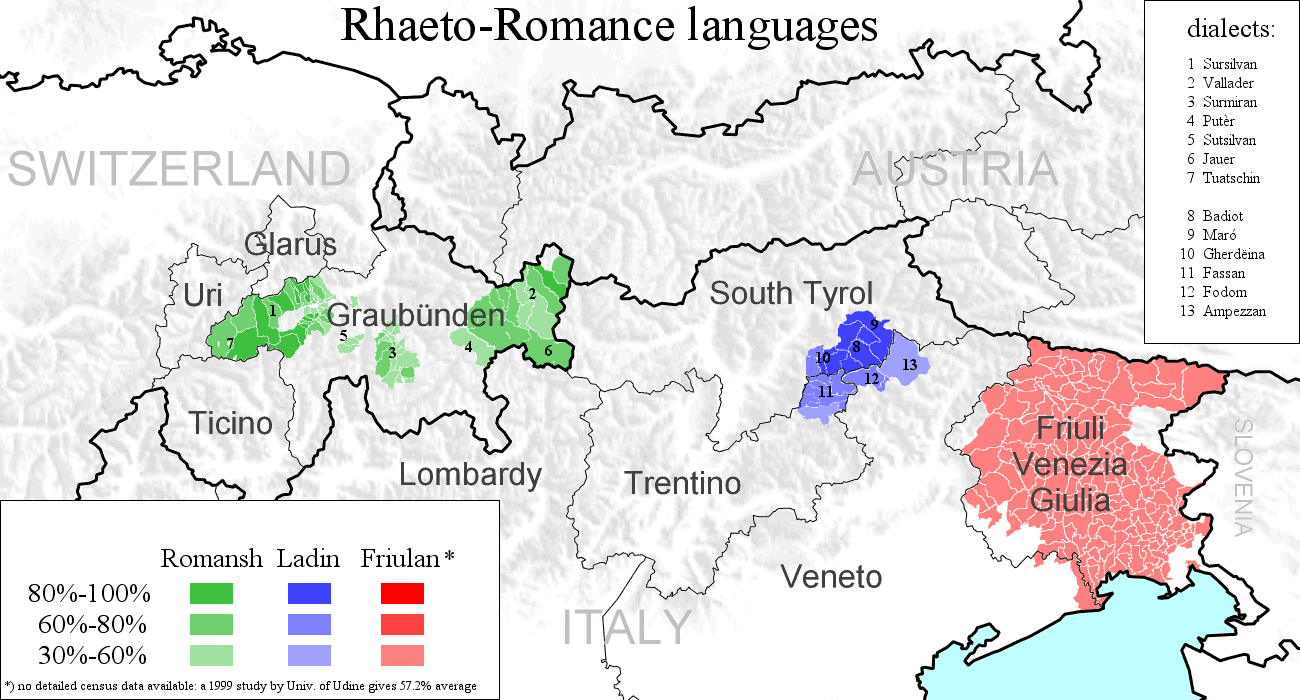
The Rhaeto-Romance languages

The Questione Ladina ('Ladin Question') is a controversy over whether the Romance languages of Romansh, Ladin, and Friulian form a proper language subfamily or should rather be regarded as a part of a wider Northern Italian dialect continuum. Both the idea of a distinctive language sub-family and the denial of a Ladin unity still have strong proponents, the former especially among Swiss, German and Austrian, the latter among Italian linguists. The issue has political implications beyond the linguistic controversy, as the areas involved have been subjects of territorial disputes, especially during the first half of the 20th century.

== Position of the Ascolians ==
The beginning of the Questione Ladina is marked in 1873 by the publication of the Saggi ladini by Graziadio Isaia Ascoli (1829–1907), who identified the area between the Oberalp Pass and the Gulf of Trieste as a specific language area, with some common characteristics, and called the idioms spoken there Ladin dialects (unità ladina).

The theory gained a large circulation with the publications of the Austrian linguist Theodor Gartner, who, however, used Rhaeto-Romance instead of Ladin as an umbrella term.

Both postulated that there are a lot of common features between Romansh, Ladin – also encompassing the dialects of the Non Valley (German: Nonsbergtal) and Val di Sole (German: Sulzbergtal) – and Friulian. This led them to the conclusion that a common ancestor of those languages used to be spoken in the area. Due to settlers and linguistic pressure from both German and Italian, the unity of the languages was disrupted, resulting in the development of several distinct languages.

== Position of the Battistians or Italianists ==
The idea of a Ladin unity was strongly opposed by Carlo Battisti (1882–1977), who tried to demonstrate, in several studies, that the whole range of dialects in question showed only a few common characteristics and was just as closely related to neighboring Lombard and Venetian varieties. The dialectologist Carlo Salvioni held similar views.

They conclude that those "common features" are in fact features of a former Northern Italian dialect, which survived only in more isolated areas in the mountains.

== Other positions ==
A third position has been taken by other linguists (e.g. Heinrich Schmid, Andreas Schorta, Pierre Bec, and Geoffrey Hull), who agree with the Italianists that the Rhaeto-Romance languages are archaic variants of the adjacent vernaculars of Lombardy, Trentino and Venetia, but differ from them in considering the entire Rhaeto-Cisalpine or Padanian linguistic unity to be an integral unit of Gallo-Romance and structurally not Italo-Romance, in spite of superficial Italian influences in certain areas (Liguria, Veneto, and Istria primarily, but also in Friuli and parts of Lombardy).

== Aspects ==
A characteristic is the commixture of grammatical and sociolinguistic aspects, as well as of linguistic and political-ideological convictions. Battisti and Salvioni's research was influenced by sympathies for the Italian irredentism, leading to the demand that speakers of Romansh should accept Italian as a Dachsprache because of their "Italianity", and subsequently to linguistically justified political claims that the Romansh-speaking Graubünden should become part of Italy. On the other hand, Swiss linguists regarded mere grammatical features as subordinated to sociolinguistic and historic considerations, and they strongly supported the idea of a separate language.

== Modern discussion ==
It is still debated whether or not to include the dialects of the Non Valley and the Valle di Sole within Rhaeto-Romance. The question gained prominence after the census of 2001, in which many speakers of those dialects self-identified as Ladins.
