= Narrative journalism =

Form of creative nonfiction

Narrative journalism, or literary journalism, is a form of creative nonfiction in which the author applies the literary devices and stylistic features of fiction to a news story.

== Characteristics ==
Narrative journalism uses storytelling techniques to present information about current events and is composed of three aspects: setting (the context behind the story), complication (the main events of the story) and outcome (the story's aftermath). Whereas regular news reports follow the inverted pyramid format, narrative journalists generally present their pieces in chronological order or divide them into episodes. News stories that do not take the narrative format are called "hard news" stories.

A narrative journalist may employ literary devices like suspense, flashbacks and flashforwards to engage his audience, and the piece may be written as if the events covered were parts of a plot and the people involved were characters. Many narrative journalists write in first-person, thereby including themselves as characters, to create the appearance of a connection between themselves and their stories. There may be a moral in a work of narrative journalism.

Narrative journalism gives more coverage than regular news reporting does to the contexts of and circumstances behind events. Narrative journalists attempt to make their readers understand their sources' motives and actions by incorporating their sources' thoughts into their pieces. British scholar John E. Richardson wrote that narrative journalism "illustrate[s] and propagate[s] social values" and thereby gives readers more ways of "comprehending the events of the world around us".

== Format ==
Narrative journalism has historically appeared in literary form through books, magazines, essays and newspaper articles. It is common in travelogues and in reports on wars and social issues. Written narrative journalism emulates literary fiction's style of prose. Narrative journalism can also be created in other media, such as podcasts and radio broadcasts whose hosts use similar storytelling techniques to written narrative journalism. Podcasting and radio permit narrative journalists to make use of sound effects, and their own voices, to express emotions and ideas that cannot be conveyed as strongly in text. Journalists have also used data visualisations, virtual reality, video games and animations to present news stories.

The advent of the internet in the 1990s and 2000s caused a decline in newspapers' readerships; because newspapers no longer make enough money to sustain lengthy issues, news outlets have decreased the number of pages and features they include in them, so narrative pieces do not appear regularly in newspapers anymore. Narrative journalism's place in magazines has decreased as well. It has become more common since then for narrative journalists to create and publish their work on online news websites and through audiovisual media.

== History ==
The theatre and mythology of Ancient Greece included dramatic retellings of supposedly real events and are the most likely progenitors of narrative journalism. Narrative journalists apply the same concepts and devices to their stories that Ancient Greek dramatists did to their plays; narrative journalism generally contains "complete" storylines with beginnings, middles and ends, and includes incidents that cause major events later on in the story. The flashbacks and flashforwards used in narrative journalism are similar to the altered chronology used by Homer in his epic poems and Sophocles in Oedipus the King.

Characteristics of narrative journalism could be found in Daniel Defoe's writings of the 18th century and in the realist novels of the 19th century. In the mid-18th century, English writer Samuel Johnson and Scottish writer James Boswell attempted to write nonfictional accounts of their lives that they referred to as "novels". Journalism in 18th- and 19th-century Germany was indistinguishable from literature as most German journalists then, like Heinrich Heine and Heinrich von Kleist, were writers who happened to develop interests in journalism. Narrative journalism began in Australia with the appearance of English settlers, who had brought with them the printing press, in 1788. Explorers and military officers, the most popular of them being Watkin Tench, wrote literary accounts, in the forms of books and letters, of their exploits within Australia and around the world. These accounts, which contained suspense and dialogue, were usually commissioned by, and written for, publishers and readers living in Britain who were curious about what their authors experienced in Australia. Journalism itself only became established in Australia decades later in the 1820s. Norwegian travel writers in the 19th century embellished their reportage with fictional elements.

Starting in the 1830s, Australian journals such as Hill's Life, The Satirist, Australian Magazine and The Currency Lad published short stories and articles on various topics including humour, satire, crime and human interest. Attempts to write nonfictional accounts in the manner of novels were made in the United States as early as the former half of the 19th century, with Augustus Baldwin Longstreet's 1835 book Georgia Scenes and Henry David Thoreau's Cape Cod, the latter of which was serialised in 1855 in Putnam's Monthly Magazine and published in print in 1865. Narrative journalism became an established form in the US, in and of itself, in the latter half of the century, after the American Civil War ended and realism turned into the dominant literary movement. Folklorist and anthropologist Lafcadio Hearn's 1876 article "Levee Life" was an example of literary realism applied to journalism. Stephen Crane's accounts of New York City in the 1890s were filled with "a host of literary techniques, including contrast, dialogue, concrete description, detailed scene setting, careful word selection ... and irony". Also in the 1890s, the Bulletin, based in Sydney, featured, as well as poetry, short stories and political satire, the literary pieces of Banjo Paterson and Henry Lawson.

The dispatches that engineer and writer Euclides da Cunha published in the newspaper O Estado de S. Paulo during the War of Canudos in the 1890s were the first instances of literary journalism in Brazil. The crônica (different from crónica) was a genre of social commentary, popular during the same time, that had characteristics of literature and journalism but was not organised chronologically; this genre died out in the early 1900s. From the 1900s to the publication of his last book in 1919, João do Rio wrote many narratives covering the lives of Rio de Janeiro's residents; he relied on his own observations and his interviews with subjects for information, but wrote in a novel-like style. Although Rio's books sold well, literary journalism did not regain popularity in Brazil until the 1940s and 1950s.

Muckrakers including Upton Sinclair, Lincoln Steffens and Ida Tarbell in the early 1900s during the Progressive era wrote their investigations of social issues, like political corruption and unethical business practices, in the form of narratives; McClure's Magazine was the most prominent publisher of these pieces. Jack London's investigative reporting on poverty in The People of the Abyss (1903) is often seen as an early example of modern narrative journalism, as London disguised himself as a tramp in order to participate in his own narrative. Early-20th-century modernist writers throughout Latin America created a style of narrative journalism called crónica.

In Germany after World War I, the Weimar Republic constitutionally granted its citizens freedom of opinion but by 1921 penalised "subversive" news outlets; a literary, indirect style of reporting was less likely than hard news to face censorship and thus became ubiquitous in newspapers and literature during the 1920s. Egon Erwin Kisch, one of the most prominent narrative journalists in Germany, had been publishing pieces of narrative journalism (or literary reportage) since the 1900s. In China, a genre of narrative journalism called baogao wenxue, meaning "reportage literature", appeared in the 1930s; it discussed social problems and used ordinary people as its subjects. Baogao wenxue was influenced by the literary journalism of Kisch, who had visited China in the 1930s to promote his literary reportage and write a book titled Secret China.

Literary journalism, as with every other genre of journalism, disappeared in Germany during the 1930s and 1940s, when the Nazi Party eliminated independent journalism and persecuted political dissidents, causing many journalists and intellectuals to emigrate. Narrative journalism fell out of favour with most American publications, with an exception of The New Yorker, when objectivity became a standard in American journalism in the 1920s and 1930s and journalists started using the inverted pyramid structure to write their stories. After World War II ended in 1945 with the defeat of Nazi Germany, the Allied forces took over the German news industry; presuming that subjectivity in German journalism had propagandised the public, they required Germany to adopt a wholly fact based system of reporting. Literary journalism did not return to German media until the 1960s. In the US, contrariwise, journalists who wanted to involve themselves more closely with their subjects and give their readers more intimate depictions of them recommenced to experiment with narrative in their work.

Argentinian crime fiction writer Rodolfo Walsh's 1957 book Operación Masacre, which exposed an attempted massacre of twelve men (six of whom survived) by police in the province of Buenos Aires, might have been the first non-fiction novel, or novel-length work of narrative journalism. Writers in the 1960s, including Truman Capote, Joan Didion, Hunter S. Thompson, Gay Talese and Tom Wolfe, who wanted to appeal to the counterculture and other societal changes of that decade questioned the importance of complete objectivity in journalism; New Journalism and Gonzo journalism came into existence as a result. Both of these genres centred their authors' thoughts and experiences and presented real stories in the style of literary fiction. Capote's In Cold Blood, in which Capote recounted the murders of four members of a Kansas family, was published in 1966; Capote asserted that In Cold Blood was the progenitor of the nonfiction novel. Analagous movements to the American New Journalism appeared in Japan and Australia during the same time. Contributors to Japanese New Journalism included Tachibana Takashi, Sawaki Kōtarō, Ryūzō Saki and Uwamae Junichirō.

In 1969 the Washington Post, wanting to attract the then-adolescent baby boomers to its newspaper, replaced its women's section with a Style section, which contained longer, more interpretive and more opinionated pieces than its regular news and revived narrative's place in mainstream American journalism. In the 1970s, after the end of Francisco Franco's regime following his death in 1975, Spanish columnists, many of whom were also novelists, developed a style of writing, periodismo informativo de creación, that combined the literary style of narrative journalism with the commentarial basis of opinion journalism. Among the columnists who created this style were Francisco Umbral, Rosa Montero, Manuel Vázquez Montalbán and Maruja Torres.

== See also ==
- Interpretive journalism
- True crime
- Roman à clef
- Long-form journalism

== Works cited ==
- Wielechowski, Benjamin (2021). Introduction to Narrative Journalism. University of Michigan-Dearborn.
- Schmidt, Thomas R. (2017). Rediscovering narrative: A cultural history of journalistic storytelling in american newspapers, 1969-2001 (Ph.D. thesis). University of Oregon. ProQuest 1947043213.
- Franklin, Bob; Hamer, Martin; Hanna, Mark; Kinsey, Marie; Richardson, John E. (2005). Key Concepts in Journalism Studies. SAGE Publications. ISBN 9781847877611.
- Woolsey, Jeremy (2025), Process as Truth: On the Career of Tahara Sōichirō and a Culture of Mass Media Critique in 1970s–2000s Japan, ProQuest 3216807182 – via ProQuest
- Seguín, Bécquer (2024). The op-ed novel: a literary history of post-Franco Spain (First printing ed.). Cambridge, Massachusetts London, England: Harvard University Press. ISBN 978-0-674-29481-3.
- Chávez Díaz, Liliana (2022). Latin American documentary narratives: the intersections of storytelling and journalism in contemporary literature. New York: Bloomsbury Academic. ISBN 978-1-5013-6601-7.
- Hartsock, John C. (2000). A history of American literary journalism: the emergence of a modern narrative form. Amherst: University of Massachusetts. ISBN 978-1-55849-251-6.
- Bak, John S.; Reynolds, Bill, eds. (2011). Literary journalism across the globe: journalistic traditions and transnational influences. Amherst: University of Massachusetts Press. ISBN 978-1-55849-877-8.
- McDonald, Willa (2023). Literary Journalism in Colonial Australia. Palgrave Studies in Literary Journalism Series (1st ed.). Cham: Springer International Publishing AG. ISBN 978-3-031-31788-0.
