= ET3 =

ET3 or ET-3 may refer to:

- Electronics Technician (US Navy), Third Class, United States Naval rating
- ET3 (Greece), 3rd channel from Ellinikí Radiofonía Tileórasi (ERT), the Hellenic Broadcasting Corporation
- Earl Thomas (defensive back), an American football free safety for the Seattle Seahawks
- Vespa ET-3, model produced between the 1970s and the mid-1990s
- Evacuated Tube Transport Technologies, a business committed to the implementation of Evacuated Tube Transport (ETT)
- Endothelin 3, a protein, member of endothelin family
