= James Everett Lipp =

American aerospace engineer (1910–1993)

- Born: 3 July 1910; Washington, D.C., US
- Died: 13 August 1993 (aged 83); San Diego, California, US
- Scientific career
- Fields: Aerospace engineering
- Thesis: Strength of Thin Walled Cylinders Subjected to Combined Compression and Torsion (1935)
- Doctoral advisor: Theodore von Kármán

James Everett Lipp (July 3, 1910 – August 13, 1993) was an American aerospace engineer. He attended California Institute of Technology (MS, 1934; PhD, 1935) and began his career at the Douglas Aircraft Company, staying there until 1948. He then joined the missile division at the newly created Project RAND as one of the first four full-time employees, tasked by then Brigadier General Curtis LeMay to figure out how to launch orbiting satellites from a spaceship. Lipp would later become the head of the aerospace division at RAND and subsequently, corporate director of development planning at Lockheed Corporation. His recommendations to the Air Force in February 1947 helped contribute to the creation of the US civil and military satellite program during the Cold War.

== Selected work ==
- Lipp, J. E., R. M. Salter Jr., and R. S. Wehner, et.al. (April 1951). "The Utility of a Satellite Vehicle for Reconnaissance". The Rand Corporation. R -217. pp. ix, 1-21, 28-39.
- Lipp, J. E. & R. M. Salter (March 1954). "Project Feed Back Summary Report". The RAND Corporation. R -262, Volume II. pp. 109-10, Rand Library.

== See also ==
- "Preliminary Design of an Experimental World-Circling Spaceship" (1946)

== Bibliography ==
- Abella, Alex (2009). Soldiers of Reason: The Rand Corporation and the Rise of the American Empire. Houghton Mifflin Harcourt. ISBN 9780156033442.
- Davies, Merton E.; Harris, William Robert (1988) Rand's Role in the Evolution of Balloon and Satellite Observation Systems and Related U.S. Space Technology. Rand Corporation.
- Logsdon, John M. (1995). Exploring the Unknown: Selected Documents in the History of the U.S. Civil Space Program. Vol. 1. The NASA History Series. NASA SP-4407.
- Taubman, Phillip (2003). Secret Empire: Eisenhower, the CIA, and the Hidden Story of America’s Space Espionage. Simon & Schuster. ISBN 0684856999.
- U.S. Congress. House Committee on Science and Astronautics. (April 29, 1960) . "Biography of Dr. James E. Lipp, Corporate Director of Development Planning, Lockheed Aircraft Corp.". Frontiers in Oceanic Research (H.R. 6298). To amend the National Aeronautics and Space Act of 1958. 86th Congress. Second Session on H.R. 9675. No. 5. Hearings 1960. Volume 2. U.S. Government Printing Office. pp. 67-68.
- Wade, Mark (2019). "Lipp, James Everett". Encyclopedia Astronautica. Retrieved August 7, 2023.
