= ET3 Global Alliance =

American transportation consortium

ET3 Global Alliance Inc.
- Company type: Consortium
- Industry: Public transport
- Founder: Daryl Oster
- Headquarters: Longmont, Colorado, United States
- Key people: Daryl Oster (CEO)
- Products: Evacuated Tube Transport (ET3)
- Website: et3.com

ET3 Global Alliance is an American open consortium of licensees that has tried to implement the Evacuated Tube Transport (ET3). It was founded by Daryl Oster in 1997.

The stated goal of the consortium was to build a global transportation system using car-sized capsules traveling in 1.5-meter-diameter tubes via frictionless superconductive maglev. Oster claims that the ET3 system will cost only 20 cents' worth of electrical energy to get up to 350 mph (560 km/h). ET3 claims that initial systems would travel at the speed of 600 km/h (370 mph) for in-state trips and later will be developed to 6,500 km/h (4,000 mph, hypersonic speed).

== History ==
Southwest Jiaotong University (SWJTU) became the first university institution to become licensees of the ET3 GA consortium. Most ET3 licensees held outside of the United States are held in China. By 2007, Yaoping Zhang, a former professor of SWJTU, began promoting ETT as "evolutionary transportation". Yaoping Zhang currently operates ET3 GA's subsidiary ET3 China Inc.

ET3 has filed a series of new patents in 2014 relating to the field of high-temperature superconductivity (HTS). As of 2016, more than 380 licenses have been sold in 22 countries, including China, where ET3 claims that more than a dozen licenses have been sold. Daryl Oster and his team met with Elon Musk in late July 2013 to discuss the technology, resulting in Musk promising an investment in a 3 mi (4.8 km) prototype of ET3's design.

== See also ==
- Hyperloop
- Swissmetro, a project started in 1974
- Vactrain, first proposed 1914
