= Michael D. Rich =

American businessman

President Emeritus of RAND Corporation
- In office November 1, 2011 – July 4, 2022
- Preceded by: James Thomson
- Succeeded by: Jason Gaverick Matheny

Personal details
- Born: Los Angeles, California, U.S.
- Education: University of California, Berkeley (BA); University of California, Los Angeles (JD)

Michael D. Rich is President Emeritus at RAND Corporation. Rich was the fifth president and CEO of the Santa Monica, California-based research institution, succeeding James A. Thomson, who had led RAND from 1989 to 2011. Rich was appointed as President and CEO in November 2011 and served in that role until his retirement in 2022. Rich was succeeded by current RAND President and CEO Jason Gaverick Matheny.

Rich is co-author of the 2018 book Truth Decay: An Initial Exploration of the Diminishing Role of Facts and Analysis in American Public Life, along with co-author Jennifer Kavanagh.

== Education ==
Rich attended Los Angeles Public Schools, graduating from William Howard Taft High School in Woodland Hills in 1970. He received his B.A. from the University of California, Berkeley, and his J.D. from the University of California, Los Angeles.

== Career ==
Rich is a native of Los Angeles who joined RAND as a summer associate and then as a member of the institution's research team. He was involved in establishing RAND's research and analysis practice in the Middle East.

Before becoming RAND president and CEO, he was Vice President in charge of RAND's National Security Research Division and Director of the National Defense Research Institute, the federally funded research and development center that provides research and policy analysis to the Office of the Secretary of Defense, the defense agencies, the Joint Chiefs of Staff, and the Department of State.

He led the effort to gain land use entitlements from the city of Santa Monica and the California Coastal Commission to build the RAND headquarters campus, which opened in 2005 and today houses 1,000 RAND associates. The project earned Gold LEED Certification from the U.S. Green Building Council and the Urban Land Institute's award for excellence.

== Family ==
He is the son of the late aviation pioneer Ben Rich, a prominent aeronautical engineer with Lockheed Skunk Works, and his wife Faye Mayer, a fashion model.

Michael Rich is married to Debra Granfield, a retired labor attorney. The couple has two sons, Matthew and William.
