= Brian Michael Jenkins =

American terrorism expert (born 1942)

Brian Michael Jenkins (born 1942) is an American expert on terrorism and transportation security. During his over five decades of analysis, Jenkins has advised governments, private corporations, the Catholic Church, and the Church of England on terrorist threats.

== Biography ==
Jenkins was born in 1942 in Chicago. He joined the United States Army at 19. He served with the 7th Special Forces Group in the Dominican Republic and with the 5th Special Forces Group in Vietnam. He subsequently served as a civilian with the Long Range Planning Task Group advising General Creighton Abrams, commander of military operations in Vietnam.

He was featured in the 1980 documentary about the Vietnam War, Vietnam: The Ten Thousand Day War. From 1989 to 1998, Jenkins was deputy chairman of security firm Kroll Associates. He currently serves as Senior Advisor to the President of the RAND Corporation and Director of the Mineta Transportation Institute's Transportation Security Center. He also served as a member of the White House Commission on Aviation Safety and Security, 1996–1997 and as an advisor to the National Commission on Terrorism, 2000. He has served as an advisor to the U.S. Department of State, the Department of Defense, the Department of Energy, the Nuclear Regulatory Commission, and other government agencies.

Jenkins is the author of many books, including Unconquerable Nation (2006), Will Terrorists Go Nuclear? (2008), and Plagues and their Aftermath (2022).

== Quotes ==
- "Terrorism is theater" (1974)
- "Terrorists want a lot of people watching, not a lot of people dead" (1975)
