= Robert M. Salter =

American engineer

Robert M. Salter Jr. was an American engineer who worked for the RAND Corporation. He was one of the first to study the possibility of using a satellite to collect information. During the 1970s, he advocated the vactrain high-speed transit concept. He also published papers on energy storage for the space program.

Salter died in May 2011.

== See also ==
- Preliminary Design of an Experimental World-Circling Spaceship
