= Unconquerable Nation =

Book by Brian Michael Jenkins

Unconquerable Nation: Knowing Our Enemy, Strengthening Ourselves
- Author: Brian Michael Jenkins
- Publication date: August 22, 2006
- ISBN: 0-8330-3893-1

Unconquerable Nation: Knowing Our Enemy, Strengthening Ourselves (ISBN 0-8330-3893-1) is a book written by Brian Michael Jenkins, one of the world's foremost authorities on terrorism. In it the author asserts that some of America's recent approaches to counterterrorism have been counterproductive.

The book is based in part on objective research, particularly as it applies to knowing the enemy, and it also includes the personal reflections of Brian Michael Jenkins, who draws on 40 years of terrorism research. Jenkins currently serves as Senior Advisor to the President of the RAND Corporation. The title Unconquerable Nation derives from a quote by the ancient Chinese strategist Sun Tzu, who 25 centuries ago wrote, "Being unconquerable lies with yourself."

Unconquerable Nation was published on August 22, 2006, by the RAND Corporation.

== The jihadist enterprise ==
Jenkins describes Islamism in terms of a worldwide "jihadist enterprise" directly at odds with the underpinnings of Western civilization. His book describes several strategic principles to guide the response of the West and particularly America:

- conserving resources for a long war
- waging an effective political warfare campaign
- breaking the cycle of jihadism
- maintaining international cooperation
- pre-empting attempts by terrorists to launch attacks involving weapons of mass destruction
- retaliating "in kind" against any state that provides WMD to a terrorist group
- rebuilding Afghanistan
- in Iraq, finding a way to reduce "insurgent, sectarian and predatory criminal violence to a level that permits social and political progress."
