= Sergio Salvioni =

Swiss Politician

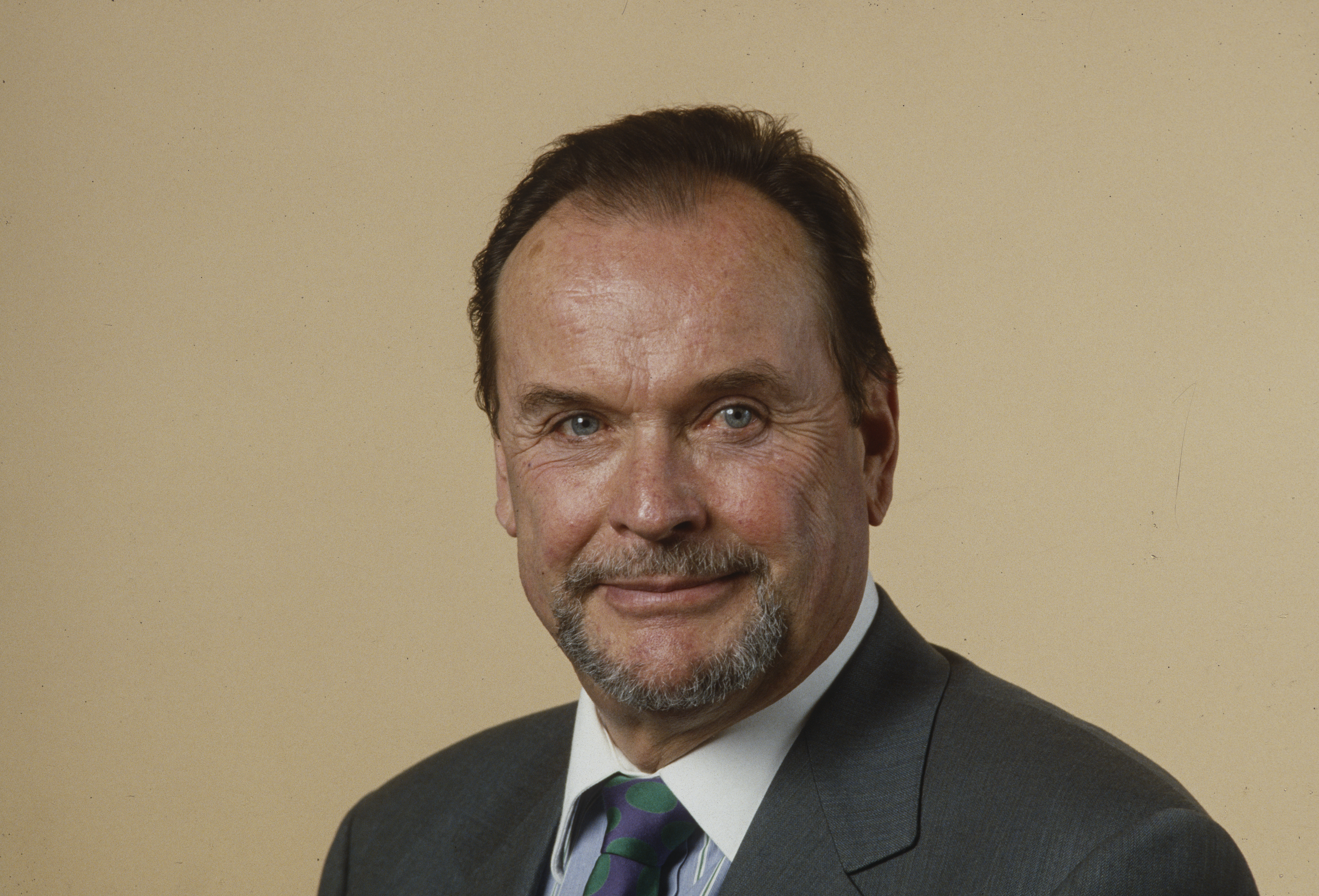
- Official portrait, 1987

Council of States member

Personal details
- Born: 18 June 1927; Bellinzona, Ticino, Switzerland
- Died: 27 August 2017 (aged 90); Locarno, Ticino, Switzerland
- Occupation: Politician; lawyer

Sergio Salvioni (1927-2017) was a Swiss politician and a member of the Swiss Council of States from the Canton of Ticino. He was the son of Arturo and Erminia Salvioni and grandnephew of Prof. Carlo Salvioni, professor of philology and dialectology at the University of Pavia.

== Personal and political life ==
Sergio Salvioni studied law at the Universities of Basel and Bern (1947–51), obtaining his doctorate in 1951 and completing specialised studies at the universities of Rome, Vienna and Berkeley, California. In 1953 he obtained a patent as a lawyer and notary and started a law office and notary in Locarno in 1962.

In 1986, he was appointed by the Philippine government as legal representative in Switzerland for the recovery of funds (US$684 Million) deposited in the Swiss Confederation by the former Philippine President Ferdinand Marcos. This effort was successful, and it was honoured by the 15th Philippine President Benigno Aquino III with the "Presidential Medal of Merit" together with Mr. Moritz Leuenberger, former Federal Councillor and President of the Swiss Confederation and Mr. Guy Fontanel, former Member of the Swiss Parliament on 11.02.2014.

Sergio Salvioni was a leading member of the radical wing of the Ticino's Free Democratic Party (FDP). He was a member of Ticino's Grand Council (1971–87), the Swiss National Council (1983–91) and the Swiss Council of States (1991–95). He paved the way for the Gotthard AlpTransit project with the parliamentary motion "Railway line through the Alps" of 14 June 1984.

He was member of the board of the Azienda elettrica ticinese (AET) from 1986 to 1989, and then President from 1989 to 1997. He was president of Swissmetro SA from 1995 to 2003, the purpose of which was to promote and develop the futuristic underground partial vacuum magnetic levitation passenger transport system of Switzerland. Under his leadership, the technical and economic feasibility of Swissmetro was confirmed in studies by the Swiss Federal Institutes of Technology (EPFL and ETHZ) and a consortium of Swiss Engineering and industrial companies. Despite this, the Swissmetro project was not realised. At this time, the Swiss federal government was already absorbed with other national infrastructure projects (Bahn 2000, Gotthard AlpTransit, etc.). New efforts are now being made by the SwissMetro-NG association (NG=New Generation) to promote a modern version of the original project.
