= Preliminary Design of an Experimental World-Circling Spaceship =

1946 RAND study

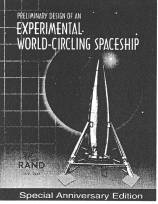

The "Preliminary Design of an Experimental World-Circling Spaceship" was a 1946 proposal by Project RAND for a United States satellite program. Robert M. Salter, James E. Lipp and one other person at RAND served as the editors of the report.

The Preliminary Design of an Experimental World-Circling Spaceship states, "A satellite vehicle with appropriate instrumentation can be expected to be one of the most potent scientific tools of the Twentieth Century. The achievement of a satellite craft would produce repercussions comparable to the explosion of the atomic bomb."
