= Franklin R. Collbohm =

American engineer

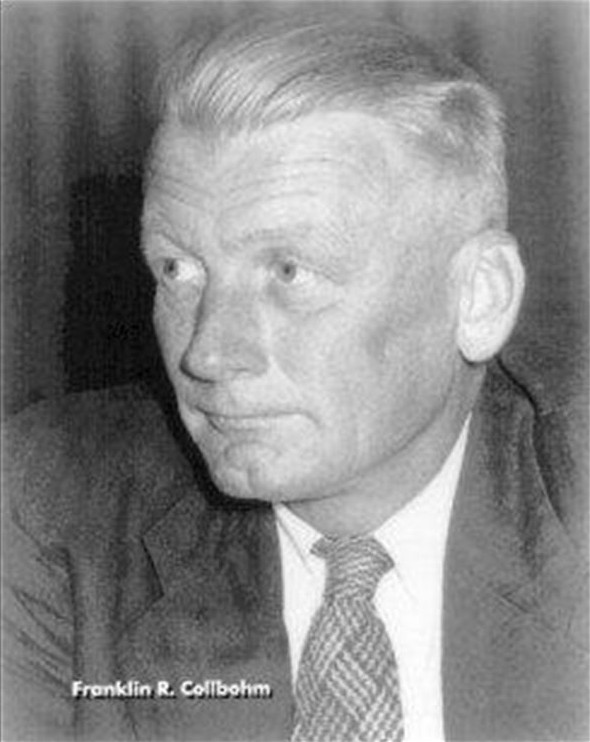
- Franklin R. Collbohm
- Born: January 31, 1907; New York City
- Died: February 12, 1990 (aged 83); United States
- Occupations: Engineer, founder of RAND Corporation

Franklin Rudolf Collbohm (January 31, 1907 – February 12, 1990) was an American aviation engineer.

== Biography ==
He was born on January 31, 1907, in New York City.

He died on February 12, 1990.

== Education ==
He studied engineering at the University of Wisconsin.

== Personal life ==
He was married to Katherine Collbohm and had three children.

== Career ==
He started his career as a test pilot for Douglas Aircraft.

He is most notable for being the founder of the RAND Corporation.

He has also collaborated with Paul Baran for the development of networking infrastructure.

== Awards ==
He has received the Defense Department's Distinguished Public Service Medal and also the U.S. Air Force’s Exceptional Service Award.
