= Vactrain =

Train inside a vacuum tube

A vactrain (short for vacuum tube train) is a proposed type of high-speed transport system where vehicles travel through partially evacuated tubes or tunnels. By operating in a partial vacuum, air resistance is drastically reduced, allowing for higher speeds than conventional ground transportation, theoretically up to 4,000 km/h (2,500 mph).

Vactrains have been proposed from 1906, and developed as scale models since 1917. (Note: Weinburg tested levitation and propulsion systems from "2-3 years ago" in 1914, but the tests were not done in vacuum. Vacuum test had occurred by 1917.) Most vactrain concepts use maglev technology to lift and propel the vehicle.

== 18th century ==
In 1799, George Medhurst of London conceived of and patented an atmospheric railway that could convey people or cargo through pressurized or evacuated tubes. The early atmospheric railways and pneumatic tube transport systems (such as the Dalkey Atmospheric Railway) relied on steam power for propulsion.

== 19th century ==
In 1888, Michel Verne, son of Jules Verne, imagined a submarine pneumatic tube transport system that could propel a passenger capsule at speeds up to 1,800 km/h (1,100 mph) under the Atlantic Ocean (a transatlantic tunnel) in a short story called "An Express of the Future".

== 20th century ==
The vactrain proper was invented by Robert H. Goddard as a freshman at Worcester Polytechnic Institute in the United States in 1904. Goddard subsequently refined the idea in a 1906 short story called "The High-Speed Bet", which was summarized and published in a Scientific American editorial in 1909 called "The Limit of Rapid Transit". Esther, his wife, was granted a US patent for the vactrain in 1950, five years after his death.

In 1909, Russian professor Boris Weinberg built the world's first model of his proposed version of the vactrain at Tomsk Polytechnic University. He later published a vactrain concept in 1914 in the book Motion without friction (airless electric way).

In 1955, in his novel The Magellan Nebula, Polish science-fiction writer Stanisław Lem wrote about an intercontinental vactrain called "organowiec", which moved in a transparent tube at a speed higher than 1,666 km/h (1,035 mph). In April 1962, the vactrain appears in the story "Mercenary" by Mack Reynolds, where he mentions Vacuum Tube Transport in passing.

During the 1970s, a leading vactrain advocate, Robert M. Salter of RAND Corporation, published a series of elaborate engineering articles.

An interview with Robert Salter appeared in the Los Angeles Times (June 11, 1972). He discussed, in detail, the relative ease with which the U.S. government could build a tube shuttle system using technologies available at that time. Maglev being poorly developed at the time, he proposed steel wheels. The chamber's door to the tube would be opened, and enough air admitted behind to accelerate the train into the tube. Gravity would further accelerate the departing train down to cruise level. Rising from cruise level, the arriving train would decelerate by compressing the rarefied air ahead of it, which would be vented. Pumps at the stations would make up for losses due to friction or air escaping around the edges of the train, the train itself requiring no motor. This combination of modified (shallow) gravity train and atmospheric railway propulsion would consume little energy but limit the system to subsonic speeds, hence initial routes of tens or hundreds of miles or kilometers rather than transcontinental distances were proposed.

Trains were to require no couplers, each car being directly welded, bolted, or otherwise firmly connected to the next, the route calling for no more bending than the flexibility of steel could easily handle. At the end of the line, the train would be moved sideways into the end chamber of the return tube. The railway would have both an inner evacuated tube and an outer tunnel. At cruise depth, the space between would have enough water to float the vacuum tube, softening the ride.

A route through the Northeast Megalopolis was laid out, with nine stations, one each in Washington DC, Maryland, Delaware, Pennsylvania, New York, Rhode Island, Massachusetts, and two in Connecticut. Commuter rail systems were mapped for the San Francisco and New York areas, the commuter version having longer, heavier trains, to be propelled less by air and more by gravity than the intercity version. The New York system was to have three lines, terminating in Babylon, Paterson, Huntington, Elizabeth, White Plains, and St. George.

Salter pointed out how such a system would help reduce the environmental damage being done to the atmosphere by aviation and surface transportation. He called underground Very High Speed Transportation (tube shuttles) his nation's "logical next step". The plans were never taken to the next stage.

At the time these reports were published, national prestige was an issue as Japan had been operating its showcase shinkansen for several years and maglev train research was hot technology. The American Planetran would establish a transcontinental subway service in the United States and provide a commute from Los Angeles to New York City in one hour. The tunnel would be buried to a depth of several hundred feet in solid rock formations. Construction would make use of lasers to ensure alignment and use tungsten probes to melt through igneous rock formations. The tunnel would maintain a partial vacuum to minimize drag. A trip would average 4,800 km/h (3,000 mph) and subject passengers to accelerations up to 1.4 times that of gravity, requiring the use of gimballed compartments. Enormous construction costs (estimated as high as US$1 trillion) were the primary reason why Salter's proposal was never built.

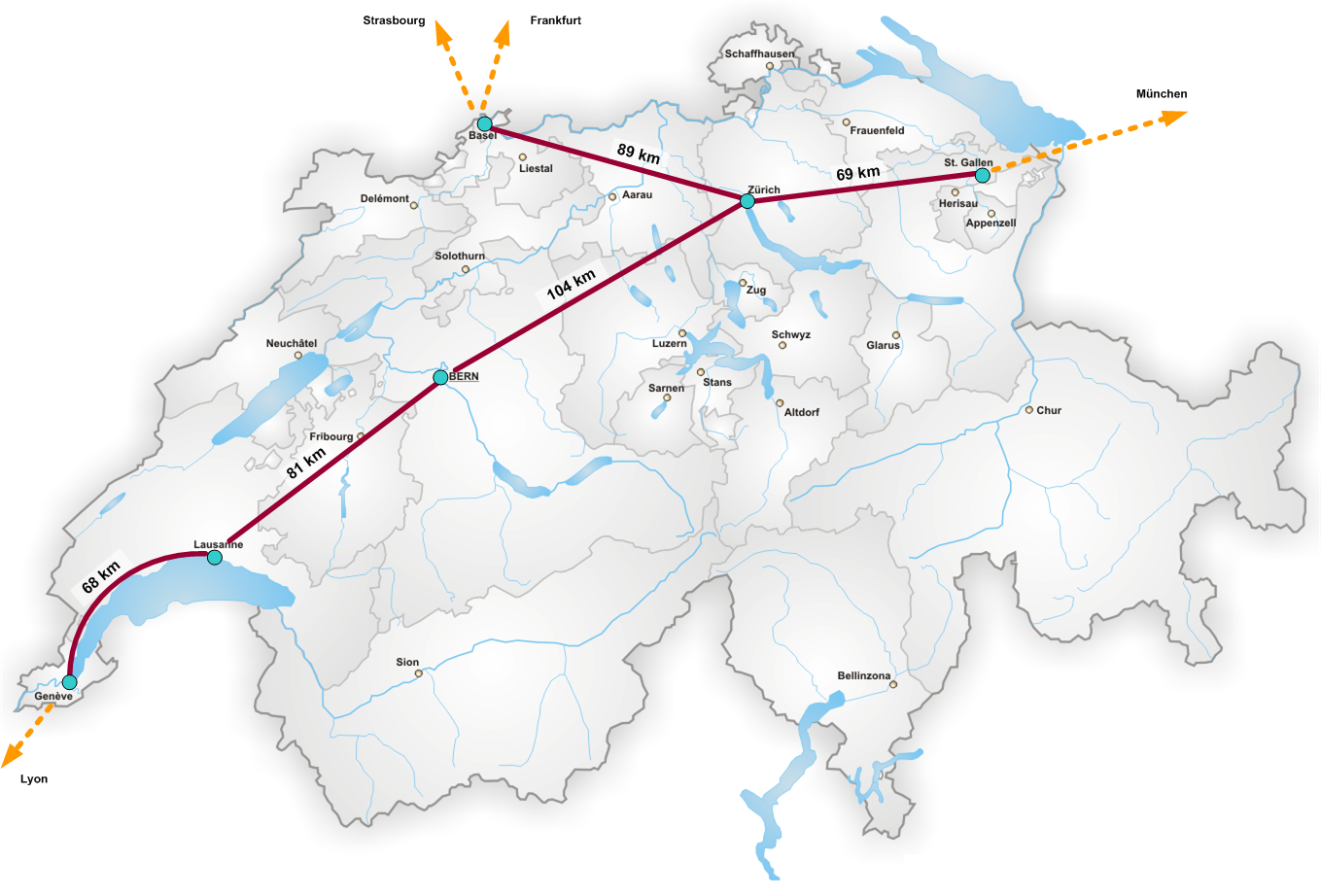
Swissmetro as proposed in 2005

Starting in the late 1970s and early 1980s, the Swissmetro was proposed to leverage the invention of the experimental German Transrapid maglev train, and operate in large tunnels reduced to the pressure altitude of 21,000 m (68,000 ft) at which the Concorde SST was certified to fly.

In the 1980s, Frank P. Davidson, a founder and chairman of the Channel Tunnel project, and Japanese engineer Yoshihiro Kyotani tackled the transoceanic problems with a proposal to float a tube above the ocean floor, anchored with cables (a submerged floating tunnel). The transit tube would remain at least 300 m (1,000 ft) below the ocean surface to avoid water turbulence.

On November 18, 1991, Gerard K. O'Neill filed a patent application for a vactrain system. He called the company he wanted to form VSE International, for velocity, silence, and efficiency. However, the concept itself he called Magnetic Flight. The vehicles, instead of running on a pair of tracks, would be elevated using electromagnetic force by a single track within a tube (permanent magnets in the track, with variable magnets on the vehicle), and propelled by electromagnetic forces through tunnels. He estimated the trains could reach speeds of up to 4,000 km/h (2,500 mph) – about five times faster than a jet airliner – if the air was evacuated from the tunnels. To obtain such speeds, the vehicle would accelerate for the first half of the trip, and then decelerate for the second half of the trip. The acceleration was planned to be a maximum of about one-half of the force of gravity. O'Neill planned to build a network of stations connected by these tunnels, but he died two years before his first patent on it was granted.

== 21st century ==
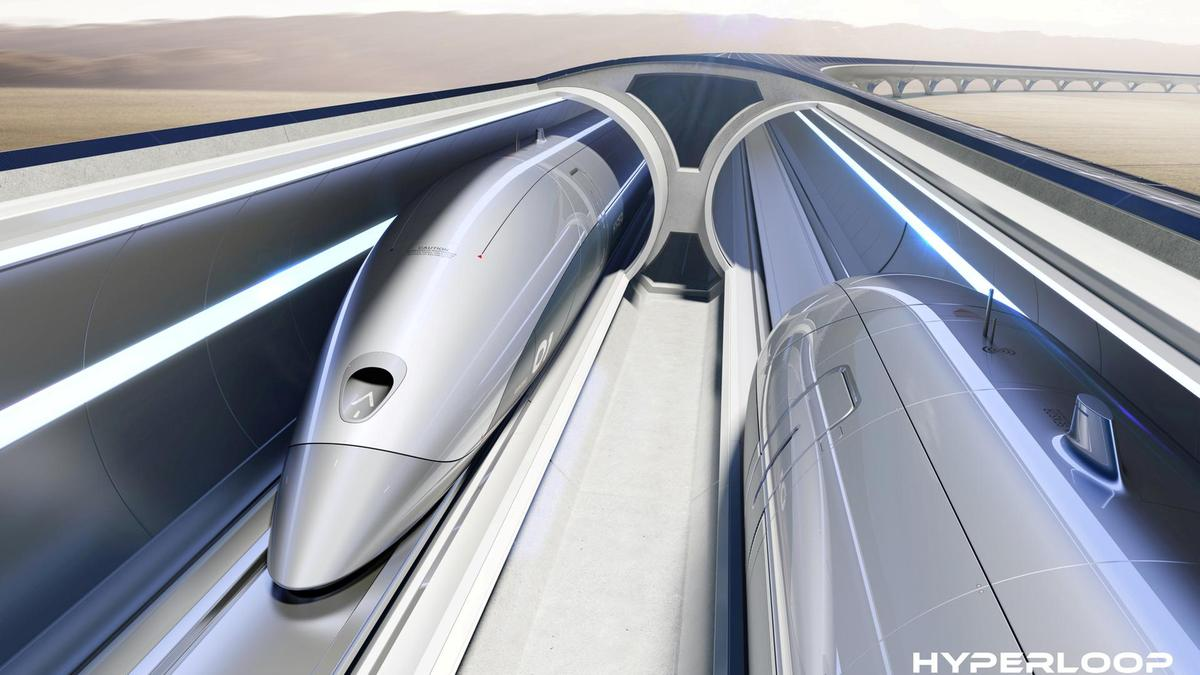
An image of a proposed implementation of the Hyperloop system

In 2001, James R. Powell – a co-inventor of superconducting maglev in the 1960s – began leading an investigation into the prospect of using a maglev vactrain for space launch, dubbed StarTram. Theoretically, this would incur two orders of magnitude less cost than current rockets. The StarTram proposal would have vehicles reach up to 14,300 to 31,500 km/h (8,900 to 19,600 mph) within a lengthy acceleration tunnel.

ET3 claim to have achieved some work that resulted in a patent on "evacuated tube transport technology" which was granted in 2009. They presented their idea in 2013 on public stage.

In August 2013 Elon Musk, CEO of Tesla and SpaceX, published the Hyperloop Alpha paper, proposing and examining a route running from the Los Angeles region to the San Francisco Bay Area, roughly following the Interstate 5 corridor. The Hyperloop concept has been explicitly "open-sourced" by Musk and SpaceX, and others have been encouraged to take the ideas and further develop them.

To that end, a few companies have been formed, and several interdisciplinary student-led teams are working to advance the technology. SpaceX built an approximately 1-mile-long (1.6 km) subscale track for its pod design competition at its headquarters in Hawthorne, California.

=== China ===
In December 2023, Yuan Shenggao reported that China was building a vactrain test track in Datong, and was two years into the project. A 2 km (1.2 mi) line in Yanggao was completed in November 2023 and trials of magnetic propulsion, elevation of up to 10 cm (3.9 in), brakes and maximum speed, were successful in 2024. Extensions are planned to 5 km (3.1 mi) about 2026 and finally to 60 km (37 mi).

== See also ==
- Beach Pneumatic Transit
