= James Thomson (executive) =

James JA. Thomson is an American businessman who was the RAND Corporation's president and chief executive officer from August 1989 through October 2011 and a member of the RAND staff since 1981.

== Education ==
Thomson holds a B.S. in physics from the University of New Hampshire (1967) and an M.S. and Ph.D. in physics from Purdue University. He was a postdoctoral research associate in physics (1972) and did basic research in experimental nuclear physics (1972–1974) at the University of Wisconsin–Madison. He has honorary doctorates from Purdue University, Pepperdine University, and the University of New Hampshire.

== Career ==
Thomson previously served as director of RAND's research programs in national security, foreign policy, defense policy, and arms control; vice president in charge of the Project AIR FORCE division; and executive vice president.

From 1977 to January 1981, Thomson was a member of the National Security Council staff at the White House, where he was primarily responsible for defense and arms control matters related to Europe. He was on the staff of the Office of the Secretary of Defense, 1974-1977.

== Affiliations ==
Thomson is a member of the Council on Foreign Relations, New York; the International Institute for Strategic Studies, London; and the board of the Los Angeles World Affairs Council. He is a director of AK Steel Corporation, Encysive Pharmaceuticals, and Object Reservoir.

== Articles ==
- Unclassified Work at RAND
