= Carlo Salvioni =

Swiss romanist and linguist

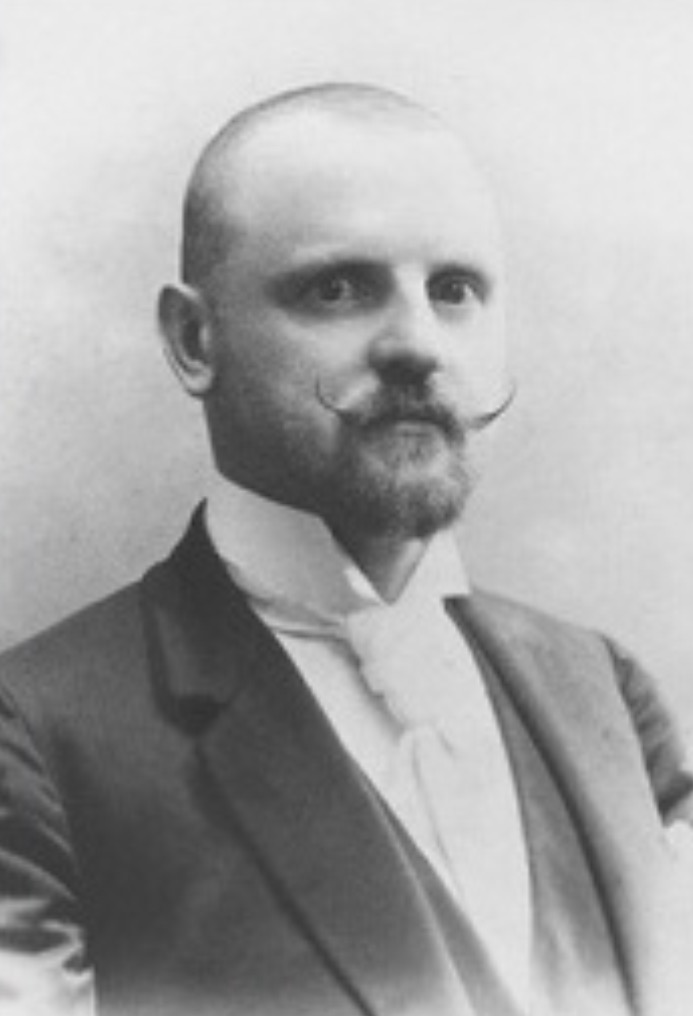
Image of Carlo Salvioni

Carlo Salvioni (3 March 1858, Bellinzona – 20 October 1920, Milan) was a Swiss romanist and linguist.

== Biography ==
He was born in Switzerland, in the capital of the Canton of Ticino, where his printer father also ran a bookshop. During secondary school in Lugano, Carlo Salvioni became acquainted with young anarchists such as Mikhail Bakunin. After interrupting both secondary school and university studies in Basel prematurely, in 1878 Salvioni moved to Germany to enroll at the university of Leipzig, which Tristano Bolelli (1913–2001) called una delle capitali della glottologia del tempo (one of the capitals of linguistics of the time). Here Salvioni's linguistic studies, based on the school of neo-grammarians, took place with regularity and depth of commitment for five years, from 1878 to 1883. His linguistic studies, however, did not exclude his political interests, which expressed themselves in German socialism.

In 1880, during his stay in Leipzig, he met the great Italian linguist Graziadio Isaia Ascoli and from this meeting his interest in Italian dialectology was born. This interest would fill Salvioni's entire life as a scholar. His doctoral (i.e laurea) thesis, entitled Fonetica del dialetto moderno della città di Milano (Phonetics of the modern dialect of the city of Milan), was published in one volume in 1884. His thesis was the first of his many important contributions to research on dialects, especially from Lombardy, Piedmont and Veneto, but also from the south and islands. Salvioni left some important projects unfinished, such as the edition of Carlo Porta's collected works, the Vocabolario etimologico italiano (Italian etymological vocabulary), and other works.

He obtained his doctorate in 1883, two years later he was appointed a free docent in Turin and was then a professor ordinarius at the University of Pavia, until 1902. In that year, after directing the prestigious journal Archivio glottologico italiano, he became Ascoli's successor at the Accademia scientifico-letteraria di Milano. In 1889 he became senator of the Kingdom of Italy. In 1907 he founded the comprehensive, multi-volume Vocabolario dei dialetti della Svizzera italiana (Vocabulary of the dialects of Italian Switzerland), to which he contributed until the last days of life, with the collaboration of his student Clemente Merlo (1879–1960).

Shortly after the outbreak of World War I, Salvioni's private life was marked by two very serious losses. His two sons, Ferruccio and Enrico, both died during the first few months of the conflict, after joining the Italian army as volunteers. In October 1929, Salvioni was working on the preparation of a book in memory of his two sons who died in the war, when he died suddenly at the age of 62.

In 2008 the Centro di dialettologia e di etnografia (Dialectology and Ethnography Center) of Bellinzona organized a conference for the 150th anniversary of the birth of Carlo Salvioni and for the centenary of the foundation of the Vocabolario dei dialetti della Svizzera italiana (Vocabulary of the dialects of Italian-speaking Switzerland). A street in the center of Bellinzona is named in honor of Salvioni.

== Selected publications ==
- Fonetica del dialetto moderno della città di Milano. Saggio linguistico, Torino, Ermanno Loescher, 1884.
- Lamentazione metrica sulla Passione di N. S. in antico dialetto pedemontano, Torino, Vincenzo Bona, 1889.
- Illustrazioni linguistiche e lessico alle Rime di B. Cavassico, 2 voll., Bologna, Romagnoli Dall'Acqua, 1893-1894.
- Dell'antico dialetto pavese, Pavia, Tip. F.lli Fusi, 1902.
- Appunti sull'antico e moderno lucchese, in «Archivio», XVI, 1905.
- Di qualche criterio dell'indagine etimologica, in «Annuario dell'Accademia di scienze e lettere», Milano, 1905-1906, pp. 17-41.
- Per la fonetica e la morfologia delle parlate meridionali d'Italia, in «Studi dell'Accademia scientifico-letteraria di Milano», 1913, pp. 79-113.
- Osservazioni sull'antico vocalismo milanese desunto dal metro e dalla rima del Codice berlinese di Bonvesin da Riva, in Miscellanea in onore di Pio Rajna, Firenze, Tipografia Ariani, 1911.

== See also ==
- Sergio Salvioni
