= Truth Decay (book) =

2018 non-fiction book by Jennifer Kavanagh and Michael Rich

- Author: Jennifer Kavanagh and Michael Rich
- Language: English
- Genre: Non-fiction
- Publisher: RAND Corporation
- Publication date: January 16, 2018
- Publication place: United States

Truth Decay is a non-fiction book by Jennifer Kavanagh and Michael D. Rich. Published by the RAND Corporation on January 16, 2018, the book examines historical trends such as "yellow journalism" and "new journalism" to demonstrate that "truth decay" is not a new phenomenon in American society. The authors argue that the divergence between individuals over objective facts and the concomitant increase in the relative "volume and influence of opinion over fact" in civil and political discourse has historically proliferated American society and culminated in truth decay.

The term "truth decay" was suggested by Sonni Efron and adopted by the authors of the book to characterize four interrelated trends in American society.

Kavanagh and Rich describe the "drivers" of truth decay as cognitive prejudices, transformation of information systems, competing demands on the education system, and polarization. This has consequences on various aspects of American society. The authors argue that truth decay has engendered the deterioration of "civil discourse" and "political paralysis". This has culminated in an increasing withdrawal of individuals from institutional sites of discourse throughout modern American society.

Truth Decay was positively received by audiences. The book was a nonfiction bestseller in the United States. Indeed, Barack Obama included the "very interesting" book in his 2018 reading list. Further, it stimulated a panel discussion at the University of Sydney on the role of media institutions in society and the ways in which democratic governance and civic engagement can be improved.

== Publishing history ==
Truth Decay was first published as a web-only book on January 16, 2018, by the RAND corporation. This allowed individuals to read the book online without incurring any costs. On 26 January 2018, physical copies of the book were also published by the RAND corporation and made available for order on websites such as Amazon and Apple Books.

The RAND corporation is a non-profit and nonpartisan research organization that is based in California. It is concerned about the social, economic and political dangers that truth decay poses to the decision-making processes of individuals in society. Kavanagh, a senior political scientist, has expressed concern that there is an increasing number of people in America and Europe are doubtful of climate change and the efficacy of vaccines.

== The term truth decay ==
In Chapter 1, Kavanagh and Rich introduce the term “truth decay”. The term “truth decay” was suggested by Sonni Efron and adopted by the authors of the book to characterize four interrelated trends in American society, including:

- Increasing differences between individuals about objective facts;
- Increasing conflation of opinion and fact in discourse;
- Increasing quantity and authority of opinion rather than fact in discourse; and
- Diminishing faith in traditionally authoritative sources of reliable and accurate information.

Kavanagh and Rich differentiate truth decay from “fake news”. The authors argue that phenomena such as “fake news” have not, in themselves, catalyzed the shift away from objective facts in political and civil discourse. The authors allege that “fake news” constitutes an aspect of truth decay and the associated challenges arising from the diminishing faith in historically authoritative sources of accurate information such as government, media and education. Notwithstanding this distinction, the authors argue that the expression “fake news” has been intentionally deployed by politicians such as Donald Trump and Vladimir Putin to diminish the accuracy and facticity of information promulgated by sources that do not align with their partisan position. In that context, the authors argue that a limited focus on phenomena such as “fake news” inhibits a vigorous analysis of the causes and consequences of truth decay in society.

== Structure and major arguments ==
Truth Decay is organized in six chapters and explores three historical eras — the 1890s, 1920s, and 1960s — for historical evidence of the four trends of Truth Decay. The authors argue that Truth Decay is “not a new phenomenon” as there has been a sustained increase in the volume and influence of opinion over fact throughout the last century.

== Historical context ==
In Chapter 3, the book explores three eras — the 1890s, 1920s, and 1960s — for historical evidence of the aforementioned four trends of truth decay in American society.

=== Gilded Age ===
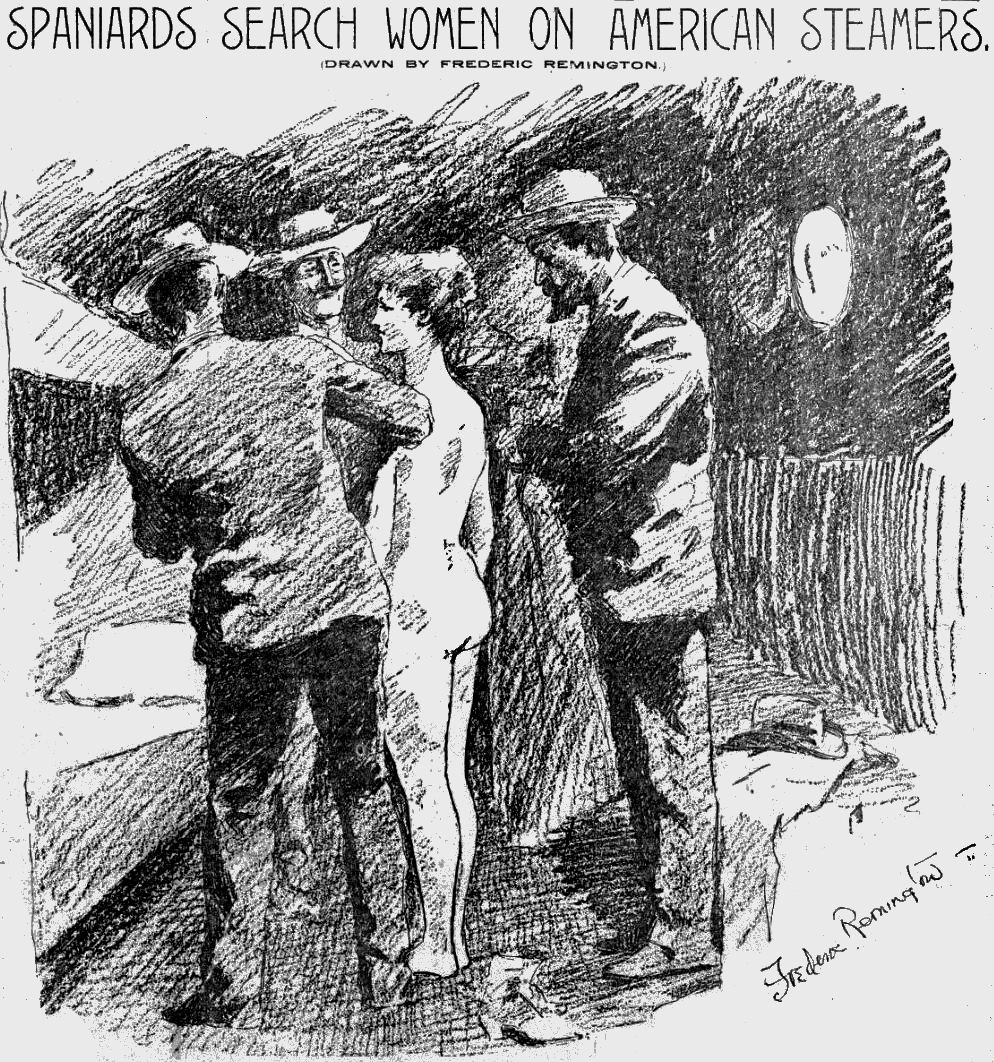
Depiction of a young woman being strip-searched by imposing Spanish policemen (Illustrator: Frederic Remington)

First, the authors identify the 1880s–1890s as the "Gilded Age". This historical era commenced after the American Civil War and was punctuated by the industrialization of America. The introduction of printing technology increased the output of newspaper publishers. This stimulated competition within the newspaper publishing industry. In New York City, major newspaper publishers Joseph Pulitzer and William Hearst engaged in "yellow journalism" by deploying a sensationalist style of covering politics, world events and crime in order to fend off competitors and attract market share. The authors note that these publishers also deployed "yellow journalism" to advance the partisan political objectives of their respective news organizations. For example, in April 1898, the New York Journal owned by Hearst published a number of articles with bold headlines, violent images and aggrandized information to position the Cubans as "innocent" people being "persecuted by the illiberal Spanish" regime and thereby emphasize the propriety of America's intervention in the Spanish-American War to the audience. Thus, "yellow journalism" caused a conflation of opinions and objectively verifiable facts in society.

=== Roaring Twenties and the Great Depression ===
Second, the authors identify the 1920s–1930s as the Roaring Twenties and the Great Depression. This historical era was renowned as another period of economic growth and development that catalysed significant changes in the American media industry. The authors argue that radio broadcasting and tabloid journalism emerged as a dramatized form of media that focused on news surrounding public figures such as politicians, actors, musicians and sports athletes as entertainment rather than reliable and accurate information for the audience to utilise in considered decision-making. As such, "jazz journalism" is alleged to have amplified the conflation of opinions and objectively verifiable facts in society.

=== The Civil Rights Movement ===
Third, the authors identify the 1960s–1970s as the period of "civil rights and social unrest". This historical era was punctuated by America's involvement in the Vietnam War. Television news was used to disseminate information which portrayed the appropriateness and success of America's involvement in the Vietnam War to the audience. Kavanagh and Rich argue that this increasingly conflated opinion and objective facts to advance partisan objectives. The Civil Rights movement in the 1960s contributed to a transformation in news reporting. Journalists began to deploy first-person narration in their reporting of world events to illuminate the inequities faced by African American citizens who strived for recognition and civil rights. On its face, this incidence of "new journalism" increased the risk of reporters imbuing their work with personal biases. Nonetheless, Bainer suggests that "new journalism" also augmented reporting as it permitted journalists to disseminate information on matters without the hollow pretence of objective reporting.

== Current drivers ==
In Chapter 4, Kavanagh and Rich describe the "drivers" of the aforementioned four trends of truth decay as cognitive prejudices, transformation of information systems and cuts to the education sector.

=== Cognitive prejudices ===
First, cognitive prejudices are described as systematic errors in rational thinking that transpire when individuals are absorbing information. Confirmation bias is the propensity to identify and prioritise information that supports a pre-existing worldview. This has a number of impacts on the process of individual decision-making. The authors argue that individuals consciously or unconsciously employ motivated reasoning to resist accepting information that challenges their pre-existing worldview. This causes the interface with invalidating information to further ingrain the partisan opinions of individuals. It is alleged by the authors that, in the long term, cognitive prejudices have created "political, sociodemographic, and economic polarisation" as individuals form cliques that are diametrically opposed in their worldview and communication, thereby attenuating the quality civil discourse in American society.

=== Transformation of information systems ===
Second, the transformation of information systems refers to the surge in the "volume and speed of news" that is disseminated to individuals. The authors note that the move towards a "24-hour news cycle" has increased the number of competitors to traditional news organizations. This competition, it is said, has reduced profitability and compelled news organizations such as ABC and Fox to pivot from costly investigative journalism to sensationalized opinion as a less-costly method of attracting an audience. The increase in the quantity of opinion rather than objectively discernible fact in reporting is further exacerbated by the introduction of social media platforms such as Twitter and Facebook. These social media platforms facilitate rapid access to, and dissemination of, opinion news to millions of users.

=== Cuts to the educational sector ===
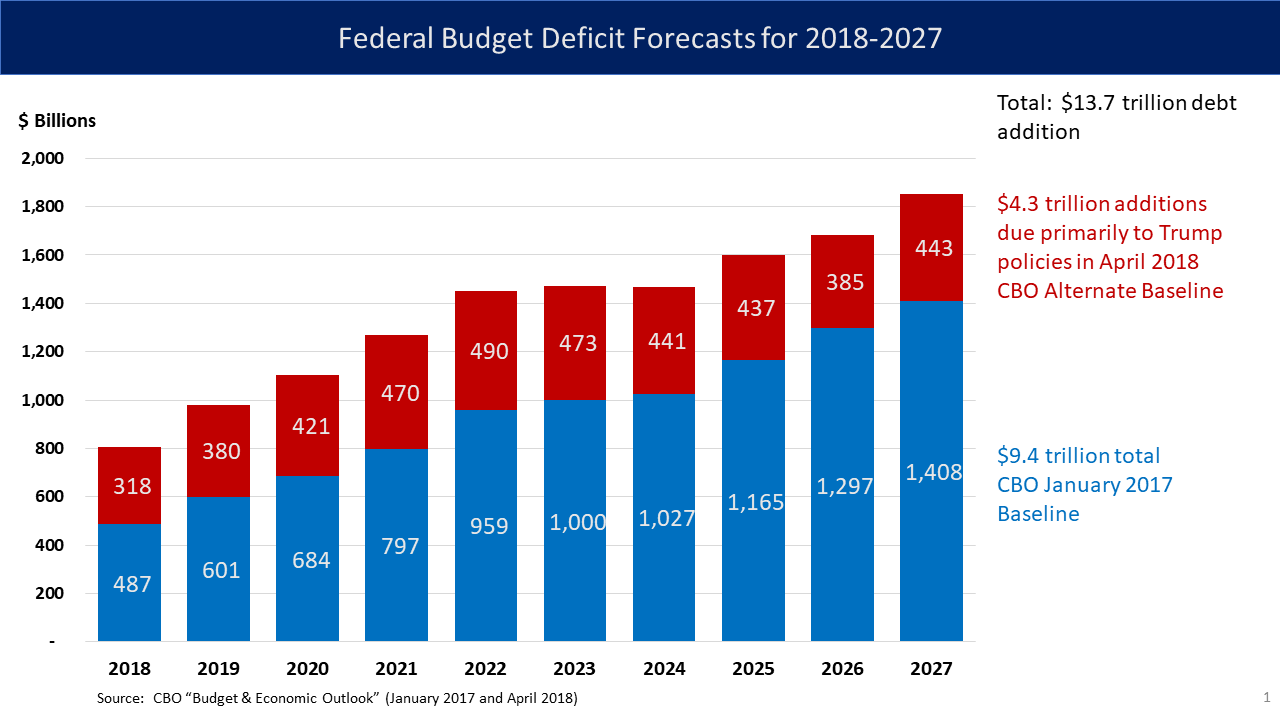
U.S. Federal Budget Deficit from 2018 to 2027

Third, the authors allege that cuts to the educational sector have catalyzed a reduction in the critical thinking and media literacy education of individuals. Kavanagh and Rich argue that individuals utilise the information and critical thinking skills established in traditionally authoritative sites of discourse such as secondary schools and universities to make decisions. Financial constraints associated with the swelling federal budget deficit from 2010 to 2021 have precipitated cuts to the funding apportioned to the American education sector. The authors argue that this has meant that, in the face of the increasing volume of online news, fewer students have acquired the technical and emotional skills to identify the explicit and implicit biases of reporters and thereby critically assess the accuracy and reliability of information emanating from sources such as the government and media. Ranschaert uses data gained through a longitudinal study of social studies teachers to argue that the decline in individuals relying on teachers for authoritative information has serious implications for ability of the education system to act as a buffer against truth decay. The authors go further than Ranschaert by arguing that, in the long term, this has resulted in a constituency that is vulnerable to absorbing and promoting misinformation as the skill to delineate objective facts from misinformation has atrophied. In that context, the disparity between the media literacy education of students and the challenges posed by Internet technology is said to engender truth decay.

== Current consequences ==
In Chapter 5, Kavanagh and Rich describe the consequences of truth decay in America.

=== Deterioration of civil discourse in society ===
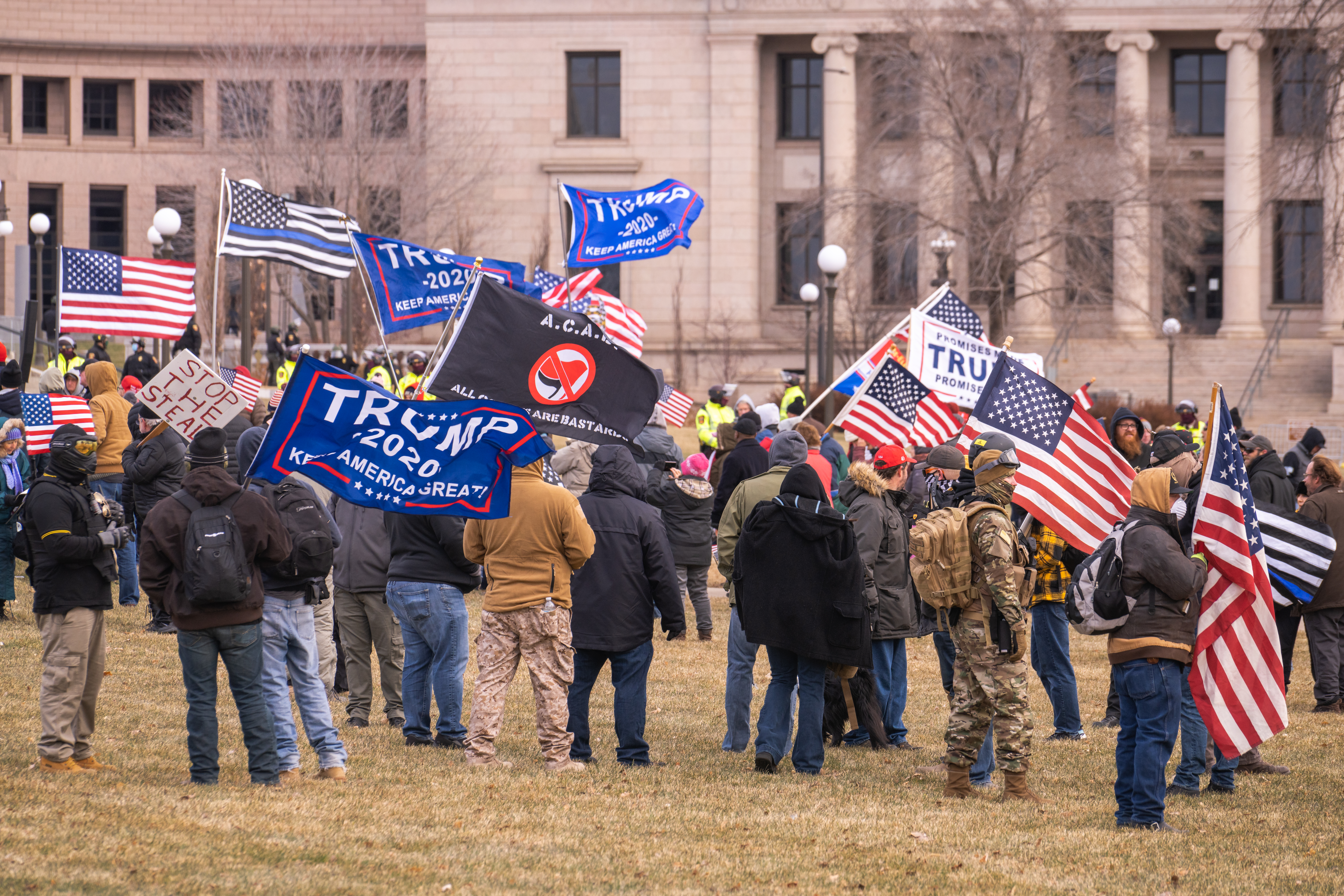
Violent protests at the Minnesota Capitol

First, it is alleged that truth decay manifests in the deterioration of civil discourse in modern American society. The authors define civil discourse as vigorous dialogue that attempts to promote the public interest. It follows that, in the absence of a baseline set of objective facts, the authors suggest that the ability for individuals and politicians to meaningfully listen and engage in a constructive dialogue about economics, science and policy is diminished.

=== Political paralysis ===
Second, truth decay is alleged to manifest in "political paralysis". The authors note that the deterioration of civil discourse and increasing dispute about objective facts has created a deep chasm between conservative and liberal politicians in America. A case study on the increasing use of the filibuster in the United States Senate between 1947 and 2017 is used to suggest that truth decay has culminated in conservative and liberal politicians being increasingly unable to compromise on a range of policy initiatives. This incurs short-term economic costs for the U.S. economy as the government becomes rigid an unable to respond promptly to domestic crises that require direct intervention. For example, America's federal government shut down in 2013 due to the inability of the Senate to pass the Affordable Care Act. The lack of funding for federal operations resulted in a $24 billion loss to the economy. In the long term, political paralysis also causes the U.S. to drop in international standing.

=== Withdrawal of individuals from institutional sites of discourse ===
Third, truth decay is alleged to have engendered the withdrawal of individuals from institutional sites of discourse. The authors argue that the decrease of faith in education institutions, media and government among young voters aged between 18 and 29 precipitated the consistent decrease in the overall number of votes cast in the U.S federal election from 2004 to 2016. This decrease in the exercise of civic responsibility through voting may, in the long run, diminish the ability of citizens to scrutinise state power, thereby diminishing policy making and overall accountability.

== Reception ==
Truth Decay was positively received by American audiences. The book debuted as a Nonfiction Bestseller in 2018. On Amazon.com, the book is rated 4.3 stars out of 5 stars.

The book subsequently stimulated a panel discussion at the University of Sydney. On 22 August 2018, Michael Rich joined Professor Simon Jackman, John Barron, Nick Enfield and Lisa Bero for a discussion of the causes and consequences of truth decay in modern society. This panel was co-hosted by the RAND Australia and the United States Studies Centre.

Excerpts from the book were published by CNN, ABC and the Washington Post. An article on the ABC website reported on the "troubling trend" of truth decay which was "exposed" by the authors of the book.

Barack Obama included the "very interesting" book in his 2018 summer reading list. Obama noted that "a selective sorting of facts and evidence" is deceitful and corrosive to civil discourse. This is because "society has always worked best when reasoned debate and practical problem-solving thrive". This notion was echoed by Cãtãlina Nastasiu, who lauded the "ambitious exploratory work" because it "serves as a base to better understand the information ecosystem".
