= Swissmetro =

Proposed Swiss vactrain transport system

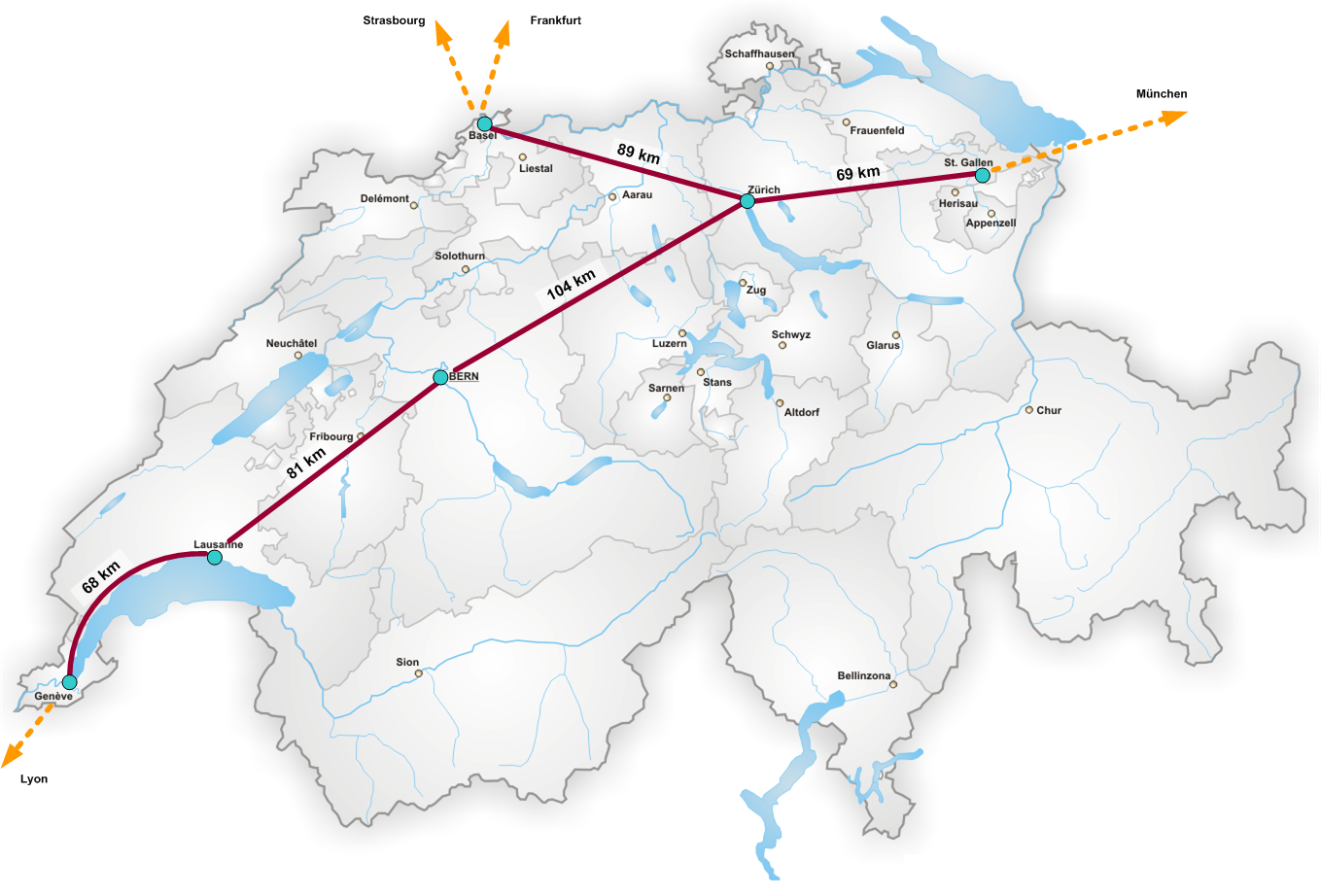
Swissmetro Network (proposal from 2005)

Swissmetro is a proposed Swiss transportation system based on vacuum-train (also known as vactrain) technology. It was invented by Swiss engineer Rodolphe Nieth in 1974 and it is presently being promoted and developed as SwissMetro-NG ("NG" for New Generation).

== Technology ==
The Swissmetro project was presented in a special report by Rodolphe Nieth, Martin Steiger and Jean-Francois Braillard in 1980. It proposed vehicles travelling at very fast speeds in a network of underground tunnels. Rolling resistance was eliminated with magnetic levitation, as in the Transrapid of Germany and air resistance was reduced by lowering the air pressure in the tunnels to around 10% of the normal atmospheric pressure. Propulsion was electrical (linear motors). The travel time between Bern and Zürich would have been reduced from around 1 hour by intercity train or motorcar to a mere 12 minutes with Swissmetro.

== Objectives ==
The objectives were to connect Swiss urban centres with a fast, modern, sustainable, transport system and reduce or even eliminate the congestion on the Swiss highways and railways without negatively impacting the Swiss landscapes and cities.

== History ==
The system was developed by Swissmetro Ltd., with Swiss senator of the Canton of Ticino, Dr. Sergio Salvioni as president. The research and development were led by EPFL Professor Marcel Jufer. This was done by the Swiss Federal Institutes of Technology (EPFL and ETHZ) and Swiss engineering and industrial companies with some financial support of the Swiss Federal Government. The project was ready to be implemented and an application for a concession for a pilot track between Geneva and Lausanne was made in 1998. At this time, however, the Swiss Federal Government was already fully absorbed with large national infrastructure projects (Rail 2000, Gotthard AlpTransit, etc.). In addition, the Swiss Federal office of Transportation (BAV-EVED) had some reservations (switch, capacity, safety, choice of the pilot track, financial concepts, etc.).

== Swissmetro-NG ==
SwissMetro-NG is the modern version of the original project. It is, so to speak, the version 2.0, which was proposed by the Swiss Transportation Research Institute. Air resistance and aerodynamic problems are eliminated altogether by removing all of the air in the tunnels. The tunnel diameter and consequently the overall costs are significantly reduced (around 50%). A new switch allows a drive-through operation without stopping. Long vehicle compositions with high capacities (over 1200 seats) as well as an extraordinarily high performance (supersonic) become possible. The reservations of the BAV-EVED are resolved.

The conditions for the resumption of the Swiss project are now very favourable (completion of Rail 2000 and Gotthard Alptransit, low interest rates, new technical advances, etc.). In addition, SwissMetro-NG meets all possible requirements regarding CO_{2} emissions, landscape protection, speed, sustainability, tourism, capacity, safety, costs, network capability, economic efficiency, etc. and it has proponents from all political colours and all corners of the country. The non-profit SwissMetro-NG association is promoting the project.

In 2017, Konrad Graber, Swiss senator of the Canton of Lucerne brought the SwissMetro-NG project to the attention of Parliament. It was positively received and decisions in its favour are being made. It is now becoming increasingly likely that SwissMetro-NG will be realized.

Because of its high performance and capacity, the system can draw traffic away from short-haul aviation and intercity highways and thus reduce CO_{2} emissions whilst simultaneously improving the transportation services. The travel time between the major Swiss cities, e.g. Geneva to Bern or Bern to Zürich, will be reduced to 12 minutes. In comparison, it still requires over 3 hours to traverse Switzerland today, independent of the mode of transportation and despite the small size of the country.

By exporting the system and the components, Switzerland will be able to help reduce CO_{2} emissions of intercity and transcontinental transportation on a global scale.

== See also ==
- Rail transport in Switzerland
- High-speed rail
  - High-speed rail in Switzerland
- SCMaglev
- Hyperloop
