= Interpretive journalism =

Journalism genre

Interpretive (or Interpretative) journalism or interpretative reporting requires a journalist to go beyond the basic facts related to an event and provide more in-depth news coverage. The lack of clear boundaries accompanied by diverse theoretical approaches related to what interpretative journalism is in the modern world results in the practice of interpretative journalism overlapping with various other genres of journalism, and furthermore operationalization of interpretative journalism becomes largely blurred. Interpretive journalists must have a deeper awareness and understanding of a subject their work involves, looking for systems, rationale and influences that explain what they are reporting.

== History ==
In his book Interpretative Reporting (1938) Curtis D. MacDongall wrote that during the beginning of the First World War most Americans were taken by surprise and were unable to understand the reasons why it started. This led to changes in the style of reporting.

During the 1920s events such as the Great Depression and the Nazi threat to global stability caused audiences to be no longer content with the five W's of journalism. In 1923, Time magazine launched as the first major publication to provide readers with a more analytical interpretation of the news. Many papers responded with a new type of reporting that became known as interpretative journalism.

The spread of interpretative reporting brought with it a number of variations such as new journalism, activism and advocacy journalism, adversary journalism, investigative journalism.

== See also ==
- Opinion Journalism
- Investigative Journalism
