= RAND Corporation =

American global policy think tank

The RAND Corporation

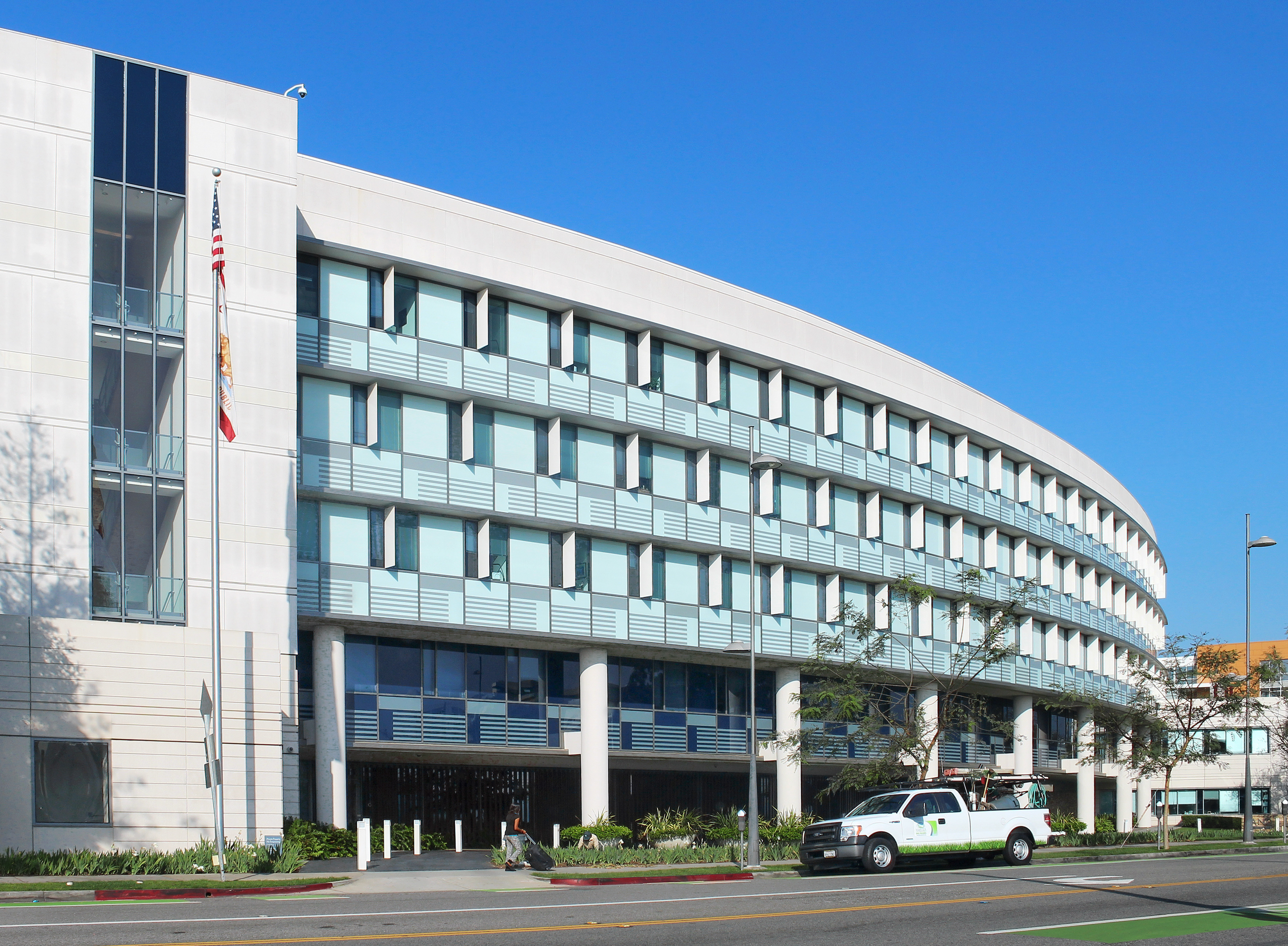
- Headquarters in Santa Monica, California
- Predecessor: Project RAND (partnership between Douglas Aircraft Company and the United States Air Force)
- Formation: May 14, 1948; 78 years ago
- Founders: Franklin R. Collbohm; Henry H. "Hap" Arnold; Donald Douglas; Curtis LeMay
- Type: Global policy think tank, research institute, and public sector consulting firm
- Tax ID no.: 95-1958142
- Legal status: Nonprofit corporation
- Purpose: Policy analysis; Research and development
- Headquarters: Santa Monica, California, U.S.
- Coordinates: 34.009599°N 118.490670°W
- Region served: Worldwide
- President and CEO: Jason Gaverick Matheny
- RAND Leadership: Jennifer Gould; Jim Mitre; Mike Januzik; Eric Peltz; Melissa Rowe; Robert M. Case
- President, RAND Europe: Hans Pung
- Board of directors: Michael E. Leiter (chair); Teresa Wynn Roseborough (vice chair); Joel Z. Hyatt; Peter Lowy; Michael Lynton; Mary E. Peters; David L. Porges; Donald B. Rice (emeritus); Leonard D. Schaeffer
- Subsidiaries: RAND Europe; Frederick S. Pardee RAND Graduate School
- Affiliations: Independent
- Revenue: ▲$556 million (2025)
- Disbursements: Numerous
- Expenses: ▲$544 million (2025)
- Endowment: ▲$355 million (2025)
- Staff: 2,000 (2024)
- Website: www.rand.org

The RAND Corporation, doing business as RAND, is an American nonprofit global policy think tank, research institute, and public sector consulting firm. RAND engages in research and development (R&D) in several fields and industries. Since the 1950s, RAND research has helped inform United States policy decisions on a wide variety of issues, including the Cold War space race, the U.S. involvement in the Vietnam War, the U.S.–Soviet nuclear arms confrontation, the creation of the social welfare programs of the Great Society, and national health care.

RAND originated as "Project RAND" (from the phrase "research and development") in the post-war period immediately after World War II. The U.S. Army Air Forces established Project RAND with the objective of investigating long-range planning of future weapons. The Douglas Aircraft Company was granted a contract to research intercontinental warfare. Project RAND later evolved into RAND, and expanded its research into civilian fields such as education and international affairs. It was the first think tank to be regularly referred to as a "think tank".

RAND receives both public and private funding. Its funding sources include the U.S. government, private endowments, corporations, universities, charitable foundations, U.S. state and local governments, international organizations, and to a small extent, foreign governments. In the 2024 fiscal year, the think tank's revenues and other support were $514 million, of which $328 million was provided by the U.S. federal government.

== Overview ==
RAND has approximately 1,850 employees. Its American locations include: Santa Monica, California (headquarters); Arlington, Virginia; Pittsburgh, Pennsylvania; and Boston, Massachusetts. The RAND Gulf States Policy Institute has an office in New Orleans, Louisiana. RAND Europe is located in Cambridge, United Kingdom; Brussels, Belgium; and The Hague, Netherlands. RAND Australia is located in Canberra, Australia.

RAND is home to the RAND School of Public Policy, one of eight original graduate schools in public policy and the first to offer a PhD. Its selective doctoral program provides an analytically rigorous and applied curriculum through coursework and collaboration with RAND researchers to address real-world policy challenges. The campus is at RAND's Santa Monica research facility and is the world's largest institution specializing in graduate-level education in policy analysis.

All PhD students receive fellowships to cover their education costs. This allows them to dedicate their time in research projects and provides them with on-the-job training. RAND also offers a number of internship and fellowship programs allowing students and others to assist in conducting research for RAND projects.

RAND publishes the RAND Journal of Economics, a peer-reviewed journal of economic sciences. Thirty-two recipients of the Nobel Prize, primarily in the fields of economics and physics, have been associated with RAND at some point in their career.

== History ==
=== Project RAND ===
RAND was created after individuals in the War Department, the Office of Scientific Research and Development, and industry began to discuss the need for a private organization to connect operational research with research and development decisions. The immediate impetus for the creation of RAND was a conversation in September 1945 between General Henry H. "Hap" Arnold and Douglas executive Franklin R. Collbohm. Both men were deeply worried that ongoing demobilization meant the federal government was about to lose direct control of the vast amount of American scientific brainpower assembled to fight World War II.

As soon as Arnold realized Collbohm had been thinking along similar lines, he said, "I know just what you're going to tell me. It's the most important thing we can do." With Arnold's blessing, Collbohm quickly pulled in additional people from Douglas to help, and together with Donald Douglas, they convened with Arnold two days later at Hamilton Army Airfield to sketch out a general outline for Collbohm's proposed project.

Douglas engineer Arthur Emmons Raymond came up with the name Project RAND, from "research and development". Collbohm suggested that he himself should serve as the project's first director, which he thought would be a temporary position while he searched for a permanent replacement for himself. He later became RAND's first president and served in that capacity until his retirement in 1967.

On 1 October 1945, Project RAND was set up under special contract to the Douglas Aircraft Company and began operations in December 1945. In May 1946, the Preliminary Design of an Experimental World-Circling Spaceship was released.

=== RAND ===
By late 1947, Douglas Aircraft executives had expressed their concerns that their close relationship with RAND might create conflict of interest problems on future hardware contracts. In February 1948, the chief of staff of the newly created United States Air Force approved the evolution of Project RAND into a nonprofit corporation, independent of Douglas.

On 14 May 1948, RAND was incorporated as a nonprofit corporation under the laws of the State of California and on 1 November 1948, the Project RAND contract was formally transferred from the Douglas Aircraft Company to RAND. Initial capital for the spin-off was provided by the Ford Foundation.

Since the 1950s, RAND research has helped inform United States policy decisions on a wide variety of issues, including the space race, the Vietnam War, the U.S.–Soviet nuclear arms confrontation, the creation of the Great Society social welfare programs, the digital revolution, and national health care. In the 1970s, New York City used RAND's computer models to determine which fire stations to close. Most of the closed stations were in relatively poor areas, such as South Bronx or Lower East Side.

RAND contributed to the doctrine of nuclear deterrence by mutually assured destruction (MAD), developed under the guidance of then-Defense Secretary Robert McNamara and based upon their work with game theory. Chief strategist Herman Kahn also posited the idea of a "winnable" nuclear exchange in his 1960 book On Thermonuclear War. This led to Kahn's being one of the models for the titular character of the film Dr. Strangelove, in which RAND is spoofed as the "BLAND Corporation".

Even in the late 1940s and early 1950s, long before Sputnik, the RAND project was secretly recommending to the US government a major effort to design a human-made satellite that would take photographs from space and the rockets to put such a satellite in orbit.

RAND was not the first think tank, but during the 1960s, it was the first to be regularly referred to as a "think tank". Accordingly, RAND served as the "prototype" for the modern definition of that term.

In the early 1990s, RAND established a European branch to serve clients across the public, private, and third sectors, including governments, charities, and corporations. RAND Europe is the European arm of RAND, and like its main branch, it is a nonprofit policy research organization dedicated to improving decision-making through evidence-based research and analysis. RAND Europe's stated mission is to improve policy and decision-making through rigorous, independent research. RAND Europe is incorporated in, and has offices in, Cambridge, The Hague, and Brussels.

== Research ==
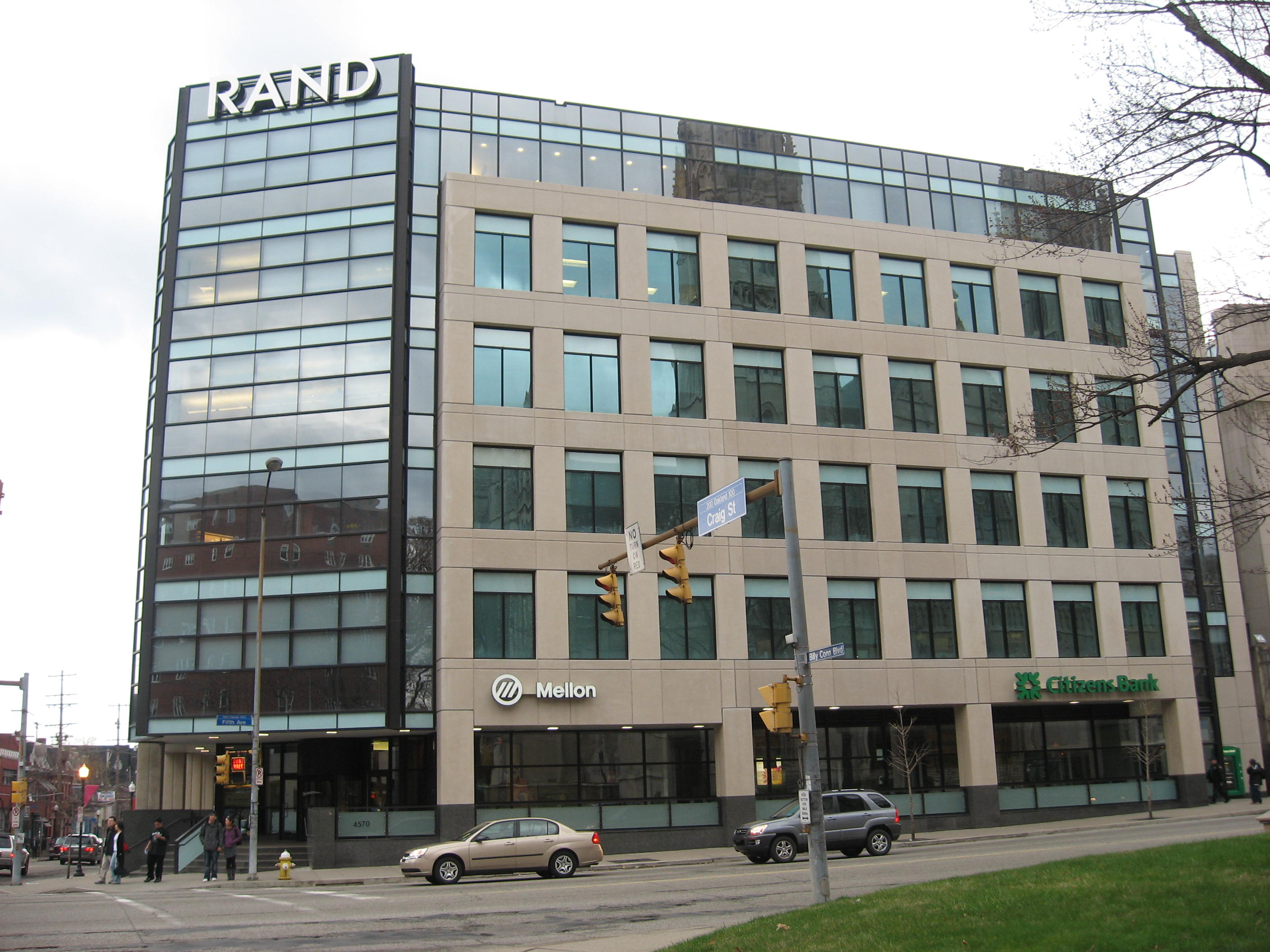
RAND, Pittsburgh, Pennsylvania

The research of RAND stems from its development of systems analysis. Important contributions are claimed in space systems and the United States' space program, in computing and in artificial intelligence. RAND researchers developed many of the principles that were used to build the Internet. RAND also contributed to the development and use of wargaming.

Current areas of expertise include: child policy, law, civil and criminal justice, education, health (public health and health care), international policy/foreign policy, labor markets, national security, defense policy, infrastructure, energy, environment, business and corporate governance, economic development, intelligence policy, long-range planning, crisis management and emergency management-disaster preparation, population studies, regional studies, comparative studies, science and technology, social policy, welfare, terrorism and counterterrorism, cultural policy, arts policy, and transportation.

=== Defense and national security ===
During the Cold War, RAND researchers contributed to the development of nuclear strategy concepts such as deterrence theory and mutually assured destruction. In recent years, RAND has analyzed military readiness, force modernization, and counterterrorism strategies. For example, one study examined the effectiveness of counterinsurgency operations in Iraq and Afghanistan.

=== Healthcare and public health ===
RAND designed and conducted one of the largest and most important studies of health insurance between 1974 and 1982. The RAND Health Insurance Experiment, funded by the then–U.S. Department of Health, Education and Welfare, established an insurance corporation to compare demand for health services with their cost to the patient.

In 2018, RAND began its Gun Policy in America initiative, which resulted in comprehensive reviews of the evidence of the effects of gun policies in the United States. The second expanded review in 2020 analyzed almost 13,000 relevant studies on guns and gun violence since 1995 and selected 123 as having sufficient methodological rigor for inclusion. These studies were used to evaluate scientific support for eighteen classes of gun policy. The review found supportive evidence that child-access prevention laws reduce firearm self-injuries (including suicides), firearm homicides or assault injuries, and unintentional firearm injuries and deaths among youth. Conversely, it identified that stand-your-ground laws increase firearm homicides and shall-issue concealed carry laws increase total and firearm homicides. RAND also emphasized that the absence of evidence is not evidence of absence. Both proponents and opponents of various gun control measures have cited the RAND initiative.

Additionally, RAND has researched the opioid epidemic and alcoholism.

=== Education ===
The RAND analysis of the Intensive Partnerships for Effective Teaching, a $575 million initiative from the Gates Foundation to increase teacher effectiveness, found that the interventions had no significant effect on student achievement.

=== Emerging technologies and innovation ===
RAND has examined the implications of emerging technologies such as artificial intelligence, cybersecurity threats, and autonomous systems. It was accused of working too closely with Open Philanthropy in its work on AI, at the risk of losing its independence. RAND employees have expressed concerns to Politico about the organization's objectivity after it was revealed that RAND helped draft the Executive Order on AI, following over $15 million in funding from a Facebook founder-backed Open Philanthropy. In December 2023, the House Science Committee sent a bipartisan letter to the National Institute of Standards and Technology raising concerns over RAND's "research that has failed to go through robust review processes, such as academic peer review." On September 13, 2024, the ranking member of the U.S. Senate Committee on Commerce, Science, and Transportation sent a letter to RAND to better understand its "involvement in the AI Executive Order and the administration's other actions related to online speech."

=== Other research areas ===
- Auto insurance
- City government
- Cold War and potential nuclear conflict
- Iraq War
- National health insurance
- Vietnam War
- Transparency in government

== Notable participants ==
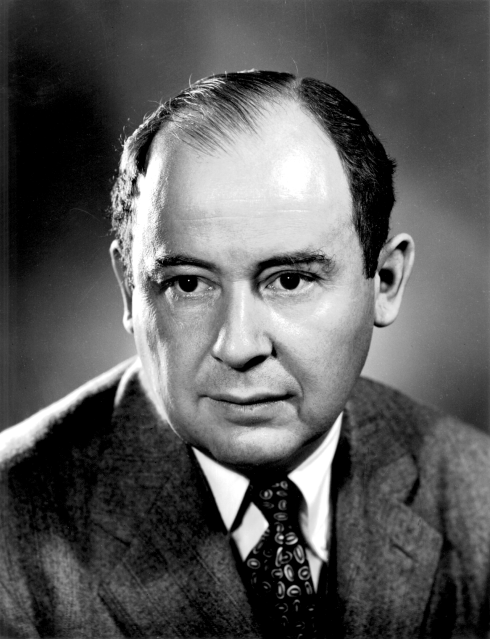
John von Neumann, consultant to RAND

- Henry H. "Hap" Arnold: General of the Air Force, United States Air Force
- Kenneth Arrow: economist, won the Nobel Prize in Economics, developed the impossibility theorem in social choice theory
- Bruno Augenstein: V.P., physicist, mathematician and space scientist
- Robert Aumann: mathematician, game theorist, won the Nobel Prize in Economics.
- J. Paul Austin: Chairman of the Board, 1972–1981
- Paul Baran: one of the developers of packet switching which was used in ARPANET and later networks like the Internet
- Richard Bellman: Mathematician known for his work on dynamic programming
- Yoram Ben-Porat: economist and President of the Hebrew University of Jerusalem
- Barry Boehm: worked in interactive computer graphics with RAND in the 1960s and had helped define the ARPANET in the early phases of that program
- Harold L. Brode: physicist, leading nuclear weapons effects expert
- Bernard Brodie: Military strategist and nuclear architect
- Samuel Cohen: inventor of the neutron bomb in 1958
- Franklin R. Collbohm: Aviation engineer, Douglas Aircraft Company, RAND founder and former director and trustee.
- Walter Cunningham: astronaut
- George Dantzig: mathematician, creator of the simplex algorithm for linear programming
- Linda Darling-Hammond: educational researcher, co-director, School Redesign Network
- Merton Davies: mathematician, pioneering planetary scientist
- Michael H. Decker: Senior International Defense Research Analyst
- Stephen H. Dole: Author of the book Habitable Planets for Man and head of Rand's Human Engineering Group
- Donald Wills Douglas, Sr.: President, Douglas Aircraft Company, RAND founder
- Hubert Dreyfus: philosopher and critic of artificial intelligence
- Karen Elliott House: Chairman of the Board, 2009–present, former publisher, The Wall Street Journal; former Senior Vice President, Dow Jones & Company, Inc.
- Daniel Ellsberg: economist and leaker of the Pentagon Papers
- Alain Enthoven: economist, Deputy Assistant Secretary of Defense from 1961 to 1965, Assistant Secretary of Defense for Systems Analysis from 1965 to 1969
- Stephen J. Flanagan, political scientist, National Security Council senior director
- Francis Fukuyama: academic and author of The End of History and the Last Man
- Horace Rowan Gaither: chairman of the board, 1949–1959, 1960–1961; known for the Gaither Report.
- David Galula, French officer and scholar
- James J. Gillogly: cryptographer and computer scientist
- Paul Y. Hammond: political scientist and national security scholar, affiliated 1964–79, program director 1973–76
- Anthony C. Hearn: developed the REDUCE computer algebra system, the oldest such system still in active use; co-founded the CSNET computer network
- Fred Iklé: US nuclear policy researcher
- Brian Michael Jenkins: terrorism expert, Senior Advisor to the President of RAND, and author of Unconquerable Nation
- Herman Kahn: theorist on nuclear war and one of the founders of scenario planning and Hudson Institute
- Amrom Harry Katz
- Konrad Kellen: research analyst and author, co-wrote open letter to U.S. government in 1969 recommending withdrawal from Vietnam War
- Zalmay Khalilzad: U.S. ambassador to United Nations
- Henry Kissinger: United States Secretary of State (1973–1977); National Security Advisor (1969–1975); Nobel Peace Prize Winner (1973)
- Ann McLaughlin Korologos: Chairman of the Board, April 2004 – 2009; Chairman Emeritus, The Aspen Institute
- Lewis "Scooter" Libby: United States Vice President Dick Cheney's former Chief of Staff
- Ray Mabus: Former ambassador, governor
- Harry Markowitz: economist, greatly advanced financial portfolio theory by devising mean variance analysis, Nobel Prize in Economics
- Andrew W. Marshall: military strategist, director of the U.S. DoD Office of Net Assessment
- Jason Gaverick Matheny: selected as president and CEO of RAND in 2022
- Margaret Mead: U.S. anthropologist
- Douglas Merrill: former Google CIO & President of EMI's digital music division
- Newton N. Minow: Chairman of the board, 1970–1972
- John Milnor: mathematician, known for his work in differential topology
- Chuck Missler: Bible teacher, engineer, chairman and CEO of Western Digital
- Lloyd Morrisett: Chairman of the board, 1986–1995
- John Forbes Nash, Jr.: mathematician, won the Nobel Prize in Economics
- Allen Newell: artificial intelligence
- Paul O'Neill: Chairman of the board, 1997–2000
- Edmund Phelps: winner of the 2006 Nobel Prize in Economics
- Arthur E. Raymond: Chief engineer, Douglas Aircraft Company, RAND founder
- Condoleezza Rice: former intern, former trustee (1991–1997), and former Secretary of State for the United States
- Michael D. Rich: RAND President and chief executive officer, 1 November 2011 – 5 July 2022
- Leo Rosten: academic and humorist, helped set up the social sciences division of RAND
- Albert S. Ruddy: programmer trainee, Oscar-winning producer of The Godfather and Million Dollar Baby
- Donald Rumsfeld: Chairman of board from 1981 to 1986; 1995–1996 and secretary of defense for the United States from 1975 to 1977 and 2001 to 2006.
- Robert M. Salter: advocate of the vactrain maglev train concept
- Paul Samuelson: economist, Nobel Prize in Economics
- Thomas C. Schelling: economist, won the 2005 Nobel Prize in Economics
- James Schlesinger: former secretary of defense and former secretary of energy
- Dov Seidman: lawyer, businessman and CEO of LRN
- Norman Shapiro: mathematician, co-author of the Rice–Shapiro theorem, MH Email and RAND-Abel co-designer
- Lloyd Shapley: mathematician and game theorist, won the Nobel Prize in Economics
- Cliff Shaw: inventor of the linked list and co-author of the first artificial intelligence program
- Abram Shulsky: former Director of the Pentagon's Office of Special Plans
- Herbert Simon: Political scientist, psychologist, won the 1978 Nobel Prize in Economics
- James Steinberg: Deputy National Security Advisor to Bill Clinton
- Ariane Tabatabai: former researcher
- Ratan Tata: Chairman Emeritus of Tata Sons
- James Thomson: RAND president and CEO, 1989 – 31 October 2011
- John von Neumann: mathematician, pioneer of the modern digital computer
- Willis Ware: JOHNNIAC co-designer, and early computer privacy pioneer
- William H. Webster: Chairman of the Board, 1959–1960
- Oliver Williamson: economist, won the 2009 Nobel Prize in Economics
- Albert Wohlstetter: mathematician and Cold War strategist
- Roberta Wohlstetter: policy analyst and military historian

== See also ==
- Federally funded research and development centers
- A Million Random Digits with 100,000 Normal Deviates (published by RAND)
- Truth Decay (also published by RAND)
