= Arthur Kantrowitz =

American engineer

- Born: October 20, 1913; New York City, US
- Died: November 29, 2008 (aged 95)
- Education: Columbia University
- Scientific career
- Fields: physics and engineering
- Workplaces: National Advisory Committee for Aeronautics; Cornell University; Dartmouth College

Arthur Robert Kantrowitz (October 20, 1913 – November 29, 2008) was an American scientist, engineer, and educator.

Kantrowitz grew up in The Bronx and graduated from DeWitt Clinton High School. He earned his B.S., M.A. and, in 1947, his Ph.D. degrees in physics from Columbia University.

== Early life ==
Kantrowitz was born in New York City on October 28, 1913. His mother was a costume designer and his father ran a clinic in the Bronx. As a child, Arthur built an electrocardiograph from old radio parts, working with his brother Adrian (who would go on to perform the first heart transplant in the United States.)

== Career ==
During his graduate studies at Columbia, Kantrowitz started working as a physicist in 1936 for the National Advisory Committee for Aeronautics (NACA), work he would continue for ten years. While obtaining his Ph.D., Kantrowitz was supervised by Edward Teller. In 1938, he began construction of the Diffusion Inhibitor, the first known attempt to build a working fusion power reactor. The name was deliberately chosen to disguise its purpose, but it was eventually found out and the funding was cancelled.

He went on to teach at Cornell University for the next ten years and later founded the Avco-Everett Research Lab (AERL) in Everett, Massachusetts, in 1955. He developed shock tubes, which were able to produce the extremely hot gases needed to simulate atmospheric re-entry from orbital speeds, thereby solving the critical nose cone re-entry heating problem and accelerating the development of recoverable spacecraft. He was AERL's director, chief executive officer, and chairman until 1978 when he took on a professorship at Dartmouth College. From 1956 to 1978 he also served as a vice president and director of Avco Corporation.

== Scientific contributions ==
Kantrowitz's interdisciplinary research in the area of fluid mechanics and gas dynamics led to contributions in the field of magnetohydrodynamics and to the development of high-efficiency, high-power lasers. He first suggested a system of laser propulsion to launch bulk payloads into orbit, using energy from ground-based lasers to increase exhaust velocity and thereby reduce the propellant-to-payload mass ratio. His concepts on laser propulsion were published in 1988.

His early research included supersonic diffusers and supersonic compressors in the early 40s, which has since been applied to jet engines. He invented the total energy variometer in 1939, used in soaring planes, and is the co-inventor of an early scheme for magnetically contained nuclear fusion, patent application, 1941. In 1950, he invented a technique for producing the supersonic source for molecular beams; this was subsequently used by chemists in research that led to two Nobel Prizes.

In the late 1950s, he returned to magnetic containment fusion, but abandoned that research in 1963, giving a paper saying he saw no way to address what he called "second order instabilities" that emerged in containment, leading to the tokamak sawtooth effect, an important negative result. This result stood for decades, though the ITER project has finally seen containment times measurable in minutes.

In the 1960s and 1970s, he led the design and development at AERL of the first intra-aortic balloon pump. The balloon pump is a temporary cardiac assist device which has been used worldwide on three million people. The device was used on his own failing heart.

Another contribution to science was the stagnation point flow experiment in which processes of initial interaction of fresh flowing blood with an artificial surface can be directly visualized under a high-power microscope. This technique has become an important method for experimentally studying this vital interaction and led to a variety of circulatory prostheses, including the artificial heart.

Kantrowitz, as an advocate of the separation of science and technology from political or ideological concerns, first proposed in 1967 the creation of an Institution for Scientific Judgment, commonly referred to as the Science Court, to assess the state of knowledge in scientific controversies of importance to public policy. He further developed the Science Court as its Task Force Chairman in President Ford's Advisory Group on Anticipated Advances in Science and Technology, 1975–1976.

According to Jerry Pournelle, "We could have developed all this [i.e. large scale commercial space development] in the 60s and 70s, but we went another path. Arthur Kantrowitz tried to convince Kennedy's people that the best way to the Moon was through development of manned space access, a von Braun manned space station, and on to the Moon in a logical way that left developed space assets."

=== Kantrowitz limit ===
Kantrowitz is known for development of a theoretical concept of fluid choke points at supersonic and near-supersonic inlet velocities. The concept has become known as the Kantrowitz limit.

==== Applications ====
The Kantrowitz limit has many applications in the gas dynamics of inlet flow for jet engines and rockets, both when operating at high-subsonic and supersonic velocities.

Two examples will explain the effect of the Kantrowitz Limit on a nozzle. For both cases, Mass flow rate = Inlet Velocity multiplied by Area multiplied by Density.

Consider a nozzle connected to a vacuum source. As the pressure ratio gets to about 2, the flow through the nozzle will approach the local speed of sound, and the flow becomes choked flow. When the absolute pressure of the vacuum is decreased further, the flow speed will not increase. This is the Kantrowitz Limit, which limits the mass flow because the velocity is limited to the speed of sound, and the area, inlet pressure and density are all fixed. Aircraft jet engines are very much affected by this limit, once the inlet flow speed gets to Mach 1 the mass flow rate is limited, regardless of how much suction the engine creates.

Next, consider the nozzle connected to a compressed air supply. With a pressure ratio of about 2, the flow becomes choked, and cannot exceed the speed of sound. But the density and resultant mass flow rate can be increased by increasing the inlet pressure. The greater the pressure, the greater the density, and the greater the mass flow. So, while Kantrowitz limits the maximum gas velocity, it does not apply any fixed limit to the mass flow rate.

A recent high-speed transportation option for rapid transit between populous city-pairs about 1,000 miles (1,600 km) apart, the Hyperloop, has the Kantrowitz limit as a fundamental design criterion. Attempting to pass a high-speed passenger-pod through a very low pressure tube runs squarely into the Kantrowitz fluid flow limit. Historically, the solutions to working within the limit have been "go fast" and "go slow". A major innovation in the Hyperloop proposal provides a novel third approach to remain below the Kantrowitz limit while still moving at high-subsonic velocities: adding a front-end inlet compressor to actively transfer high-pressure air from the front to the rear of the high-speed transport capsule, and thus bypassing much of the air that would have resulted in the dynamic shock of the choked flow. The flow in the smaller duct through the capsule is also subject to the Kantrowitz Limit, this is relieved by increasing the pressure and the density to achieve the required mass flow. In the Hyperloop alpha design of 2013, the air-inlet pump also provides a low-friction air-bearing suspension system for traveling at over 700 mph (1,100 km/h).

== Honors and awards ==
Kantrowitz was a fellow of the American Academy of Arts and Sciences, American Association for the Advancement of Science, American Astronautical Society, American Institute of Aeronautics and Astronautics (honorary), American Physical Society, American Institute for Medical and Biological Engineering and member of the National Academy of Engineering and United States National Academy of Sciences and International Academy of Astronautics. In 1953–1954, he held both Fulbright and Guggenheim Fellowships at Cambridge and Manchester Universities.

Kantrowitz was an honorary trustee of the University of Rochester, an honorary life member of the Board of Governors of The Technion, and an honorary professor of the Huazhong Institute of Technology, Wuhan, China. Kantrowitz also served on the Board of Advisors for the Foresight Institute, an organization devoted to preparing for nanotechnology.

Kantrowitz held 21 patents and wrote or co-authored more than 200 scientific and professional papers and articles. He also co-authored Fundamentals of Gas Dynamics, 1958, Princeton Univ. Press.

Kantrowitz died at age 95, November 29, 2008, while visiting relatives in New York. He had suffered a heart attack on the previous day.

Kantrowitz was the Director of the Hertz Foundation, an honorary fellow of the AIAA, and held Fulbright/Guggenheim Fellowships (1953-1954) at Cambridge and Manchester—details expanding his advisory roles to the GAO and Commerce Department https://nss.org/national-space-society-governor-arthur-kantrowitz-biography/

See also

- Hyperloop pod competition – practical ground transport vehicle prototypes dealing with the Kantrowitz limit
