= Liebherr Aerospace =

Aerospace equipment manufacturing company

Liebherr-Aerospace & Transportation
- Type: Société Anonyme
- Industry: Aerospace and Transportation Systems
- Founded: 1960; 66 years ago
- Headquarters: Toulouse
- Products: In the aerospace sector: flight control systems, landing gears, integrated air management systems, bleed air systems, wing anti ice etc. In the transportation sector: air conditioning systems, actuation and power supply systems for all kind of rail cars
- Revenue: €1.4 billion in 2019 (€1.3bn in 2016)
- Number of employees: ▲6,200 (2019)
- Website: www.liebherr.com/en/fra/products/aerospace-and-transportation-systems/aerospace/aerospace.html

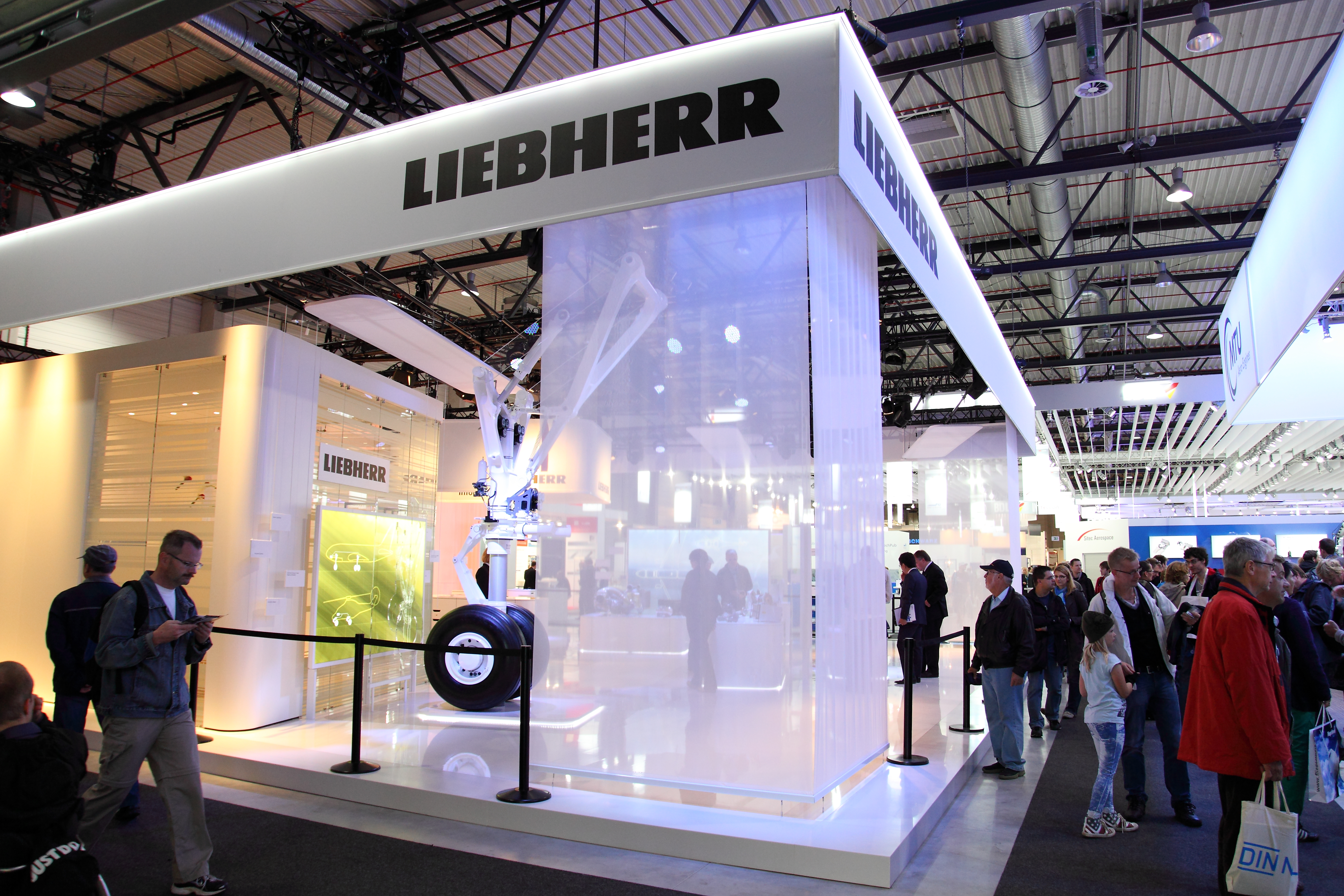
The nose landing gear for the Airbus A350. manufactured and supplied by Liebherr-Aerospace

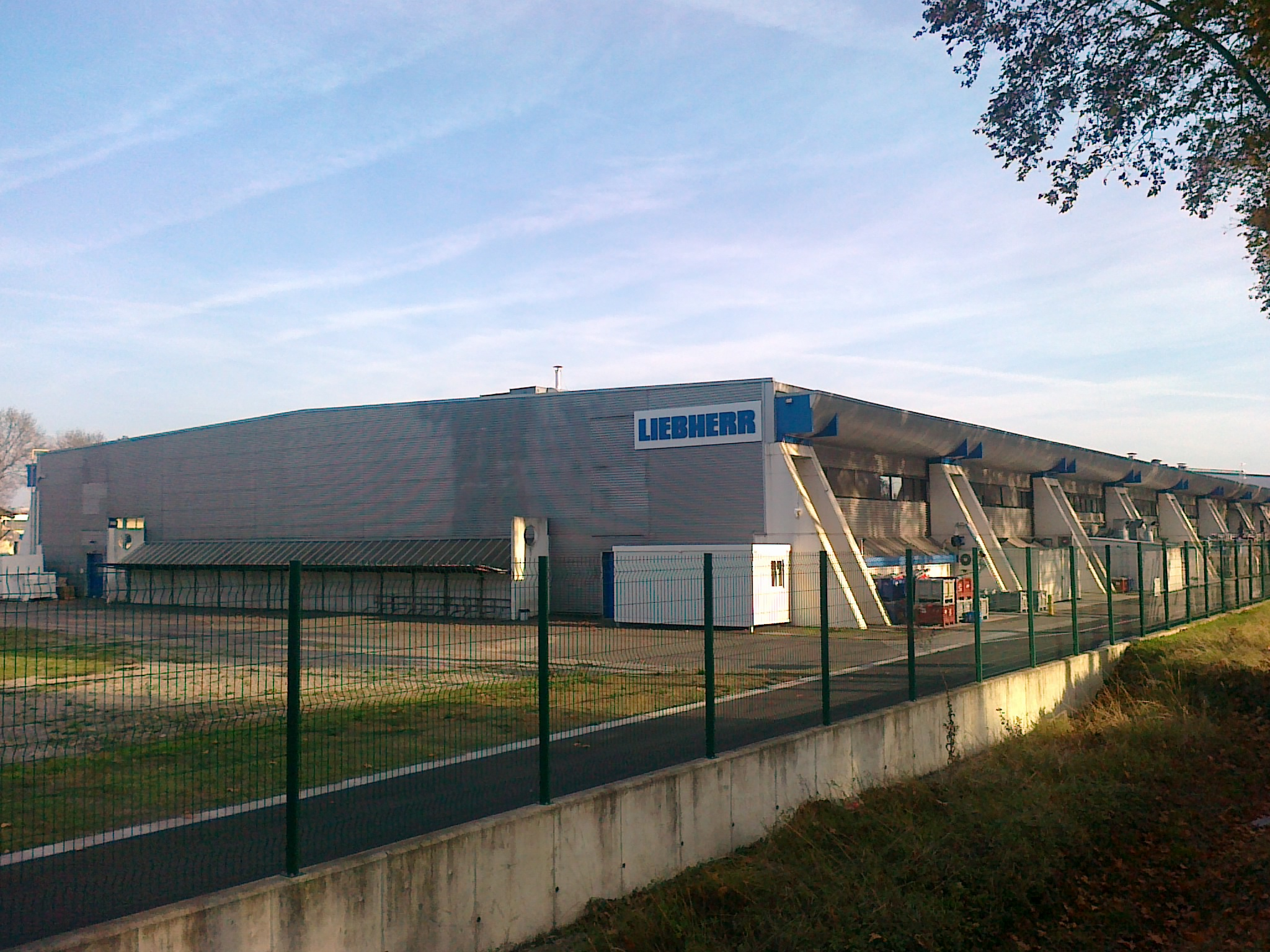
A view of the Liebherr-Aerospace Toulouse (LTS)

Liebherr-Aerospace is the aerospace equipment manufacturing division of Liebherr. The company is an original equipment manufacturer (OEM); its low visibility in the minds of end consumers can be attributed to the OEM nature of all of its operations.

Liebherr-Aerospace contributed €1.3 billion ($1.5bn) to total Liebherr group sales of €9 billion in 2016. This represented an increase of nearly 5% in turnover for the division. The division was reported to be employing around 5400 people all over the world. It has two primary production and assembly centres: Liebherr-Aerospace Toulouse and Liebherr-Aerospace Lindenberg.

Some of the other sites include: Liebherr-Aerospace Saline, Michigan, U.S., Liebherr-Aerospace Singapore, Liebherr-Aerospace Dubai, U.A.E, Liebherr-Aerospace Laval, Canada, Liebherr-Aerospace Maintenance centre, Shanghai, Liebherr-Aerospace, Bangalore, India, Liebherr-Aerospace Toulouse, Campsas site, Liebherr-Aerospace Brasil, Guaratingueta, Liebherr-Aerospace Nizhny Novgorod (Russia).

The Lindenberg and Toulouse centres of Liebherr have been recognized by the European Aviation Safety Agency (EASA) as a Design Organization Approval (DOA) certified company. This certification encompasses: landing gear systems, air management systems, and flight control actuation systems.

== Production and other activities ==
Liebherr-Aerospace supplies aircraft flight control and actuation systems, landing gear, air management systems (bleed air systems, wing anti ice, etc.), on-board electronics as well as gears and gearboxes for the aerospace industry. These systems are deployed in wide-bodied aircraft, single aisle and regional aircraft, business jets, combat aircraft, military transport aircraft, military training aircraft, civil helicopters and combat helicopters.

Being in Toulouse, Liebherr-Aerospace benefits from being in close proximity to the base of operations of one of their most important customers, Airbus.

Apart from manufacturing activities Liebherr-Aerospace also services and overhauls in-service components for their customers (Airlines etc.). It also provides training courses for mechanics, engineers and other relevant personnel who work with any Aircraft which carries Liebherr products.

=== USM – Used Serviceable Materials ===
On 16 July 2018, it was reported that Liebherr-Aerospace was expanding its services in a new direction by setting up a global network for USM parts to be managed from their Dubai offices. They plan to source own products and systems from retired aircraft, perform repairs if necessary and redistribute and sell through their network. The serviced parts will be released with appropriate airworthiness certifications and will come with a "Repaired by Liebherr" tag instead of a "New" tag. It is reported that their initial focus will be on Airbus fleets and families with a subsequent expansion. The target Customers are those with mature fleets, who will be requiring OEM quality parts at lower operation costs.

== Research and development ==
The firm was reported to have invested in 2017 about €70 million ($82m) in R&D: more than 17% of revenue.

=== B777X Wingtips ===
One of the most recent developments is the design of folding wingtips which are being implemented on the Boeing 777X. Due to its much larger wingspan the 777X could not be classified in the same category as the B777. With the folding wingtips 777X will still be in the same wingspan category as the B777. For take-off, the wing tips will be unfolded back into the horizontal position, providing the benefit of an extended span to increase fuel efficiency. The folding wing tip system is the first of its kind in commercial aviation.

=== 3D Printing and Fuel Cells ===
The firm uses 3D printing technology to manufacture some of their products. The firm has also invested in developing tools and parts of their products using titanium because of the benefits it offers. The firm is working on developing fuel cells along with their partners General Motors. Liebherr is interested in the use of fuel cells to replace APU's (auxiliary power unit) on conventional aircraft, greatly reducing emissions. GM on the other hand is aiming to develop a primary source of energy for electric cars.

=== Hyperloop ===
Liebherr-Aerospace partnered with TransPod for the research, development, and production of new cabin and vehicle thermal systems designed specifically for TransPod’s hyperloop system to ensure safety, efficiency, and passenger comfort.

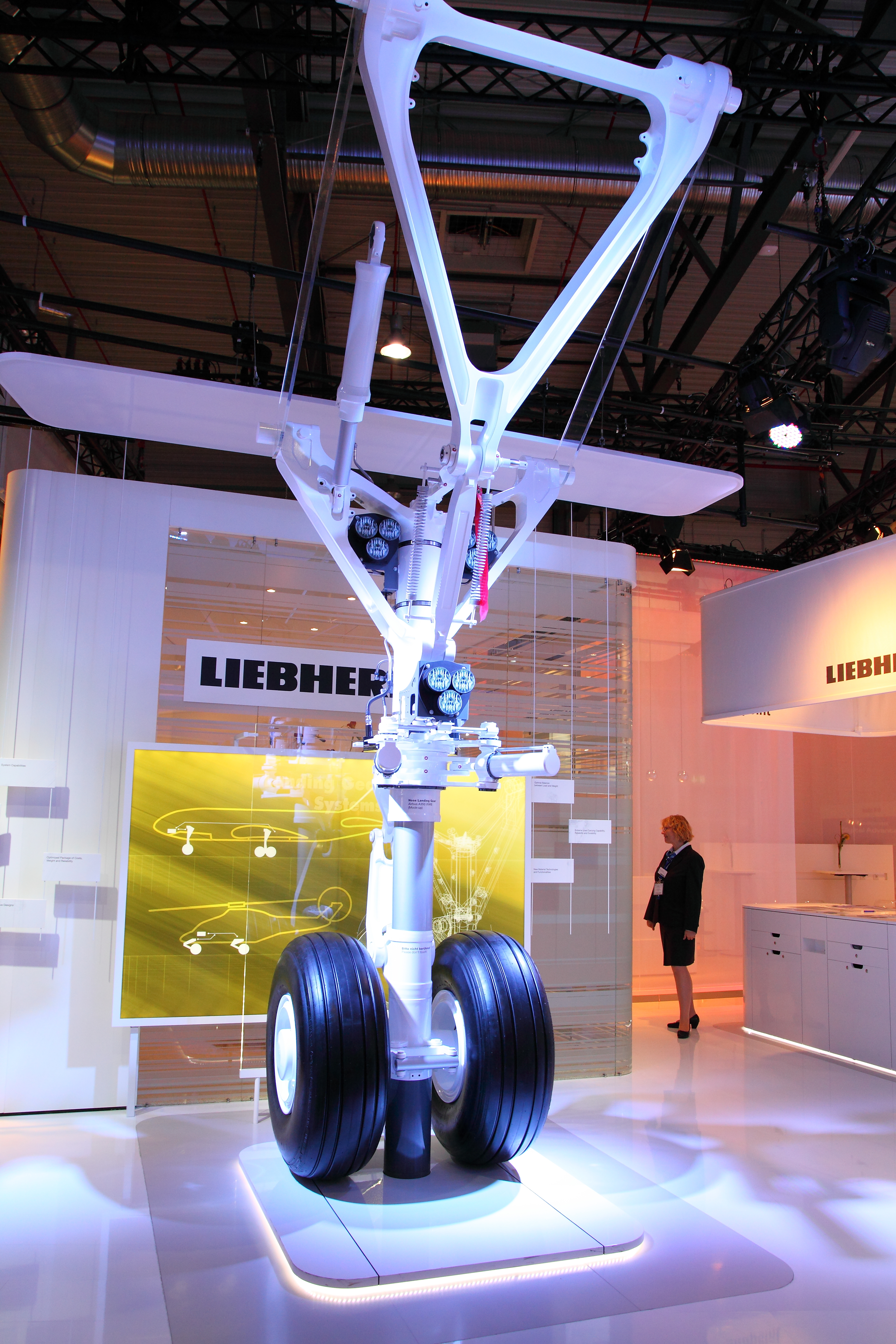
Liebherr-Aerospace at ILA Berlin Air Show; Nose Landing Gear; Airbus A350 XWB; Mock up; Liebherr-Aerospace Lindenberg im Allgäu

== Presence at recent events ==
Liebherr-Aerospace is among the exhibitors at ILA Berlin Air Show. and was present in the latest edition of the Farnborough Air Show as well.

== Incidents ==
On 18 July 2018, an explosion was reported at Liebherr-Aerospace's Toulouse site. According to news reports, a valve on a high pressure air circulation system on the shop floor failed due to undetermined reasons. According to one of the reports, the explosion of the high pressure air lines was heard kilometres away. The accident took place during work hours, around 2 PM. The pressure of the high pressure line has been reported to be around 25 Bars, which is 25 times the normal atmospheric pressure. News agencies report that 39 employees were treated on site by emergency services and the in-house medical teams. Around 12 employees who were in immediate vicinity were affected and had respiratory and hearing problems, Three of them were hospitalised at the Toulouse Purpan Hospital.

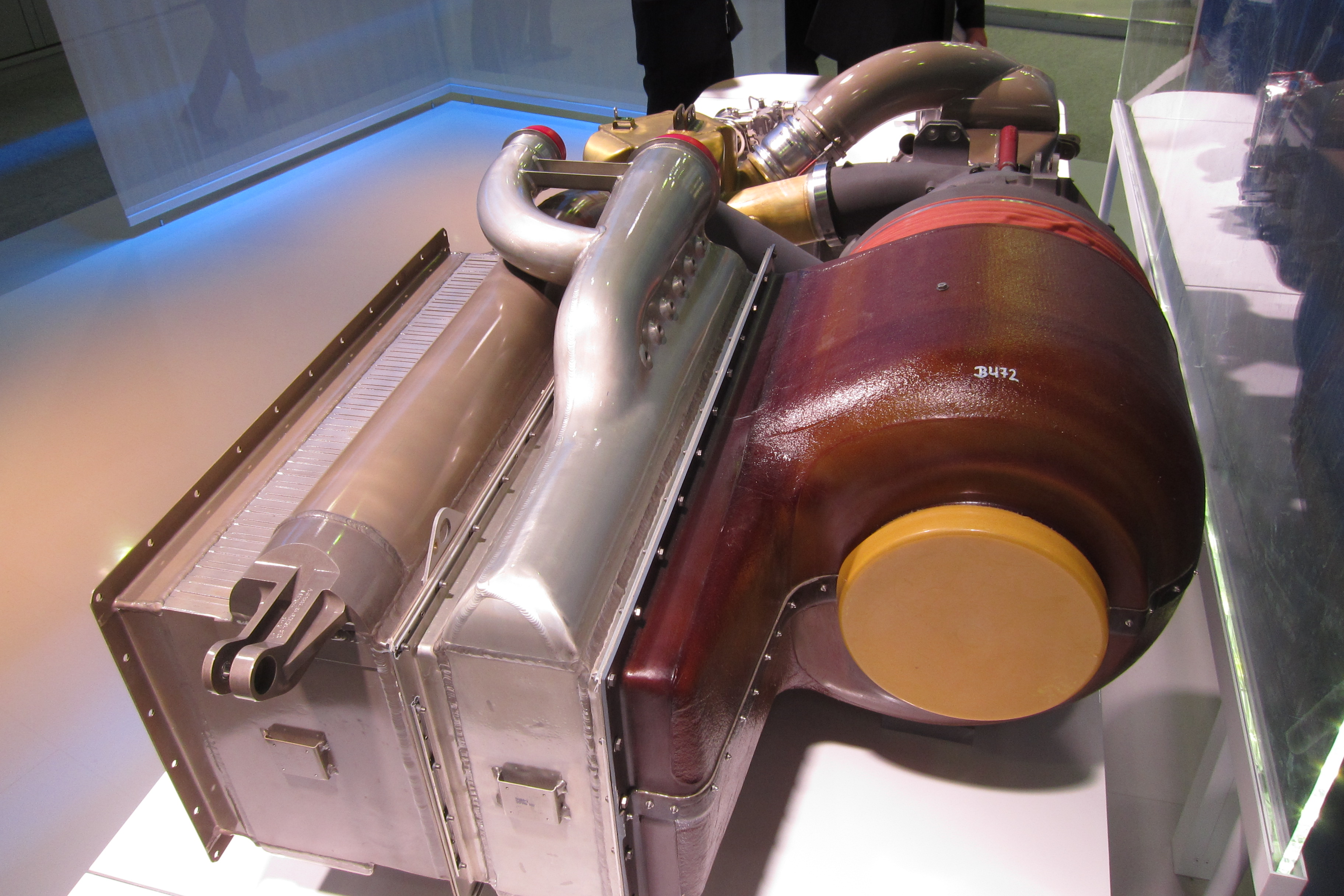
Air conditioning pack of Comac C919 by Liebherr-Aerospace at an Airshow

== Customers ==
The direct customers for Liebherr Aerospace are the air frame manufacturers as listed below, but end customers like Airlines also deal directly with Liebherr Aerospace for maintenance and troubleshooting.

- Airbus
- Airbus Helicopters
- Airbus Defense
- Bombardier
- ATR
- Embraer
- Boeing

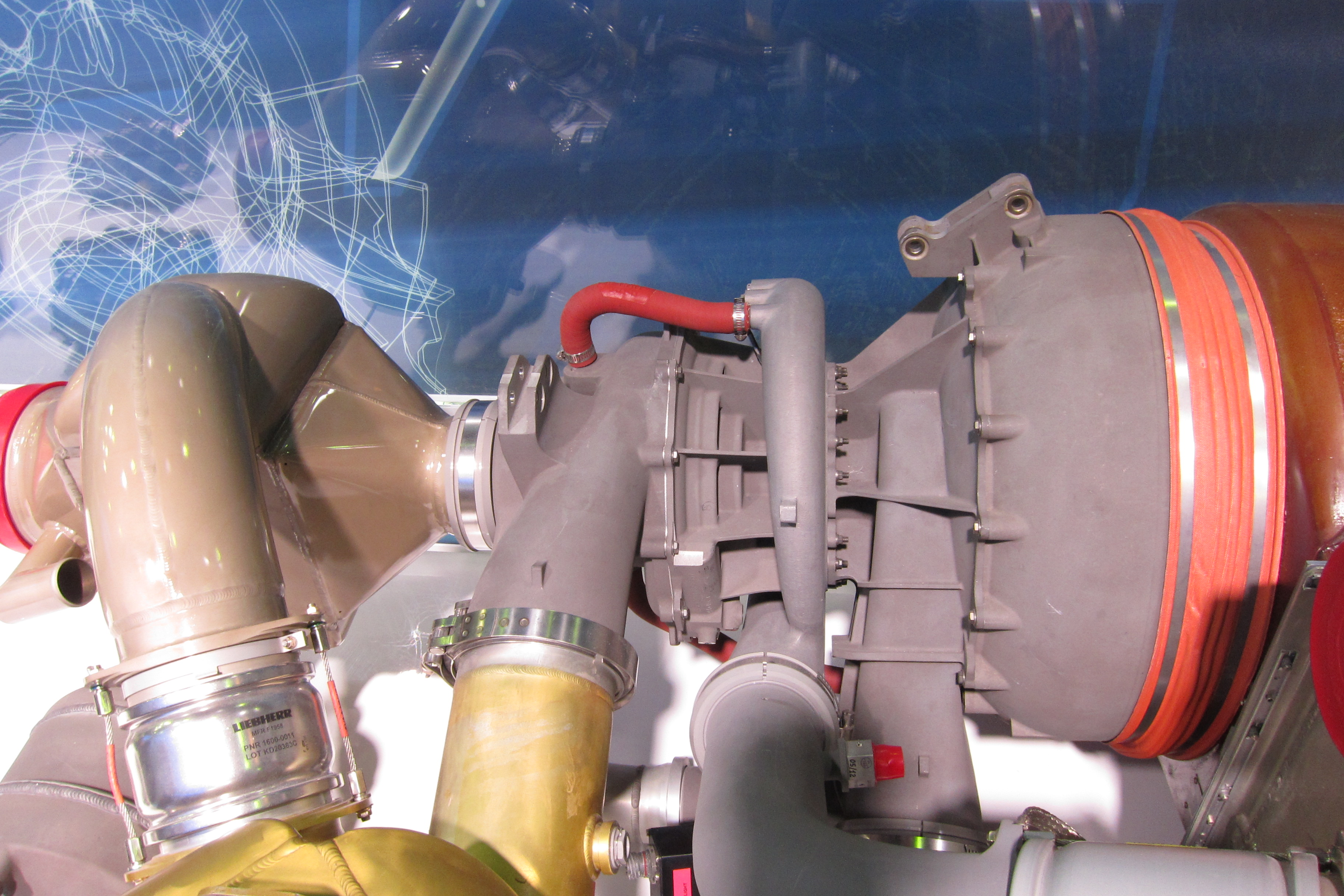
Air conditioning pack of Comac C919 by Liebherr-Aerospace

- COMAC
- Dassault Aviation
- Agusta Westland
- Irkut Corporation
- Antonov
- Sukhoi
- Rolls-Royce
