= Campsas =

- Commune
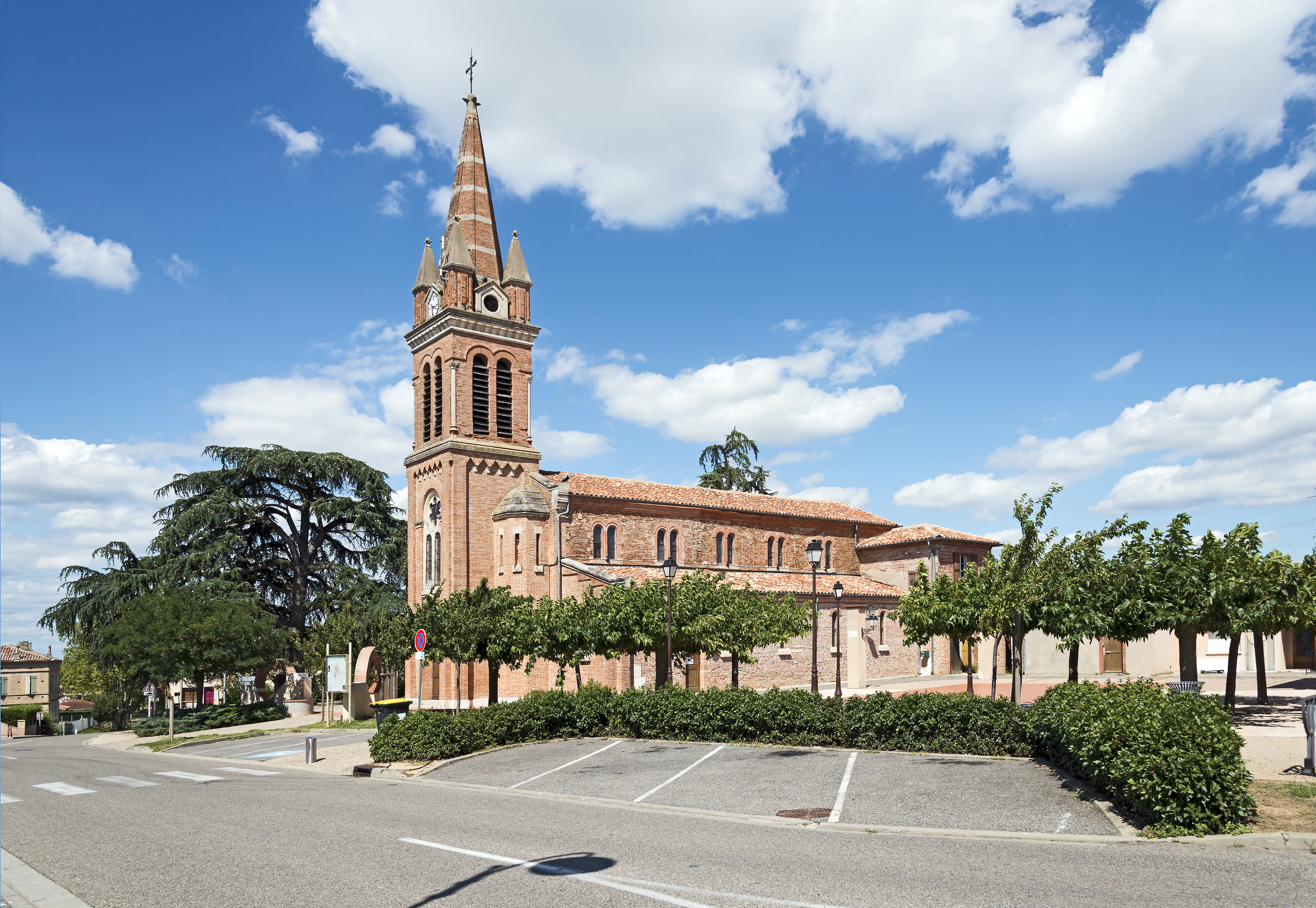
- Campsas village square

- Coat of arms
- Location of Campsas
- Location within France Location within Occitanie
- Coordinates: 43°53′53″N 1°19′38″E
- Country: France
- Region: Occitania
- Department: Tarn-et-Garonne
- Arrondissement: Montauban
- Canton: Verdun-sur-Garonne
- Intercommunality: Grand Sud Tarn et Garonne

Government
  - Mayor (2020–2026): Marie-Claude Nègre
- Area^{1}: 15.01 km^{2} (5.80 sq mi)
- Elevation: 145 m (476 ft)
- Highest elevation: 144 m (472 ft)
- Lowest elevation: 104 m (341 ft)
- Population (2023): 1,473
  - Density: 98.13/km^{2} (254.2/sq mi)
- Time zone: UTC+01:00 (CET)
  - Summer (DST): UTC+02:00 (CEST)
- INSEE/Postal code: 82027 /82370
- ^{1} French Land Register data, which excludes lakes, ponds, glaciers > 1 km^{2} (0.386 sq mi or 247 acres) and river estuaries.

Campsas is a commune in the Tarn-et-Garonne department in the Occitanie region in southern France.

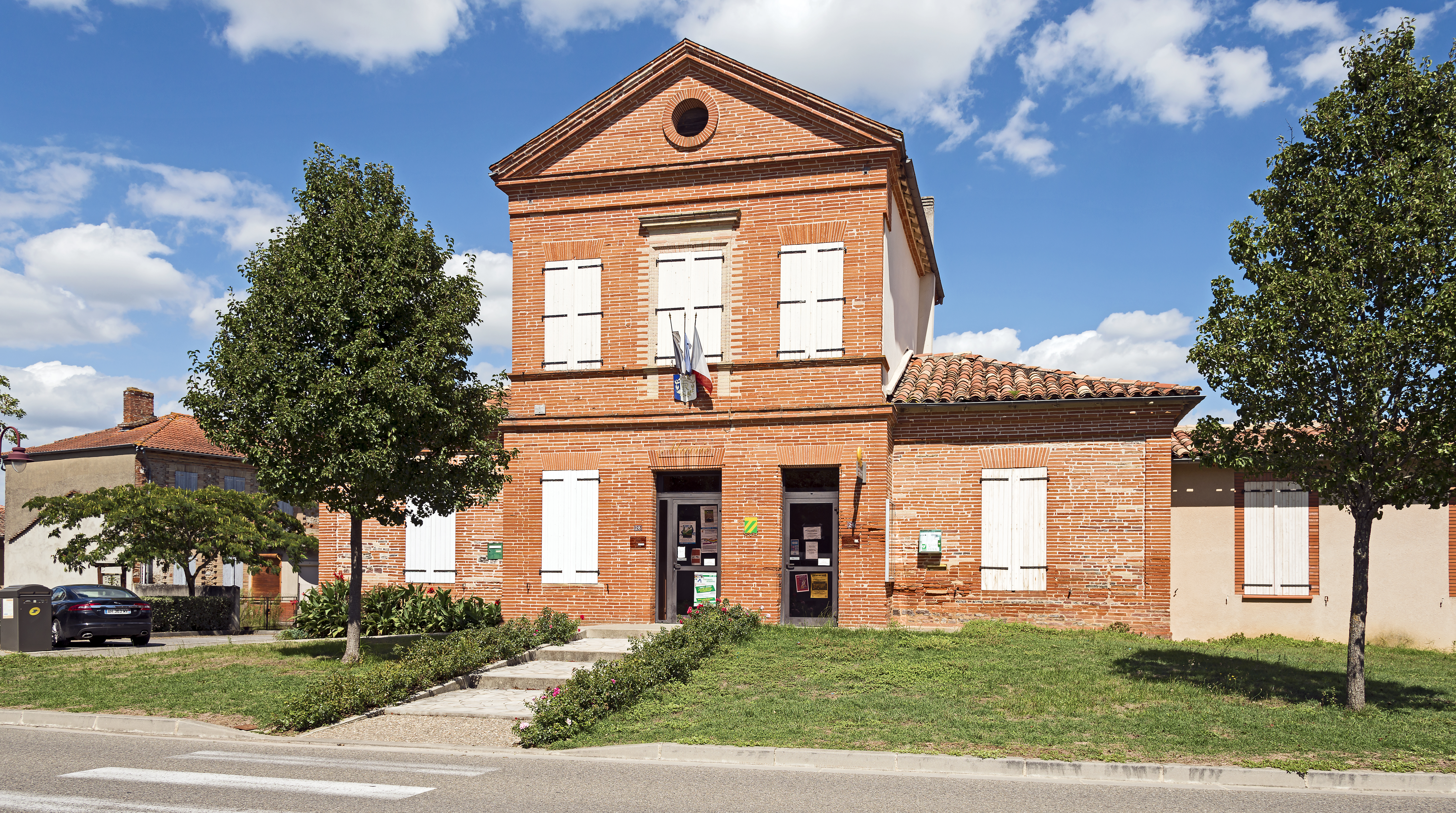
Town hall

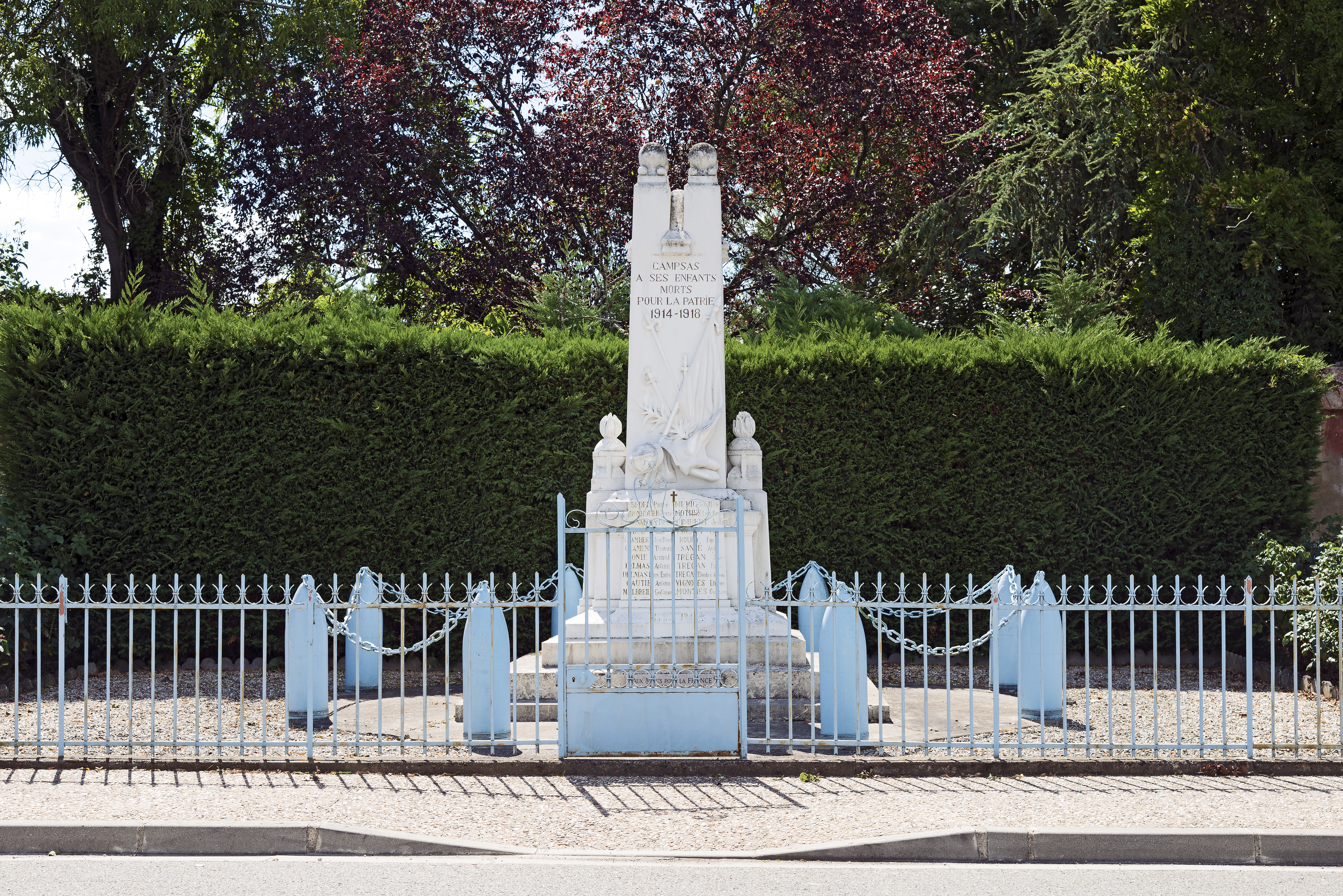
War memorial

The commune hosts a large production centre of Liebherr Aerospace.

== See also ==
- Communes of the Tarn-et-Garonne department
- Liebherr Aerospace
