= Arrivo =

Former rail startup company

Coordinates: 39.86163°N 104.74913°W

- Type: Private
- Industry: High-speed rail
- Founded: 2016
- Defunct: 2018
- Headquarters: Los Angeles, California
- Key people: Brogan BamBrogan (Founder)
- Website: www.arrivo-loop.com

Arrivo Corporation was a startup company in Los Angeles, California, that developed maglev rail. Arrivo initially attempted to commercialize a hyperloop, but abandoned the effort in November 2017 in favor of established transit technologies.

In November 2017, Arrivo proposed a plan for a 200 mph (322 km/h) maglev system in Colorado that would transport automobiles to and from Denver International Airport.

On December 14, 2018, Arrivo reportedly shut down due to being unable to secure Series A funding.

== History ==
Arrivo was founded in 2016, after an acrimonious departure of most of Arrivo's management team from Hyperloop One. A resulting lawsuit was settled. The company's trademark application described its mission as: "Financial advisory and consultancy services namely, provide expert project analysis in the field of transportation."

In a June 2017 interview, founder BamBrogan reported the company had twenty employees. Three months before it ended hyperloop development, USA Today reported Arrivo as one of three top contenders in the hyperloop field.

== Colorado maglev project ==
Arrivo agreed to lease offices in an unused toll plaza on E-470 in Commerce City, Colorado, intending to employ forty engineers. The second phase would have been the erection of a half-mile maglev test track, but not the evacuated tube that was a big part of Elon Musk's original hyperloop proposal. The state has offered $760,000 in tax incentives to lure Arrivo. At a press conference, Brogan BamBrogan described a system that would move automobiles from downtown Denver to the airport at the same price as the tolls on Pena Boulevard, the airport highway. It would, he said, have a payback period of ten years. The company planned to break ground on the first commercial leg, from Aurora to the airport, in 2019, with an opening in 2021.

== Technology ==
The company has described a sled for automobiles; other elements of the technology with the exception of the tube and vacuum are likely to be similar to maglev.

In March 2017 the company claimed it could have an operational hyperloop within three years.

In November 2017, the company announced that it was no longer developing vacuum tubes and was focused on maglev rail technology.

== Funding ==
In 2017, Arrivo said it had "'initial funding in place,' but did not reveal how much capital it had secured or the source of financial support." BamBrogan expected revenue-generating projects within three years, with a "classic infrastructure model". In July 2018, it announced that it had received $1 billion credit from Genertec America.

== Management ==
The lead founder of Arrivo is Brogan BamBrogan, formerly founder and chief engineer at Hyperloop One and SpaceX.
