= TransPod =

Canadian-French company

- Type: Private
- Industry: High-speed rail Clean technology
- Founded: 2015; 11 years ago
- Founders: Sebastien Gendron (CEO); Ryan Janzen (Inventor, CTO)
- Headquarters: Toronto, Ontario, Canada
- Website: transpod.com

TransPod Inc. is a Canadian company designing ultra-high-speed transportation technology and vehicles.

TransPod vehicles are being designed to travel at over 1,000 kilometres per hour (620 mph) between cities, using fully electric propulsion to carry passengers and cargo. The proposed system would create a faster and carbon-free alternative to jets and automobiles if it was powered with electricity from carbon-free sources. The TransPod vehicles, which TransPod calls "FluxJets", are designed to travel through a tube guideway which is similar to a hyperloop or vactrain system, with variations based on magnetic levitation rather than air bearings to promote vehicle stability, and placing the core magnetic levitation technology on the vehicle rather than the infrastructure in an effort to minimize infrastructure costs.

In November 2016, TransPod raised a US$15 million seed round from Angelo Investments, an Italian high-tech holding group specializing in advanced technologies for the railway, space, and aviation industries. It has since expanded from Toronto, Canada, to open offices in Limoges, France and Dubai, United Arab Emirates.

In September 2017, TransPod's Chief Technology Officer Ryan Janzen revealed part of the technology in a paper published in the journal Procedia Engineering. The paper was presented at the EASD EURODYN 2017 conference, and introduces basic design elements of the TransPod system.

In March 2022, TransPod achieved an agreement in principle for US$550 million in funding for its proposed Calgary to Edmonton Ultra-High-Speed Tube Transportation system in Alberta, Canada. The financing is being provided by Broughton Capital Group, in cooperation with China-East Resources Import & Export Co. Full construction of the line was expected to begin in 2027.

In July 2022, TransPod unveiled its new vehicle and infrastructure design, termed the "FluxJet", alongside a one-third scale vehicle prototype, at a live event in Toronto.

== Technology ==
The TransPod system is being developed to carry vehicles at speeds greater than 1000 km/h. Announced in 2016, the TransPod system contains aerodynamic and propulsion systems to reduce friction compared to trains, automobiles and jets, and to therefore travel at a faster speed. TransPod's technology is designed to be compatible with renewable energies including solar generation, supplemented by regional electrical grid connection link-ups. TransPod states the purpose of this is for reduced carbon emissions.

For propulsion, TransPod vehicles use electrically driven linear induction motor technology, with active real-time control and sense-space systems.

The TransPod system is distinct from the hyperloop concept proposed by Elon Musk's Hyperloop Alpha white paper. (Note: Elon Musk's Hyperloop Alpha white paper) Unlike hyperloop, the TransPod system uses moving electromagnetic fields to propel the vehicles with stable levitation from the top surface, rather than compressed air below the vehicle.

Passenger vehicles include seating for 54 people, while cargo vehicles have a loadable interior. Each vehicle includes an aircraft-like fuselage pressurized for atmospheric air circulation and control – and includes propulsion, guidance and control systems to operate at speeds exceeding 1000 km/h within a protected tube guideway. The tubes are twinned to permit bidirectional vehicle travel.

The cargo transport TransPod vehicles are designed to carry payloads of 10 tons and have compatibility with wooden pallets, as well as various unit load devices such as LD3 containers, and AAA containers.

At high speed, the vehicle's dynamic forces are controlled by an internal guidance system, which TransPod calls Veillance Flux. Deviations of the vehicle's trajectory are sensed and tracked by a combination of inertial sensors and optical sensors. TransPod's systems use sense-space processing and real-time computer vision algorithms.

At the InnoTrans Rail Show 2016 in Berlin, TransPod premiered their vehicle concept, alongside implementation of Coelux technology – an artificial skylight to emulate natural sunlight within the passenger pods. Thereafter, in July 2022, TransPod unveiled its first functional prototype, a one-third scale vehicle, at a TransPod-organized event in Toronto. At the same event, a new system design was unveiled, which included some significant modifications from the original design - including the removal of the axial compressor from the vehicle.

== Test track in France ==
In January 2017 TransPod announced plans for a test track to be constructed in the village of Droux near Limoges in collaboration with the French department of Haute-Vienne. The proposed test track would exceed 3 km in length, and operate as a half-scale system 2m in diameter. In February 2018, Vincent Leonie, vice president of Limoges Métropole and a deputy mayor of Limoges, announced that agreements for the "Hyperloop Limoges" organization have been signed to promote and accelerate the technology.

== Technology Demonstrator Unveiling ==
In July 2022, TransPod organized an event to unveil its first ever functional prototype, a one-third scale vehicle operating in an open tube-like structure. During the event, Chief Technology Officer Ryan Janzen explained the key concepts behind the TransPod system, including its contactless plasma-based power transmission system, its propulsion and levitation systems, and its "veillance flux" guidance system, while they were shown in real-time in a series of demonstrations.

== Organization ==
=== Funding and partnerships ===
In November 2016, TransPod secured US$15 million in seed funding from Angelo Investments.

TransPod's Toronto office is located on Dufferin Street, in the Liberty Village community. TransPod's French office in Limoges, near the location of its half-scale test track site in Droux. TransPod's Dubai office is located downtown, in the Burj Khalifa district.

TransPod is additionally partnered with IKOS, an engineering firm based in Paris, and REC Architecture, centered in the Toulouse area.

In June 2017, TransPod announced a partnership with Liebherr-Aerospace to support the research, development, and production of new cabin and vehicle thermal systems.

TransPod signed a Memorandum of Understanding with the Government of Alberta in August 2020 to identify land for a test track and study the feasibility and projected effects of a Calgary-Edmonton TransPod system.

Since signing the MOU with the Government of Alberta, TransPod has received significant support from the Building Trades of Alberta, the local group representing Alberta's union workers.

In March 2022, TransPod announced that it had reached an agreement (in principle) with Broughton Capital Group for US$550 million in funding, in collaboration with China-East Resources Import Export Company, for the construction of the first phase of its Calgary to Edmonton project.

=== Governance ===
Sebastien Gendron is the CEO and co-founder of TransPod.

Ryan Janzen is the CTO and co-founder of TransPod.

== Planned routes ==
TransPod has plans to develop routes worldwide, and is designing line configurations between international cities. For example, in Canada, TransPod lines are being designed for Toronto-Montreal, Toronto-Windsor, and Toronto-Waterloo corridors in Ontario and Quebec, as well as the Calgary-Edmonton corridor in Alberta, Canada. TransPod is preparing to build a test track for the system in Canada. This track will be extendable as part of a full route pending a combination of private and public funding to construct the line.

In parallel, TransPod is designing line configurations for routes elsewhere in North America, Europe, Middle East, Asia, and Oceania.

=== Calgary–Edmonton Corridor ===
TransPod signed a Memorandum of understanding with the Government of Alberta in August 2020 to identify land for a test track and to study the feasibility and projected effects of a Calgary-Edmonton hyperloop. The corridor is predicted to have a potential speed of 1000 km/h and a travel time of 45 minutes. The study was released June 2021 and claims the TransPod system would reduce carbon emissions by 636,000 tonnes per year, would create more than 15,500 jobs per year during construction, and would add $19.2 billion to Alberta's GDP. The study also estimates a cost of $45.1 million per kilometer and $6.7 billion for "fixed infrastructure-like stations." The total cost is forecasted to be $22.4 billion. TransPod believes that construction of the test track, followed by the testing phase, will be completed from 2024 to 2028 and the construction of the full Calgary-Edmonton Corridor to begin in 2028.

On March 29, 2022, TransPod announced it has reached an agreement in principle for US$550 million financing from Broughton Capital Group in cooperation with China-East Resources Import & Export Co. for its Calgary to Edmonton Ultra-High-Speed Tube Transportation system.

=== Toronto–Windsor Corridor ===
In July 2017, TransPod released an initial cost study which outlines the viability of building a TransPod line in Southwestern Ontario between the cities of Windsor and Toronto. The Government of Ontario announced an environmental assessment for a high-speed-rail line along this route in May 2017 for the same corridor. The study indicates a TransPod tube system would cost half the projected cost of a high-speed rail line along the same route, while operating at more than four times the top speed of high-speed rail.

=== Marseille-Nice Corridor ===
In October 2019, TransPod released a pre-feasibility study which outlines the viability of building a TransPod line in the south of France between the cities of Nice and Marseille. The study only evaluates passenger transport (ignoring cargo), concluding that a passenger-only line would not be financially feasible but indicating that a passenger-and-cargo line may be feasible in the region and merits further study.

=== Thailand Corridor ===
In March 2019, TransPod released a pre-feasibility study which outlines the viability of building a TransPod line across Thailand, between the cities of Chiang Mai, Bangkok, and Phuket. The study only evaluates passenger transport (ignoring cargo), concluding that a passenger-only line would not be financially feasible but indicating that a passenger-and-cargo line may be feasible in the region and merits further study.
