= Kantrowitz limit =

In gas dynamics, the Kantrowitz limit refers to a theoretical concept describing choked flow at supersonic or near-supersonic velocities. When an initially subsonic fluid flow experiences a reduction in cross-section area, the flow speeds up in order to maintain the same mass-flow rate, per the continuity equation. If a near supersonic flow experiences an area contraction, the velocity of the flow will decrease until it reaches the local speed of sound, and the flow will be choked. This is the principle behind the Kantrowitz limit: it is the maximum amount of contraction a flow can experience before the flow chokes, and the flow speed can no longer be increased above this limit, independent of changes in upstream or downstream pressure.

== Derivation of Kantrowitz limit ==
Assume a fluid enters an internally contracting nozzle at cross-section 0, and passes through a throat of smaller area at cross-section 4. A normal shock is assumed to start at the beginning of the nozzle contraction, and this point in the nozzle is referred to as cross-section 2. Due to conservation of mass within the nozzle, the mass flow rate at each cross section must be equal:

$$\dot m_0 = \dot m_2 = \dot m_4$$

For an ideal compressible gas, the mass flow rate at each cross-section can be written as,

$$\dot m_0 = \sqrt{\frac{\gamma}{R}} M_0\left(1 + \frac{\gamma -1}{2} M_0^2\right) ^{-\frac{\gamma+1}{2(\gamma - 1)}} \frac{p_{t0}A_0}{\sqrt{T_{t0}}}$$
$$\dot m_4 = \sqrt{\frac{\gamma}{R}} M_4\left(1 + \frac{\gamma -1}{2} M_4^2\right) ^{-\frac{\gamma+1}{2(\gamma - 1)}} \frac{p_{t4}A_4}{\sqrt{T_{t4}}}$$

where $A$ is the cross-section area at the specified point, $\gamma$ is the Isentropic expansion factor of the gas, $M$ is the Mach number of the flow at the specified cross-section, $R$ is the ideal gas constant, $p_t$ is the stagnation pressure, and $T_t$ is the stagnation temperature.

Setting the mass flow rates equal at the inlet and throat, and recognizing that the total temperature, ratio of specific heats, and gas constant are constant, the conservation of mass simplifies to,

$$M_0\left(1 + \frac{\gamma -1}{2} M_0^2\right) ^{-\frac{\gamma+1}{2(\gamma - 1)}} p_{t0}A_0 = M_4\left(1 + \frac{\gamma -1}{2} M_4^2\right) ^{-\frac{\gamma+1}{2(\gamma - 1)}} p_{t4}A_4$$

Solving for A_{4}/A_{0},

$$\frac{A_4}{A_0} = \frac{M_0}{M_4} \frac{p_{t0}}{p_{t4}} \left(\frac{1 + \frac{\gamma - 1}{2} M_0^2}{1 + \frac{\gamma - 1}{2} M_4^2}\right) ^{-\frac{\gamma+1}{2(\gamma -1)}}$$

Three assumptions will be made: the flow from behind the normal shock in the inlet is isentropic, or p_{t4} = p_{t2} , the flow at the throat (point 4) is sonic such that M_{4} = 1, and the pressures between the various point are related through normal shock relations, resulting in the following relation between inlet and throat pressures,

$$\frac{p_{t0}}{p_{t4}} = \left[ \frac{(\gamma + 1)M_0^2}{(\gamma - 1)M_0^2 +2}\right] ^{\frac{-\gamma}{\gamma-1}} \left[\frac{\gamma+1}{2\gamma M_0^2 - (\gamma - 1)} \right] ^{\frac{-1}{\gamma-1}}$$

And since M_{4} = 1, shock relations at the throat simplify to,

$$M_4\left(1 + \frac{\gamma -1}{2} M_4^2\right) ^{-\frac{\gamma+1}{2(\gamma - 1)}} = \left( \frac{\gamma + 1}{2} \right)^{-\frac{\gamma + 1}{2(\gamma - 1)}}$$

Substituting for $M_4$ and $\frac{p_{t0}}{p_{t4}}$ in the area ratio expression gives,

$$\frac{A_4}{A_0} = M_0 \left(\frac{1 + \frac{\gamma - 1}{2} M_0^2}{\frac{\gamma + 1}{2}}\right)^{-\frac{\gamma + 1}{2(\gamma - 1)}}\left[ \frac{(\gamma + 1)M_0^2}{(\gamma - 1)M_0^2 +2}\right] ^{\frac{-\gamma}{\gamma-1}} \left[\frac{\gamma+1}{2\gamma M_0^2 - (\gamma - 1)} \right] ^{\frac{-1}{\gamma-1}}$$

This can also be written as,

$$\frac{A_4}{A_0} = M_0\left(\frac{\gamma + 1}{2 + (\gamma - 1) M_0^2}\right)^{\frac{\gamma + 1}{2(\gamma - 1)}}\left[ \frac{(\gamma + 1)M_0^2}{(\gamma - 1)M_0^2 +2}\right] ^{\frac{-\gamma}{\gamma-1}}\left[\frac{\gamma+1}{2\gamma M_0^2 - (\gamma - 1)} \right] ^{\frac{-1}{\gamma-1}}$$

== Applications ==
The Kantrowitz limit has many applications in gas dynamics of inlet flow, including jet engines and rockets operating at high-subsonic and supersonic velocities, and high-speed transportation systems such as the Hyperloop.

=== Hypersonic Engine Inlets ===
The Kantrowitz limit demonstrates the amount of contraction, or change in two-dimensional cross-section area, that a hypersonic inlet can employ while successfully starting an engine inlet (or avoiding the expelling of the hypersonic inlet shock wave).

=== Hyperloop ===
The Kantrowitz limit is a fundamental concept in the Hyperloop, a proposed high-speed transportation system. The Hyperloop claims to move passengers, when and if built, in sealed pods through a partial-vacuum tube at high-subsonic speeds. As the air in the tube moves into and around the smaller cross-sectional area between the pod and tube, the air flow must speed up due to the continuity principle. If the pod is travelling through the tube fast enough, the air flow around the pod would reach the speed of sound, and the flow would become choked, resulting in large air resistance on the pod. The condition that determines if the flow around the pod chokes is the Kantrowitz limit. The Kantrowitz limit therefore acts a "speed limit" - for a given ratio of tube area and pod area, there is a maximum speed that the pod can travel before flow around the pod chokes and air resistance sharply increases.

In order to break through the speed limit set by the Kantrowitz limit, there are two possible approaches. The first would increase the diameter of the tube in order to provide more bypass area for the air around the pod, preventing the flow from choking. This solution is not very practical in practice however, as the tube would have to be built very large, and logistical costs of such a large tube are impractical.

As an alternative, it has been found during the main study of the Swissmetro project (1993 -1998) that a turbine can be installed on board of the vehicle to push the displaced air across the vehicle body (TurboSwissMetro) and hence to reduce far field impacts. This would avoid the continuous increase of the vehicle drag due to the choking of the flow at the cost of the power required to drive the turbine and hence enable larger speeds. The computer program NUMSTA has been developed in this context; it allows to simulate the dynamical interaction of several high speed vehicles in complex tunnel networks including the choking effect.

This idea has also been proposed by Elon Musk in his 2013 Hyperloop Alpha paper where a compressor is placed at the front of the pod. The compressor actively draws in air from the front of the pod and transfers it to the rear, bypassing the gap between pod and tube while diverting a fraction of the flow to power a low-friction air-bearing suspension system. The inclusion of a compressor in the Hyperloop pod circumvents the Kantrowitz limit, allowing the pod to travel at speeds over 700 mph (about 1126 km/h) in a relatively narrow tube.

For a pod travelling through a tube, the Kantrowitz limit is given as the ratio of tube area to bypass area both around the outside of the pod and through any air-bypass compressor:

$$\frac{A_{bypass}}{A_{tube}} = \left [\frac{\gamma - 1}{\gamma + 1} \right]^\frac{1}{2} \left [\frac{2\gamma}{\gamma + 1} \right]^\frac{1}{\gamma - 1} \left [1 + \frac{2}{\gamma - 1}\frac{1}{M^2} \right]^\frac{1}{2} \left [1- \frac{\gamma - 1}{2\gamma}\frac{1}{M^2} \right]^\frac{1}{\gamma - 1}$$

where:
$A_{bypass}$	= cross-sectional area of bypass region between tube and pod, as well as air bypass provide by a compressor on board the pod
$A_{tube}$	= cross-sectional area of tube
$M$	= Mach number of flow
$\gamma$	= $\frac{c_p}{c_v}$ = isentropic expansion factor
($c_p$ and $c_v$ are specific heats of the gas at constant pressure and constant volume respectively)

== See also ==
- Arthur Kantrowitz
