= Hyperloop =

Proposed mode of passenger and freight transportation

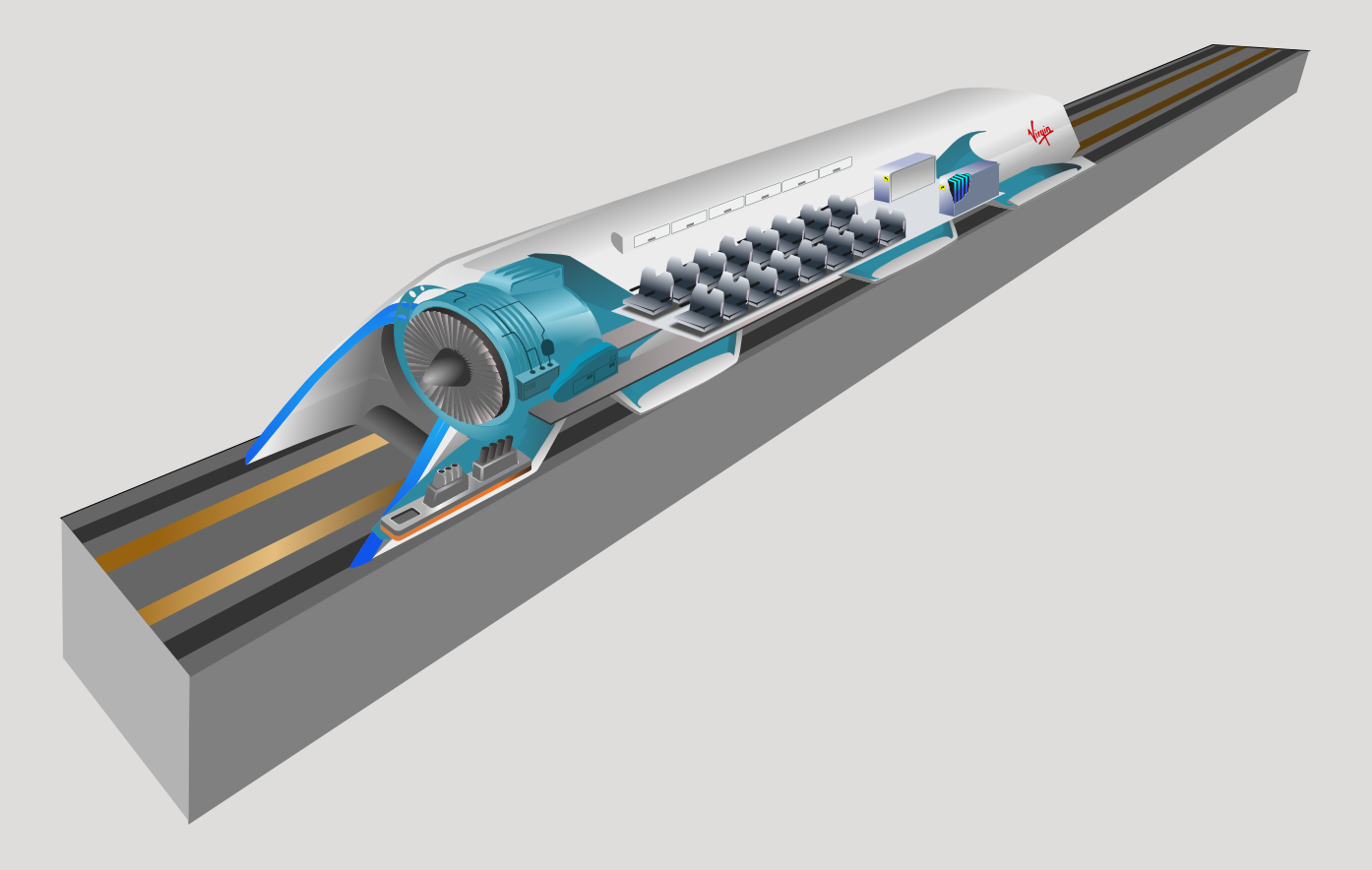
Concept art of hyperloop inner workings

Hyperloop is a proposed high-speed transportation system for both passengers and freight. In 2013, the concept was published by industrialist Elon Musk in a white paper, where the hyperloop was described as a transportation system using capsules supported by an air-bearing surface within a low-pressure tube. Hyperloop systems have three essential elements: tubes, pods, and terminals. The tube is a large, sealed, low-pressure system (typically a long tunnel). The pod is a coach at atmospheric pressure that experiences low air resistance or friction inside the tube using magnetic propulsion (in the initial design, augmented by a ducted fan). The terminal handles pod arrivals and departures. The hyperloop, in the form proposed by Musk, differs from other vactrains by relying on residual air pressure inside the tube to provide lift from aerofoils and propulsion by fans; however, many subsequent variants using the name "hyperloop" have remained relatively close to the core principles of vactrains.

Hyperloop was teased by Elon Musk at a 2012 speaking event, and described as a "fifth mode of transport". Musk released details of an alpha version in a white paper on 12 August 2013, in which the hyperloop Genesis design incorporated reduced-pressure tubes with pressurized capsules riding on air bearings driven by linear induction motors and axial compressors. The white paper showed an example hyperloop route running from the Los Angeles region to the San Francisco Bay Area, roughly following the Interstate 5 corridor. Some transportation analysts challenged the cost estimates in the white paper, with some predicting that a hyperloop would run several billion dollars higher.

The hyperloop concept has been promoted by Musk and SpaceX, and other companies or organizations were encouraged to collaborate in developing the technology. A Technical University of Munich hyperloop set a speed record of 463 km/h (288 mph) in July 2019 at the pod design competition hosted by SpaceX in Hawthorne, California. Virgin Hyperloop conducted the first human trial in November 2020 at its test site in Las Vegas, reaching a top speed of 172 km/h (107 mph).

In 2023, a new European effort to standardize "hyperloop systems" released a draft standard.

Hyperloop One (formerly Virgin Hyperloop) declared bankruptcy and ceased operations on 31 December 2023. In 2026, two of the remaining prominent European developers, Hardt Hyperloop (Netherlands) and Zeleros (Spain), also became insolvent. No commercial hyperloop passenger system is in operation anywhere in the world.

== History ==
Musk first mentioned that he was thinking about a concept for a "fifth mode of transport", calling it the Hyperloop, in July 2012 at a Pando Daily event in Santa Monica, California. This hypothetical high-speed mode of transportation would have the following characteristics: immunity to weather, collision free, twice the speed of a plane, low power consumption, and energy storage for 24-hour operations. The name Hyperloop was chosen because it would go in a loop. In May 2013, Musk likened Hyperloop to a "cross between a Concorde and a railgun and an air hockey table". By 2016, Musk envisioned that more advanced versions could potentially be able to go at hypersonic speed.

From late 2012 until August 2013, a group of engineers from both Tesla and SpaceX worked on the modeling of Musk's Hyperloop concept. An early system conceptual model was published on both the Tesla and SpaceX websites which describes one potential design, function, pathway, and cost of a hyperloop system. In the alpha design, pods were envisioned to accelerate to cruising speeds gradually using linear electric motors and glide above their track on air bearings through tubes above ground on columns or below ground in tunnels to avoid the challenges of grade crossings. An ideal hyperloop system was estimated to be more energy-efficient, quiet, and autonomous than existing modes of mass transit in the 2010s. The Hyperloop Alpha was released as an open source design. Musk invited feedback to "see if the people can find ways to improve it". The trademark "HYPERLOOP", applicable to "high-speed transportation of goods in tubes" was issued to SpaceX on 4 April 2017 and later assigned to The Boring Company.

On 15 June 2015, SpaceX announced that it would build a 1-mile-long (1.6 km) Hyperloop test track located next to SpaceX's Hawthorne facility. The track was completed and used to test pod designs supplied by third parties in the competition.

By 30 November 2015, with several commercial companies and dozens of student teams pursuing the development of Hyperloop technologies, the Wall Street Journal asserted that "'The Hyperloop Movement', as some of its unaffiliated members refer to themselves, is officially bigger than the man who started it."

The Massachusetts Institute of Technology (MIT) hyperloop team developed an early hyperloop pod prototype, which they unveiled at the MIT Museum on 13 May 2016. Their design used electrodynamic suspension for levitating and eddy current braking.

An early passenger test of low-speed hyperloop technology was conducted by Virgin Hyperloop by two employees of the company in November 2020, where the unit reached a maximum speed of 172 km/h (107 mph).

In January 2023, the European Committee for Electrotechnical Standardization released a draft standard for hyperloop systems. Hardt Hyperloop demonstrated a Hyperloop lane switch without moving components in the infrastructure in June 2019 at its test site in Delft, The Netherlands.

As of 31 December 2023, Hyperloop One, the former, rebranded Virgin Hyperloop, has terminated operations. In March 2026, Hardt Hyperloop was declared insolvent by a court in The Hague after failing to secure further EU funding; its fastest manned test had reached 85 km/h. Later the same month, Zeleros filed for insolvency in Spain. Together with the earlier collapse of Hyperloop One and the effective end of HyperloopTT operations, the major commercial hyperloop efforts had largely ceased by late 2026, with no passenger system in commercial service.

== Theory and operation ==
An artist's rendition of a Hyperloop capsule: axial compressor on the front, passenger compartment in the middle, battery compartment at the rear, and air caster skis at the bottom

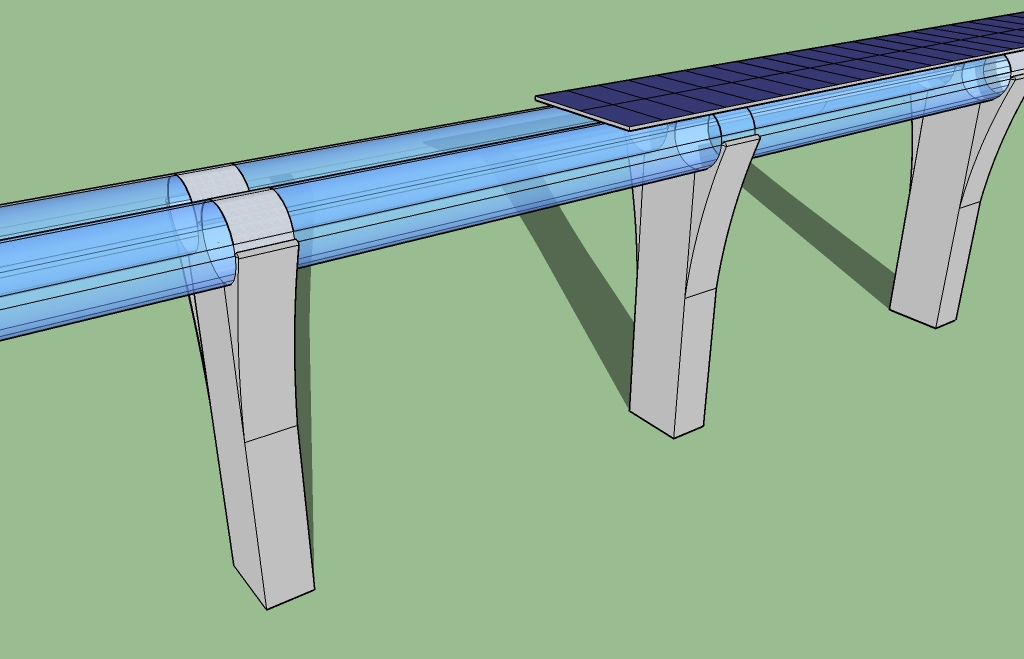
A 3D sketch of potential Hyperloop infrastructure. The steel tubes are rendered transparent in this image.

The much-older vactrain concept resembles a high-speed rail system without substantial air resistance by employing magnetically levitating trains in evacuated (airless) or partly evacuated tubes. However, the difficulty of maintaining a vacuum over large distances has prevented this type of system from ever being built. By contrast, the Hyperloop alpha concept was to operate at approximately one millibar (100 Pa) of pressure and requires the air for levitation.

=== Initial design concept ===
The hyperloop alpha concept envisioned operation by sending specially designed "capsules" or "pods" through a steel tube maintained at a partial vacuum. In Musk's original concept, each capsule would float on a 0.02–0.05 in (0.5–1.3 mm) layer of air provided under pressure to air-caster "skis", similar to how pucks are levitated above an air hockey table, while still allowing higher speeds than wheels can sustain. With rolling resistance eliminated and air resistance greatly reduced, the capsules can glide for the bulk of the journey. In the alpha design concept, an electrically driven inlet fan and axial compressor would be placed at the nose of the capsule to "actively transfer high-pressure air from the front to the rear of the vessel", resolving the problem of air pressure building in front of the vehicle, slowing it down. A fraction of the air was to be shunted to the skis for additional pressure, augmenting that gain passively from lift due to their shape.

In the alpha-level concept, passenger-only pods were to be 7 ft 4 in (2.23 m) in diameter and were projected to reach a top speed of 760 mph (1,220 km/h) to maintain aerodynamic efficiency.^{(Section 4.4)} The design proposed passengers experience a maximum inertial acceleration of 0.5 g, approximately 2 or 3 times that of a commercial airliner on takeoff and landing.

=== Proposed routes ===
Several routes have been proposed that meet the distance conditions for which a hyperloop is hypothesized to provide improved transport times: under approximately 1,500 kilometres (930 miles). Route proposals range from speculation described in company releases, to business cases, to signed agreements.

==== South Korea ====
An agreement was signed in June 2017 to co-develop a hyperloop line between Seoul and Busan, South Korea. The project was shelved in early 2024 after the Korean government withdrew public funding due to questions over the venture's economic viability.

In April 2025, the government launched a research project to develop maglev propulsion technology for the Hypertube, a proposed next-generation high-speed train system, between Seoul and Busan.

==== United States ====
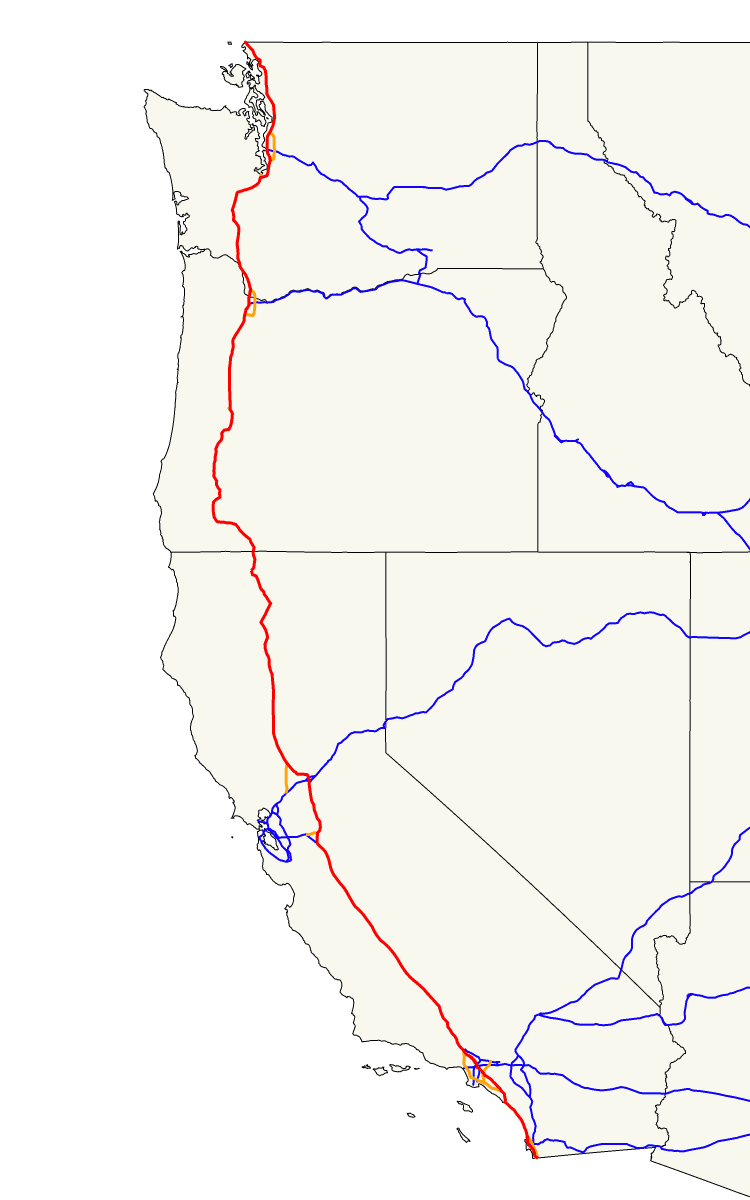
Interstate 5

The route suggested in the 2013 alpha-level design document was from the Greater Los Angeles Area to the San Francisco Bay Area. That conceptual system would begin around Sylmar, just south of the Tejon Pass, follow Interstate 5 to the north, and arrive near Hayward on the east side of San Francisco Bay. Proposed branches were shown in the design document, including Sacramento, Anaheim, San Diego, and Las Vegas.

No work has been done on the route proposed in Musk's design; one cited reason is that it would terminate on the fringes of two major metropolitan areas, Los Angeles and San Francisco. This would result in significant cost savings in construction, but require passengers traveling to and from Downtown Los Angeles and San Francisco, and any other community beyond Sylmar and Hayward, to transfer to another transportation mode to reach their destination. This would significantly lengthen the total travel time to those destinations.

A similar problem already affects present-day air travel, where on short routes (like LAX–SFO) the flight time is only a rather small part of door-to-door travel time. Critics have argued that this would significantly reduce the proposed cost and/or time savings of hyperloop as compared to the proposed California High-Speed Rail project that will serve downtown stations in both San Francisco and Los Angeles.

Others questioned the cost projections for the suggested California route. Some transportation engineers argued in 2013 that they found the alpha-level design cost estimates unrealistically low given the scale of construction and reliance on unproven technology. The technological and economic feasibility of the idea is unproven and a subject of significant debate.

In November 2017, Arrivo announced a concept for a maglev automobile transport system from Aurora, Colorado to Denver International Airport, the first leg of a system from downtown Denver. Its contract described potential completion of a first leg in 2021. In February 2018, Hyperloop Transportation Technologies announced a similar plan for a loop connecting Chicago and Cleveland and a loop connecting Washington and New York City.

In 2018, the Missouri Hyperloop Coalition was formed between Virgin Hyperloop One, the University of Missouri, and engineering firm Black & Veatch to study a proposed route connecting St. Louis, Columbia, and Kansas City.

On 19 December 2018, Elon Musk unveiled a 2-mile (3 km) tunnel below Los Angeles. In the presentation, a Tesla Model X drove in a tunnel on the predefined track (rather than in a low-pressure tube). According to Musk, the costs for the system are US$10 million. Musk said: "The Loop is a stepping stone toward hyperloop. The Loop is for transport within a city. Hyperloop is for transport between cities, and that would go much faster than 150 mph."

The Northeast Ohio Areawide Coordinating Agency, or NOACA, partnered with Hyperloop Transportation Technologies to conduct a $1.3 million feasibility study for developing a hyperloop corridor route from Chicago to Cleveland and Pittsburgh for America's first multistate hyperloop system in the Great Lakes Megaregion. Hundreds of thousands of dollars have already been committed to the project. NOACA's Board of Directors has awarded a $550,029 contract to Transportation Economics & Management Systems, Inc. (TEMS) for the Great Lakes Hyperloop Feasibility Study to evaluate the feasibility of an ultra-high speed hyperloop passenger and freight transport system initially linking Cleveland and Chicago.

==== India ====
Hyperloop Transportation Technologies were considering in 2016 with the Indian Government for a proposed route between Chennai and Bengaluru, with a conceptual travel time of 345 km (214 mi) in 30 minutes. HTT also signed an agreement in 2018 with Andhra Pradesh government to build India's first hyperloop project connecting Amaravathi to Vijayawada in a 6-minute ride.

On 22 February 2018, Hyperloop One entered into a memorandum of understanding with the Government of Maharashtra to build a hyperloop transportation system between Mumbai and Pune that would cut the travel time from the current 180 minutes to 20 minutes.

In 2016, Indore-based Dinclix Ground Works' DGW Hyperloop advocates a hyperloop corridor between Mumbai and Delhi, via Indore, Kota, and Jaipur.

==== Saudi Arabia ====
On 6 February 2020, the Ministry of Transport in the Kingdom of Saudi Arabia announced a contract agreement with Virgin Hyperloop One (VHO) to conduct a ground-breaking pre-feasibility study on the use of hyperloop technology for the transport of passengers and cargo. The study will serve as a blueprint for future hyperloop projects and build on the developers long-standing relationship with the kingdom, which has peaked when Crown Prince Mohammed bin Salman viewed VHO's passenger pod during a visit to the United States.

==== Italy ====
In December 2021, the Veneto Regional Council approved a memorandum of understanding with MIMS and CAV for the testing of hyper transfer technology.

==== Canada ====
In 2016, Canadian hyperloop firm TransPod explored the possibility of hyperloop routes which would connect Toronto and Montreal, Toronto to Windsor, and Calgary to Edmonton. Toronto and Montreal, the largest cities in Canada, are connected by Ontario Highway 401, the busiest highway in North America. In March 2019, Transport Canada commissioned a study of hyperloops, so it could be "better informed on the technical, operational, economic, safety, and regulatory aspects of the hyperloop and understand its construction requirements and commercial feasibility."

The province of Alberta signed a memorandum of understanding (MOU) to support TransPod for its Calgary to Edmonton hyperloop project. TransPod plans to move forward and has secured US$550 million in private capital funding for the first phase, which will create an airport link for Edmonton. However, the company will first need to build and test prototypes on test tracks before the project can begin.

==== Elsewhere in the world ====
In 2016, Hyperloop One published the world's first detailed business case for a 300-mile (500 km) route between Helsinki and Stockholm, which would tunnel under the Baltic Sea to connect the two capitals in under 30 minutes. Hyperloop One undertook yet another feasibility study in 2016, this time with DP World to move containers from its Port of Jebel Ali in Dubai. In late 2016, Hyperloop One announced a feasibility study with Dubai's Roads and Transport Authority for passenger and freight routes connecting Dubai with the greater United Arab Emirates. Hyperloop One was also considering passenger routes in Moscow during 2016, and a cargo hyperloop to connect Hunchun in north-eastern China to the Port of Zarubino, near Vladivostok and the North Korean border on Russia's Far East. In May 2016, Hyperloop One kicked off their Global Challenge with a call for comprehensive proposals of hyperloop networks around the world. In September 2017, Hyperloop One selected 10 routes from 35 of the strongest proposals: Toronto–Montreal, Cheyenne–Denver–Pueblo, Miami–Orlando, Dallas–Laredo–Houston, Chicago–Columbus–Pittsburgh, Mexico City–Guadalajara, Edinburgh–London, Glasgow–Liverpool, Bengaluru–Chennai, and Mumbai–Chennai.

Others put forward European routes, including in 2019 a conceptual route beginning at Amsterdam or Schiphol airport to Frankfurt. In 2016, a Warsaw University of Technology team began evaluating potential routes from Kraków to Gdańsk across Poland proposed by Hyper Poland.

Hyperloop Transportation Technologies (HTT) signed an agreement with the government of Slovakia in March 2016 to perform impact studies, with potential links between Bratislava, Vienna, and Budapest, but there have been no further developments. In January 2017, HTT signed an agreement to explore the route Bratislava—Brno—Prague in Central Europe.

In 2017, SINTEF, the largest independent research organization in Scandinavia, indicated they were considering building a test lab for hyperloop in Norway.

==== Mars ====
According to Musk, hyperloop would be the optimal means of transportation for long-distance travel on Mars, as no tubes would be needed, considering that Mars' atmosphere is about 1% the density of the Earth's at sea level. For the hyperloop concept to work on Earth, low-pressure tubes are required to reduce air resistance. However, if they were to be built on Mars, the lower air resistance would allow a hyperloop to be created with no tube, only a track, and so would be just a magnetically levitating train.

=== Open-source design evolution ===
In September 2013, Ansys Corporation ran computational fluid dynamics simulations to model the aerodynamics of the alpha concept capsule and shear stress forces to which the capsule would be subjected. The simulation showed that the capsule design would need to be significantly reshaped to avoid creating supersonic airflow, and that the gap between the tube wall and capsule would need to be larger. Ansys employee Sandeep Sovani said the simulation showed that hyperloop has challenges but that he is convinced it is feasible.

In October 2013, the development team of the OpenMDAO software framework released an unfinished, conceptual open-source model of parts of the hyperloop's propulsion system. The team asserted that the model demonstrated the concept's feasibility, although the tube would need to be 13 feet (4 m) in diameter, significantly larger than originally projected. However, the team's model is not a true working model of the propulsion system, as it did not account for a wide range of technical factors required to physically construct a hyperloop based on Musk's concept, and in particular had no significant estimations of component weight.

In November 2013, MathWorks analyzed the alpha proposal's suggested route and concluded that the route was mainly feasible. The analysis focused on the acceleration experienced by passengers and the necessary deviations from public roads in order to keep the accelerations reasonable; it did highlight that maintaining a trajectory along I-580 east of San Francisco at the planned speeds was not possible without significant deviation into heavily populated areas.

In January 2015, a paper based on the NASA OpenMDAO open-source model reiterated the need for a larger diameter tube and a reduced cruise speed closer to Mach 0.85. It recommended removing on-board heat exchangers based on thermal models of the interactions between the compressor cycle, tube, and ambient environment. The compression cycle would only contribute 5% of the heat added to the tube, with 95% of the heat attributed to radiation and convection into the tube. The weight and volume penalty of on-board heat exchangers would not be worth the minor benefit, and regardless the steady-state temperature in the tube would only reach 30–40 °F (17–22 °C) above ambient temperature.

According to Musk, various aspects of the hyperloop have technology applications to other Musk interests, including surface transportation on Mars and electric jet propulsion.

Researchers associated with MIT's department of Aeronautics and Astronautics published research in June 2017 that verified the challenge of aerodynamic design near the Kantrowitz limit that had been theorized in the original SpaceX Alpha-design concept released in 2013.

In 2017, Dr. Richard Geddes and others formed the Hyperloop Advanced Research Partnership to act as a clearinghouse of Hyperloop public domain reports and data.

In February 2020, Hardt Hyperloop, Nevomo (formerly Hyper Poland), TransPod and Zeleros formed a consortium to drive standardization efforts, as part of a joint technical committee (JTC20) set up by European standards bodies CEN and CENELEC to develop common standards aimed at ensuring the safety and interoperability of infrastructure, rolling stock, signaling and other systems.

=== Hyperloop Association ===
In December 2022, Hyperloop companies Hardt, Hyperloop One, Hyperloop Transport Technologies, Nevomo, Swisspod, TransPod, and Zeleros formed the Hyperloop Association. The Association's stated aims are to stimulate the development and growth of this emerging new transport market, participate and support institutes in collaborating with government and regulatory agencies on transportation policymaking. The Hyperloop Association is represented by Ben Paczek, CEO and co-founder of Nevomo.

== Hyperloop research programs ==
=== Eurotube ===
EuroTube is a non-profit research organization for the development of vacuum transport technology. EuroTube is currently developing a 3.1 km (1.9 mi) test tube in Collombey-Muraz, Switzerland. The organization was founded in 2017 at ETH Zurich as a Swiss association and became a Swiss foundation in 2019. The test tube is planned on a 2:1 scale with a diameter of 2.2 m and designed for 900 km/h (560 mph)

=== Hyperloop Development Program (HDP) ===
The Hyperloop Development Program is a public-private partnership of public sector partners, industry parties, and research institutions dedicated to prove the feasibility of hyperloop, test and demonstrate in the European Hyperloop Center Groningen, and identify the future prospects and opportunities for industry and stakeholders. The European Hyperloop Center is under constructions and will have a 420-meter test facility including a lane switch and is planned to commence testing in 2024. The total program size is €30 million and it is co-funded with €4.5 million by the Dutch Ministry of Infrastructure and Water Management and Ministry of Economic Affairs and Climate Policy, and €3 million by the Dutch Province of Groningen. Partners in the program include AndAnotherday, ADSE, Royal BAM Group, Berenschot, Busch, Delft Hyperloop, Denys, Dutch Boosting Group, EuroTube, Hardt Hyperloop, the Institute of Hyperloop Technology, Royal IHC, INTIS, Mercon, Nevomo, Nederlandse Spoorwegen, POSCO International, Schiphol Group, Schweizer Design Consulting, Tata Steel, TÜV Rheinland, UNStudio, Vattenfall.

=== Swisspod ===
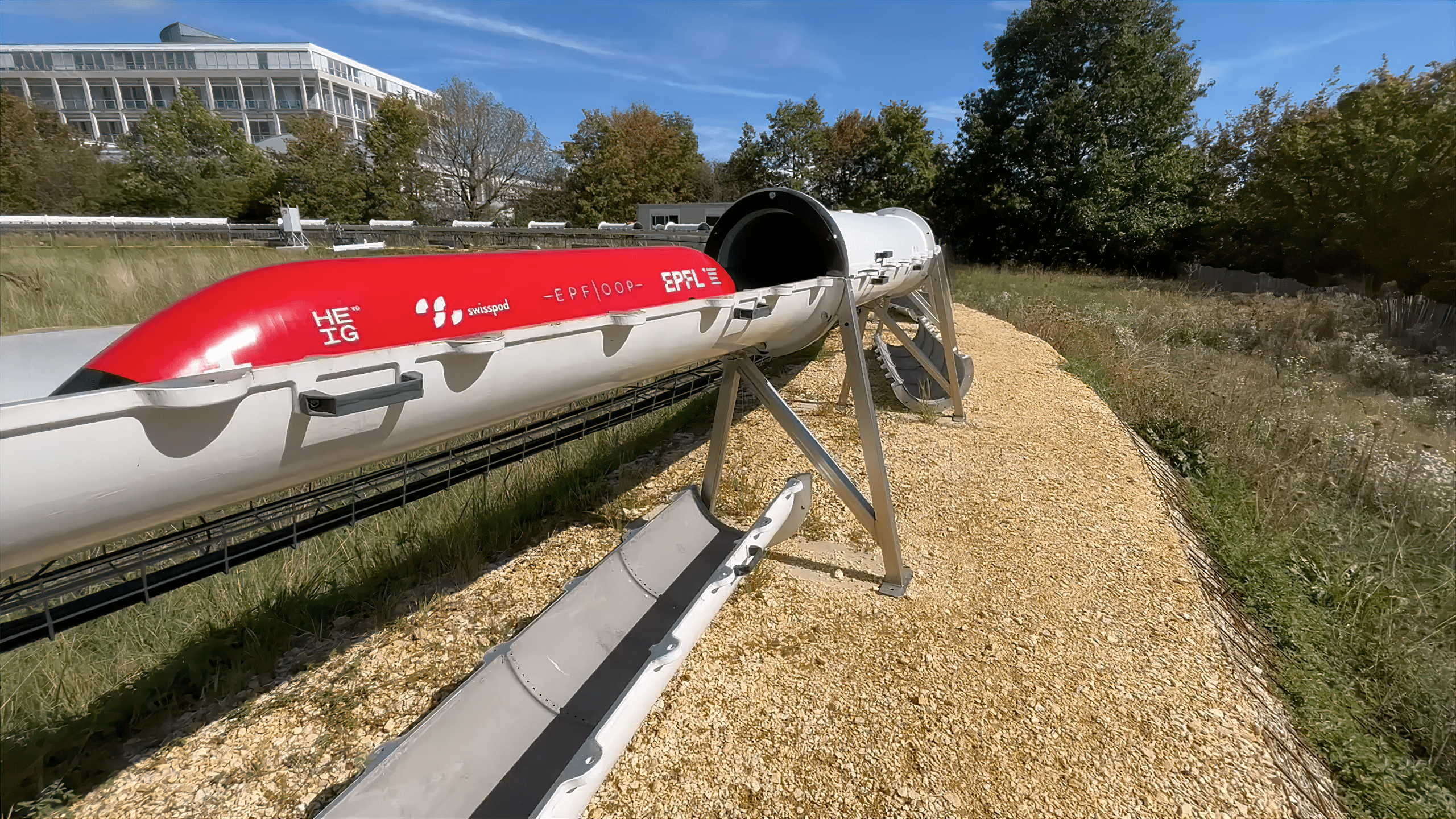
Hyperloop Capsule tested at LIMITLESS infrastructure in Lausanne, Switzerland, by Swisspod, EPFL and HEIG-VD

Swisspod unveiled a 1:12 scale testing facility in a circular shape to simulate an "infinite" hyperloop trajectory in July 2021 on the EPFL campus at Lausanne, Switzerland. During 2023–2024, Swisspod and École Polytechnique Fédérale de Lausanne conducted a series of tests with their first capsule, in which the prototype achieved an 11.8 km (7.3 miles) journey and top speeds of 40.7 km/h (25.3 mph). These results correspond to a projected full-scale hyperloop journey of 141.6 km (88.0 miles) at speeds of up to 488.2 km/h (303.4 mph). The milestone set a world record for the longest hyperloop mission in a controlled low-pressure environment.

Swisspod is constructing a second testing infrastructure in Pueblo, Colorado, United States. As of 2025, the company says the facility is the largest of its kind in the world, with a test track measuring 520 meters (1,700 feet) in length. When completed, the closed-loop system is expected to span one mile and cover 43 acres. In November 2025, the company tested its first hyperloop vehicle, AERYS 1, at the infrastructure in Pueblo, achieving speeds of up to 102 km/h (65 mph).

=== TUM Hyperloop (previously WARR Hyperloop) ===
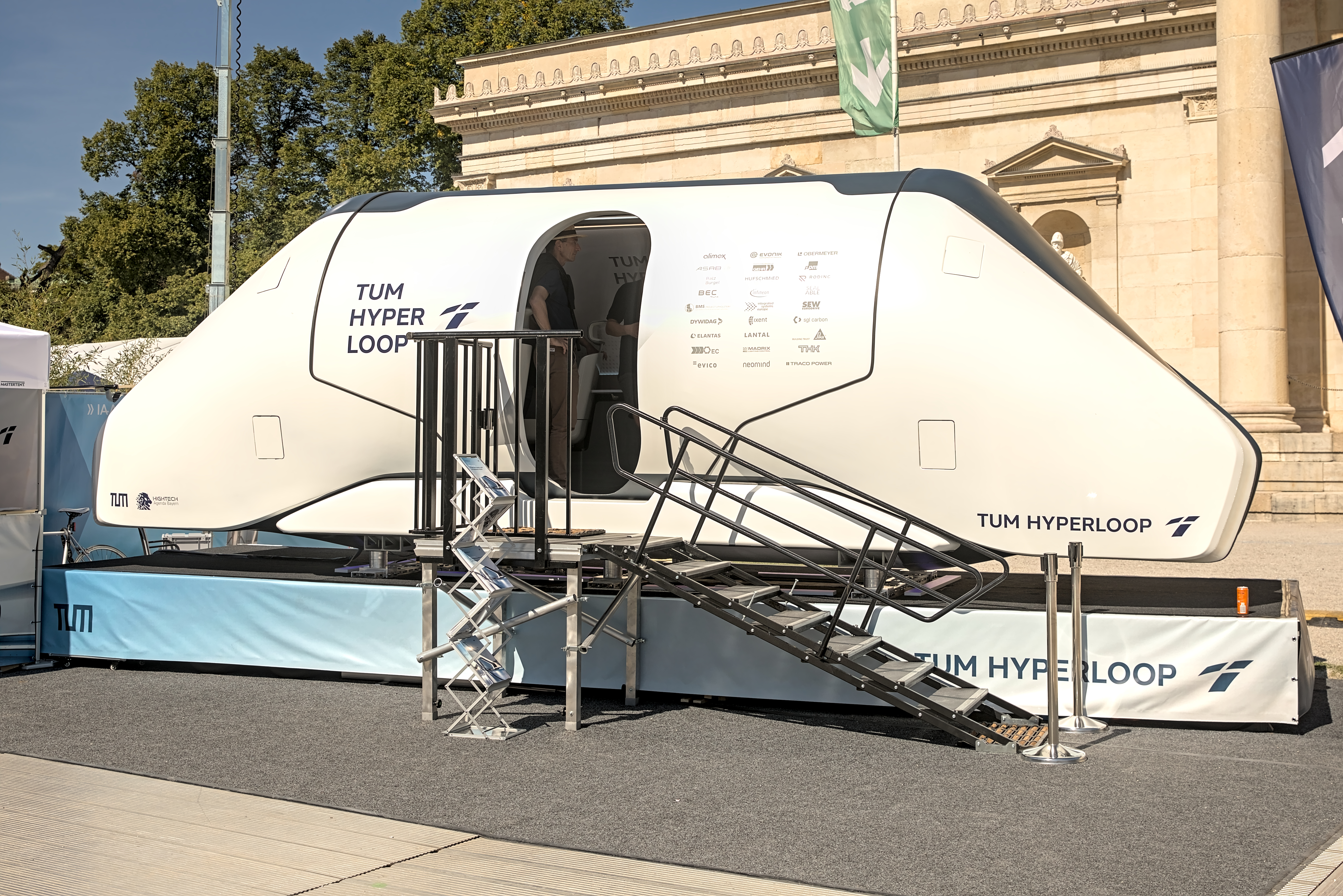
TUM Hyperloop

TUM Hyperloop is a research program that emerged in 2019 from the team of hyperloop pod competition from the Technical University of Munich. The TUM Hyperloop team had won four competitions in a row, achieving a record speed of 463 km/h (288 mph) in 2019. The research program has the goals to investigate the technical feasibility by means of a demonstrator, as well as by simulating the economic and technical feasibility of the hyperloop system. The planned 24 meter demonstrator will consist of a tube and the full-size pod. The next steps after completion of the first project phase are the extension to 400 meters to investigate higher speeds. This is planned in the Munich area, in Taufkirchen, Ottobrunn or at the Oberpfaffenhofen airfield. In July 2023, certification for operation began in Ottobrunn.

== Hyperloop pod competition ==
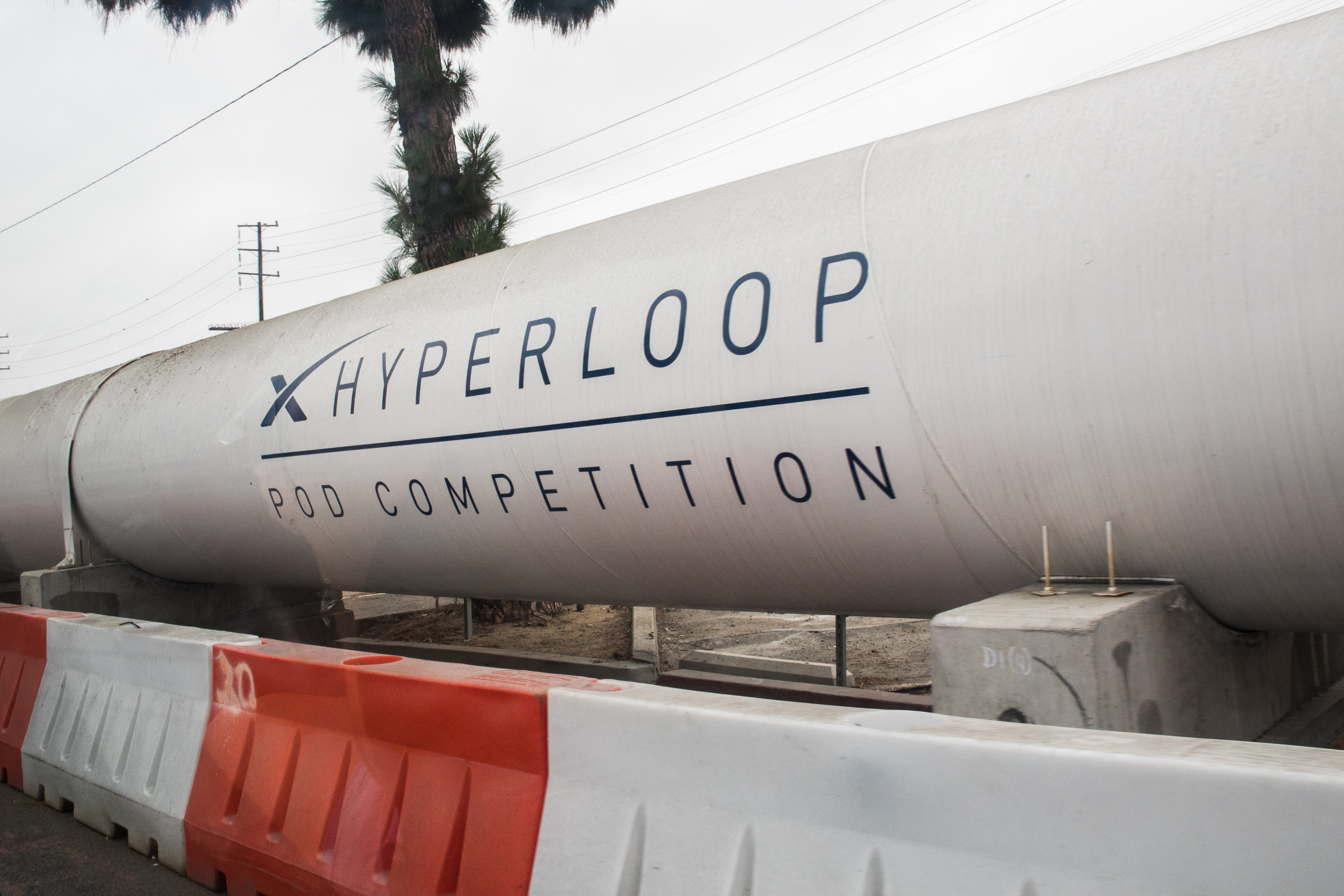
Hyperloop pod competition

Several student and non-student teams were participating in a hyperloop pod competition in 2015–16, and at least 22 of them built hardware to compete on a sponsored hyperloop test track in mid-2016.

In June 2015, SpaceX announced that they would sponsor a hyperloop pod design competition and would build a 1-mile-long (1.6 km) subscale test track near SpaceX's headquarters in Hawthorne, California, for the competitive event in 2016. SpaceX stated in their announcement, "Neither SpaceX nor Elon Musk is affiliated with any Hyperloop companies. While we are not developing a commercial Hyperloop ourselves, we are interested in helping to accelerate development of a functional Hyperloop prototype."

More than 700 teams had submitted preliminary applications by July. A preliminary design briefing was held in November 2015, where more than 120 student engineering teams were selected to submit Final Design Packages due by 13 January 2016.

A Design Weekend was held at Texas A&M University 29–30 January 2016, for all invited entrants. Engineers from the Massachusetts Institute of Technology were named the winners of the competition. While the University of Washington team won the Safety Subsystem Award, Delft University won the Pod Innovation Award as well as the second place, followed by the University of Wisconsin–Madison, Virginia Tech, and the University of California, Irvine. In the Design Category, the winning team was Hyperloop UPV from Universidad Politécnica de Valencia, Spain. On 29 January 2017, Delft Hyperloop (Delft University of Technology) won the prize for the "best overall design" at the final stage of the SpaceX hyperloop competition, while WARR Hyperloop of the Technical University of Munich won the prize for "fastest pod." The Massachusetts Institute of Technology placed third.

The second hyperloop pod competition took place from 25 to 27 August 2017, the only judging criteria being top speed provided it was followed by a successful deceleration. WARR Hyperloop from the Technical University of Munich won the competition by reaching a top speed of 324 km/h (201 mph).

A third hyperloop pod competition took place in July 2018. The defending champions, the WARR Hyperloop team from the Technical University of Munich, beat their own record with a top speed of 457 km/h (284 mph) during their run. The Delft Hyperloop team representing Delft University of Technology landed in second place, while the EPFLoop team from École Polytechnique Fédérale de Lausanne (EPFL) earned the third-place finish.

The fourth competition in July 2019 saw the team from the Technical University of Munich, now known as TUM Hyperloop (by NEXT Prototypes e.V.), again winning the competition and beating their own record with a top speed of 463 km/h (288 mph).

== Criticism ==
=== Rider experience ===
Some critics of Hyperloop focus on the experience—possibly unpleasant and frightening—of riding in a narrow, sealed, windowless capsule inside a sealed steel tunnel, that is subjected to significant acceleration forces; high noise levels due to air being compressed and ducted around the capsule at near-sonic speeds; and the vibration and jostling. Even if the tube is initially smooth, ground may shift with seismic activity. At high speeds, even minor deviations from a straight path may add considerable buffeting. This is in addition to practical and logistical questions regarding how to best deal with safety issues such as equipment malfunction, accidents, and emergency evacuations.

=== Design and safety ===
YouTube creator Adam Kovacs has described Hyperloop as a kind of gadgetbahn because it would be an expensive, unproven system that is no better than existing technologies such as traditional high-speed rail. John Hansman, professor of aeronautics and astronautics at MIT, has pointed out potential design problems, such as how a slight misalignment in the tube would be compensated for, and the potential interplay between the air cushion and the low-pressure air. He has also questioned what would happen if the power were to go out when the pod was miles away from a city. UC Berkeley physics professor Richard Muller has also expressed concern regarding "[the Hyperloop's] novelty and the vulnerability of its tubes, [which] would be a tempting target for terrorists", and that the system could be disrupted by everyday dirt and grime.

The feasibility of Musk's plans to power the hyperloop system with solar panels installed along its length has been questioned by maglev train expert and engineering professor Roger Goodall of Loughborough University. Goodall said that the air pumps and propulsion would probably need much more power than the solar panels could generate.

=== Costs ===
The alpha proposal projected that cost savings compared with conventional rail would come from a combination of several factors. The small profile and elevated nature of the alpha route would enable Hyperloop to be constructed primarily in the median of Interstate 5. However, whether this would be truly feasible is a matter of debate. The low profile would reduce tunnel boring requirements and the light weight of the capsules is projected to reduce construction costs over conventional passenger rail. It was asserted that there would be less right-of-way opposition and environmental impact as well due to its small, sealed, elevated profile versus that of a rail easement; however, other commentators contend that a smaller footprint does not guarantee less opposition. In criticizing this assumption, mass transportation writer Alon Levy said, "In reality, an all-elevated system (which is what Musk proposes with the Hyperloop) is a bug rather than a feature. Central Valley land is cheap; pylons are expensive, as can be readily seen by the costs of elevated highways and trains all over the world." Michael Anderson, a professor of agricultural and resource economics at the University of California, Berkeley, predicted that costs would amount to around US$100 billion.

Projected low ticket prices by Hyperloop developers have been questioned by Dan Sperling, director of the Institute of Transportation Studies at University of California Davis, who stated that "there's no way the economics on that would ever work out." Some critics have argued that, since Hyperloop is designed to carry fewer passengers than typical public train systems, it could make it difficult to price tickets to cover the costs of construction and running. In a study done by the TU Delft researchers claim that the fares would have to be higher than €0.30 per passenger kilometer, compared to €0.174/p-km for high speed rail and €0.183/p-km for air travel.

The early cost estimates of the hyperloop are a subject of debate. A number of economists and transportation experts have expressed the belief that the US$6 billion price tag dramatically understates the cost of designing, developing, constructing, and testing an all-new form of transportation. The Economist magazine said that the estimates are unlikely to "be immune to the hypertrophication of cost that every other grand infrastructure project seems doomed to suffer." Hyperloop One estimated that for a loop around the Bay Area the costs were in a range on $9 billion to $13 billion in total, or from $84 million to $121 million per mile. For another project in the United Arab Emirates the company estimated $52 million per mile and for a Stockholm-Helsinki route the company reported a cost of $64 million per mile. In 2022, the International Maglev Board surveyed transportation experts worldwide who indicated the hyperloop underestimates operational and safety complexity, along with costs for both infrastructure and operation.

== Political considerations ==
Political impediments to the construction of such a project in California may be large due to the "political and reputation capital" invested in the existing mega-project of California High-Speed Rail. Because replacing that with a different design would not be straightforward given California's political economy, Texas has been suggested as an alternate for its more amenable political and economic environment.

Building a successful hyperloop sub-scale demonstration project could reduce the political impediments and improve cost estimates. In 2013, Musk suggested that he might become personally involved in building a demonstration prototype of the hyperloop concept, including funding the development effort.

According to The New York Times, "The central impediment" to the Hyperloop is that it "would require creating an entire infrastructure. That means constructing miles-long systems of tubes and stations, acquiring rights of way, adhering to government regulations and standards, and avoiding changes to the ecology along its routes."

== Hyperloop companies ==
Company name	Country	Est.	Status	Notes
Arrivo	U.S.	2016	Defunct (2018)	Ended hyperloop development in November 2017 in favor of maglev transportation. Shut down in 2018.
DGWHyperloop	India	2015	Defunct (2026)	
Hardt Hyperloop	Netherlands	2016	Defunct (2026)	
Hyperloop Italia	Italy	2020	Active	Subsidiary of Hyperloop Transportation Technologies
Hyperloop One	U.S.	2014	Shut down (2023)	Ended development of passenger travel in February 2022 to focus on freight. Shut down in December 2023.
Hyperloop Transportation Technologies	U.S.	2013	Active	
Nevomo	Poland	2017	Ended Hyperloop focus	In 2019 refocused on MagRail, but continues to be active in Hyperloop ecosystem, such as in the Hyperloop Association. Named Hyper Poland until November 2020.
Swisspod	Switzerland	2019	Active	
Hyperloop Genesis	U.S.	2015	Active	SpaceX Redmond
TransPod	Canada, France	2015	Active	
Zeleros	Spain	2016	Defunct (2026)	
TuTr Hyperloop	India	2022	Active	

== Related concepts ==
=== Historical related concepts ===
- The pneumatic tube, using high pressures behind a capsule to move it forward, was suggested in 1799 by the British mechanical engineer and inventor George Medhurst. In 1812, Medhurst wrote a book detailing his idea of transporting passengers and goods through airtight tubes using air propulsion.
- In 1824 John Vallance patented a pneumatic tube railway. In 1826 he constructed a model of it at his premises in Brighton. The scheme was considered uneconomic both because of its costs and because prospective passengers would be repelled by being enclosed in a tube.
- Beach Pneumatic Transit was operated from 1870 to 1873 as a one-block-long prototype of an underground tube transport public transit system in New York City, following a concept by Alfred Ely Beach. The system worked at near-atmospheric pressure, with the passenger car moved by means of higher pressure air applied to the back of the car while comparatively lower pressure air was maintained in front of the car.
- Vactrains were explored in the 1910s, as described by American rocket pioneer Robert Goddard and others. Unlike pneumatic tubes, these do not use pressure for propulsion, but instead utilize a hard vacuum to eliminate drag ahead of the vehicle. The vehicle is both suspended and propelled by magnetic levitation.
- Swissmetro was a proposal to run a maglev train in a low-pressure environment. Concessions were granted to Swissmetro in the early 2000s to connect the Swiss cities of St. Gallen, Zurich, Basel, and Geneva. Studies of commercial feasibility reached differing conclusions and the vactrain was never built.
- ET3 Global Alliance (ET3) was founded by Daryl Oster in 1997 with the goal of establishing a global transportation system using passenger capsules in frictionless maglev full-vacuum tubes. Oster received interest from Elon Musk potentially investing in a 3-mile (5 km) prototype of ET3's proposed design.
- In 2003, Franco Cotana led the development of Pipenet, with a 100 m-long (110 yd) 1.25 m-diameter (1.37 yd) prototype system constructed in Italy in 2005, with a vision to use an evacuated tube for moving freight at up to 2,000 km/h (1,200 mph) using linear synchronous motors and magnetic levitation. However development stopped after funding ceased.
- In August 2010, a vacuum-based maglev train able to move at 600 mph (1,000 km/h) was proposed for China, projected to cost CN¥10–20 million (US$2.95 million at the August 2010 exchange rate) more per kilometer than regular high-speed rail. In 2018, a short 45 m (49 yd) loop test track was completed to test some parts of the technology.

=== Vactrains using the moniker 'Hyperloop' ===
- In 2018, a concept for creating and using intermodal Hyperloop capsules was presented in an academic journal. After detaching the drive elements, capsules could potentially be used in a way similar to traditional containers for fast transport of goods or individuals. It was further proposed that specialized airplanes, dedicated high-speed trains, road tractors or watercraft could perform "last mile" transport for solving the problem of fast transportation to centers where hyperloop terminals are locally unavailable or infeasible to be constructed.
- In May 2021, it was reported that a low-vacuum sealed tube test system capable of reaching speeds around 1,000 km/h (620 mph) had begun construction in Datong, Shanxi Province. An initial 2 km (1.2 mi) section was completed in 2022 and the full 15 km (9.3 mi) test line is planned to be completed within two years. The line is being constructed by the North University of China and the Third Research Institute of China Aerospace Science and Industry Corporation.
- In July 2021, an experimental European operational Hyperloop testing facility concept was begun. The test tube was made of an aluminum alloy, with a loop diameter of 40 m (130 ft) and 120 m (390 ft) long, built by the Swiss-American startup Swisspod and the Distributed Electrical Systems Laboratory (DESL) of École Polytechnique Fédérale de Lausanne.
- In September 2021, Swisspod Technologies and MxV Rail (formerly TTCI), a subsidiary of the Association of American Railroads (AAR), began collaboration to potentially build a full-scale testing facility for Hyperloop technology on the Pueblo Plex campus in Pueblo, Colorado, US. The primary purpose of this facility would be to conduct research and development activities on Swisspod's proprietary Hyperloop propulsion system.

== See also ==
- Gravity train
- Gravity-vacuum transit
- Ground-effect train
- High-speed rail
- Kantrowitz limit
- Maglev
- Pneumatic tube
- Swissmetro
- Transatlantic tunnel
- Vactrain
- European Hyperloop Week
