= Franco Cotana =

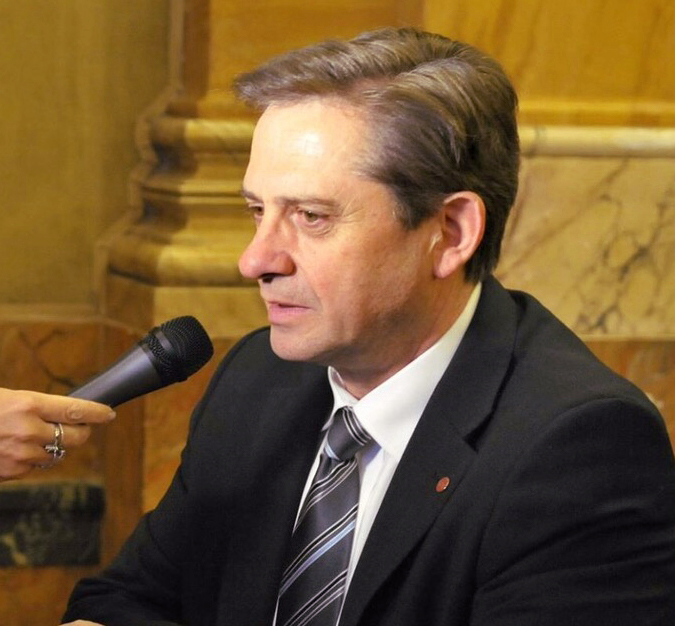
- Born: 22 December 1957 (age 68); Marsciano, Italy
- Occupations: engineer and scientist

Franco Cotana (born 22 December 1957 in Marsciano) is an Italian engineer, scientist, and a member of the board of directors of the University of Perugia from 2014 to 2019. He was formerly president from March until October 2014 of the National Commission's IPPC-AIA at the Ministry of the Environment.

== Early life ==
A native of Monte Vibiano-Mercatello (Perugia), Cotana obtained a diploma with top honors at the State Technical Institute in 1976, and in 1983 he graduated cum laude in electrical engineering from the University of Rome La Sapienza. He financially supported his studies by designing and building electrical systems and windings for electric motors with a winding machine he designed.

== Career ==
In January 1982, he won a national competition and got a job at ENEL, where he worked at the laboratory Measurements and HV lines and, subsequently, in the engineering role at DCO of Viale Regina Margherita where he dealt with the design of thermal power plants. Showing early sign of an entrepreneurial spirit he quit a secure job at ENEL and, from 1985 to 1990, shared his working time between Italy and the USA where he worked for major American companies (in Texas and California) in the field of test and burn-in on electronic components.

In 1991, he won a post as a researcher in the scientific discipline of environmental technical physics at the Energy Institute of the new Faculty of engineering at the University of Perugia, having helped the growth of laboratories of applied acoustics-electro-acoustics, and thermophysical properties of fluids and environmental controls. In 1998, he won the competition to become an associate professor. In 2001, he became a full professor of industrial and technical physics in the Faculty of engineering at the university to coordinate technical physics section of the Department.

Since 2010, he has been a member of the New York Academy of Sciences.

In 2003, he founded the National Center for Research on Biomass (CRB) which he directed until June 2013 when the CRB was merged in the CIRIAF (Inter-University Research Centre on pollution and the environment with a strong multidisciplinary character that includes hundreds of teachers from 14 universities) of which he became contextually Director until 2015. Thanks to his efforts, a PhD in Engineering was born based in CRB that from 2013 it became an international multidisciplinary doctorate in energy and sustainable development of which Prof. Cotana is Coordinator and President. Today, the CRB-CIRIAF is the only University in Italy by inter-research that offers a PhD course.

Author of over 300 scientific publications in highly interdisciplinary journals and holder of 20 patents, he is an expert evaluator of national and international projects MIUR with over 20 years of experience. From 2009, he has been the Italian representative in Brussels for the SET-Plan EIBI (strategic energy technology plan – European industrial bioenergy Initiative). Among his best known patents: PIPENET is an innovative transportation system for light goods at very high speed, TEAM is the energy Tower Multifunctional Environmental for the Smart City; The SEA is the innovative system of cultivation of micro-algae in ocean and marine spaces for Blue Growth, Albedo Control is finally the project for climate change mitigation.

In 2014, after several experiences in various boards of public companies-private, Prof. Cotana became member of the board of directors of the University of Perugia as one of the 5 members elected by the University Senate representing the Engineering, Veterinary and Agricultural sciences. Since July 2023 he is the CEO of RSE https://www.rse-web.it/.
