= Hyperloop UPV =

Student team

- Awarded for: Top Design Concept Award and Propulsion/Compression Subsystem Technical Excellence Award
- Sponsored by: Altran
- Location: Hawthrone, California
- Country: Spain
- Hosted by: SpaceX | Elon Musk
- Formerly called: Hyperloop Makers UPV
- Website: hyperloopupv.com

Hyperloop UPV (a. k. a. Hyperloop Makers UPV) is a team of students from the Universitat Politècnica de València (Valencia, Spain) with the aim of designing Hyperloop, a proposed future means of transport. With renewable energies, the vehicle is planned levitate inside a vacuum tube, with the goal of reaching 1,200 km/h (750 mph).

The concept developed by Hyperloop UPV is distinguished by the use of magnetic levitation based on attraction to the top of the tube thanks to its levitation units located at the top of the pod, instead of air-bearing systems based on repulsion to a rail located at the bottom of the tube. Moreover, its aerodynamic design allows to a compensation of inertial forces that permit a higher radius of curvature, a lower cost for the air-evacuation and up to a 30% savings in infrastructure, with respect to other proposals. This revolutionary concept of Hyperloop is powered by detachable batteries and is propelled through compression and expansion of the air with a nozzle. A turbine recovers energy from the flow allowing a more efficient journey. With all these features it is pretended to reach velocities up to 1200 km/h, in a totally efficient manner, due to the use of renewable energies and prescinding from the use of fossil fuels.

The initial team in Design Weekend was composed of five students from the student community Makers UPV: Ángel Benedicto, Daniel Orient, David Pistoni, Germán Torres and Juan Vicén, together with advisor Vicente Dolz, assistant professor at CMT- Motores Térmicos, Universitat Politècnica de València. They were awarded Top Design Concept and Propulsion/Compression Subsystem Technical Excellence Award at SpaceX's Design Weekend, the first phase of the Hyperloop Pod Competition 1 held in Texas in January 2016.

The team was expanded to more than 30 students in September 2016 in order to build a full-size prototype for SpaceX's Pod Competition, and in April 2017 the team was selected by SpaceX to participate in the Hyperloop Pod Competition 2, which was held in Los Angeles days 25–27 August 2017 in collaboration with Purdue University, becoming the world's first transatlantic student collaboration in the history of the development of the Hyperloop. They ranked amongst the best ten teams of the world in the Hyperloop Pod Competition 2. Nowadays, being a team of more than 40 people and with the support of many institutions and enterprises, the team is designing an improved prototype with the aim of winning the Hyperloop Pod Competition 3, scheduled in summer 2018.

== History ==
The project has its origins in August, 2015, when a team of five students of the Makers Community of the Polytechnical University of Valencia decided to take part in a competition organized by Elon Musk, the Hyperloop Design Weekend. This decision was taken as a result of a piece of news that one of them read, in which was said that with Hyperloop, airplanes would be useless for medium-range journeys (about 600 km) and all the universities worldwide were invited to participate in this competition in order to make Hyperloop a reality. The Hyperloop Makers UPV team was created in August 2015 when Daniel Orient, aerospace engineering student, read in a piece of news that with Hyperloop, airplanes would be useless for medium-range journeys (about 600 km). When he discovered that Elon Musk was organising a contest to make Hyperloop a reality and that it was open-source, he decided to ask for help to Makers UPV, a local community of makers from Valencia, Spain. That's when Ángel Benedicto, David Pistoni, Germán Torres and Juan Vicén decided to take part on the project and build together their own Hyperloop concept.

The team was selected to take part on the contest by SpaceX, and during this time until the competition was held, in January, 2016, these five UPV students wrote the "Hyperloop Makers UPV Technical Report", a scientific report that groups all the specifications and the design of its concept of Hyperloop. Once the competition arrived, due to the support given by the UPV, the team had the opportunity to travel to Texas and compete against universities around the world. Hyperloop UPV obtained Top Design Concept Award and Propulsion/Compression Subsystem Technical Excellence Award. Time after the competition, the team gained international attention worldwide because they were the smallest team and they obtained the highest "awards-to-team size" ratio, with 2 awards for a team of 5 students plus their university advisor. All these leads to a huge media impact, appearing on Spanish TV and radio shows besides the talks they performed through the whole Peninsula.

A few months later, in September, 2016, after obtaining the support of many institutions and companies (ISTOBAL, Nagares S.A. a Spanish company focused on research, development, manufacturing and sales of electronic systems mainly for the automotive sector., Marca España.), the team grew until being more than 30 members, recruiting the most brilliant and motivated students of the Polytechnic University of Valencia.

Before the next competition, the new and expanded team worked on prototype design and construction to compete in the USA in the 2018 Hyperloop Pod Competition 2. Hyperloop UPV started a collaboration with Purdue University and built the Atlantic II, a prototype resulting from the first transatlantic student Hyperloop development collaboration. The team got to be amongst the 10 highest-ranking teams of the world with one of the most complete prototypes.

After the competition, the team expanded until being 35 members that will work hand in hand in order to make the concept of Hyperloop a reality.

In October, 2017 the team got the necessary support in order to install the Hyper-Track, a vacuum tube similar to the one used in SpaceX. Being one of the first in Europe, the Hyper-Track allows to carry out all the necessary tests to develop the technologies used in the new design of the prototype.

Nowadays, Hyperloop UPV works everyday in order to design a new improved prototype with the aim of presenting it in the next competition, scheduled in August, 2018.

== Team ==
Hyperloop UPV team is currently formed by 35 members plus advisors. The team has a horizontal organization it is led by a project manager, that is responsible for the management all the sub-teams, being a total of six, each led by its respective manager. These sub-teams are: Propulsion, Structures, Avionics, Energy, Partners & Economics and Creative. All of them work together in order to make Hyperloop a reality.

== List of hyperloop vehicles ==
Name	Year	Specifications
Makers UPV	2016	Awarded Best Concept Design and Best Propulsion System at the Hyperloop Design Weekend design competition sponsored by Elon Musk's SpaceX at Texas A&M University.
The Atlantic II	2017	First Hyperloop vehicle prototype developed by Hyperloop UPV in cooperation with Purdue University. Ranked among the top 10 in the world at the Telsa/SpaceX Elon Musk Hyperloop Pod Competition in Los Angeles, California, USA.
Valentia	2018	The second prototype Hyperloop vehicle from Hyperloop UPV. Innovation Award at the Elon Musk Competition in Los Angeles, California, USA.
Turian	2019	The third prototype Hyperloop vehicle from Hyperloop UPV. Participated in Elon Musk's SpaceX Hyperloop Pod competition in Los Angeles, California, USA. Ranked among the top 10 in the world.
Ignis	2021	The fourth prototype Hyperloop vehicle from Hyperloop UPV. After Elon Musk canceled the competition in the US, this vehicle participated in the first European Hyperloop Week and was awarded.
Auran	2022	The fifth Hyperloop vehicle from Hyperloop UPV. Participated in the second European Hyperloop Week in Holland. First in the world to integrate electromagnetic suspension and on-board linear motor.
Kénos	2023	The sixth Hyperloop vehicle from Hyperloop UPV. Take part in the third European Hyperloop Week in Scotland. Integrates electromagnetic suspension and optimized on-board linear motor.
Vesper	2024	The seventh Hyperloop vehicle from Hyperloop UPV. Participate in the fourth European Hyperloop Week in Zurich, Switzerland. It integrates hybrid electromagnetic suspension and onboard linear motor, as well as an interface to be accelerated with the linear motor on the track (also called "booster"). The vehicle won the main prize of the "Complete Pod Award" competition".

== List of hyperloop infrastructure ==
Name	Year	Specifications
Hyper-Tube	2017	The university's first hyperloop test track tube infrastructure, 12-meter vacuum chamber that uses flexible solar panels to activate the pressurization system and test the Hyperloop vehicles inside.
Hyper-Tube II	2022	Second Hyperloop tube infrastructure (20 meters length, 0.86 cm diameter) presented by Hyperloop UPV, first test tube infrastructure created by a team for a Hyperloop competition.
Hyper-Tube III	2023	Third Hyperloop tube infrastructure (30 meters length, 0.86 cm diameter) presented by Hyperloop UPV, pressurization system included.
