= Keio Alpha =

Japanese student design team

Keio Alpha is a student design team formed by a group of postgraduate students from Graduate School of System Design and Management, Keio University, Japan. In July 2015, the team accepted an invitation from Elon Musk to submit design entries for an open-source pod that would advance Hyperloop technology development, in the SpaceX-sponsored Hyperloop pod competition.

The team was founded by David Chew Vee Kuan with his faculty advisor, Prof Yoshiaki Ohkami, to build a team of four students to submit a preliminary design to SpaceX for review. The team proposed the vision of Hyperloop System in connecting satellite cities with major cities of distance more than 500 km but able to travel at speed of plane and at the convenience of a train. People able to move from the place they live and the place they work where could be 500 km apart but only 30minutes away. The team proposed a pod design using Magnetic Levitation, Light Vacuum Tolerant Vehicle System, Magnetic Brake System and Safety System Architecture in their design proposal. Following review of the high-level design, the team was invited to the Design Weekend at Texas A&M University on 29–30 January 2016 to present their ideas and design to panel of judges along with other 120 teams. Keio Alpha Hyperloop Team was selected as one of the 30 finalist teams to build, and then race, their pod in the prototype vacuum tube test track adjacent to SpaceX Headquarters at Hawthorne, (Los Angeles) California, USA.
