= Makers UPV =

College student group in Valencia, Spain

- Formation: April 15, 2013; 13 years ago
- Type: Non-profit student organisation
- Purpose: Education, Hands-on experience, Do It Yourself
- Location: Casa del Alumno, Valencia, Spain
- Coordinates: 39.4804082°N 0.3435011°W
- Members: > 100 members
- Official language: Spanish, English, German
- Co-founders: Juan Carlos Sebastiá García and Juan Vicén Balaguer
- Other initial members: Jaime Pérez Álvarez, David Pistoni Pérez, Francisco Presencia Fandos, Germán Torres Royo
- Parent organization: Universitat Politècnica de València
- Website: makersupv.com

Makers UPV is a non-profit community of students from the Universitat Politècnica of València (Valencia, Spain) founded in April 2013, whose objective is to enhance the learning experience of students by adding a practical approach based on "experiential learning", Do it yourself and the Maker Culture. Through projects, competitions and workshops taught by the students with special abilities (they acting as mentors), the community is retrofitted and grows.

The community has gained international attention through their success in competitions, being awarded "Top Hyperloop Design Concept" and "Best Propulsion Subsystem" with project Hyperloop UPV at Hyperloop Pod Competition ( SpaceX, 2016), "Top People's Choice" with project NextVision (2014) at NASA International Space Apps Challenge as well as "Global Top 5 Best Use of Hardware" with project GoSat (2015) and Mars UPV (2016) among others.

== List of Awards ==
Project	Award	Location	Promoter	Date
Hyperloop UPV	"Top Hyperloop Design Concept" and "Best Propulsion Subsystem"	Texas A&M University, College Station (USA)	SpaceX, Elon Musk	January 2016
Mars UPV	"Global Top 5 Best Use of Hardware"	Valencia (Spain)	NASA International Space Apps Challenge	March 2016
VIBand	"Think Big"	Madrid (Spain)	Telefónica	May 2016
GoSat	"Global Top 5 Best Use of Hardware"	Valencia (Spain)	NASA International Space Apps Challenge	May 2016
NextVision	"Top People's Choice"	Florida (USA)	NASA International Space Apps Challenge	May 2014
HawaDawa	"2nd Prize at "Think Make Start" Makeathon	Munich (Germany)	Technical University of Munich	March 2015
HCube	Exhibited at international innovation Congress Sonar+D	Barcelona (Spain)	Sonar+D	June 2015
Makers Alpha & Beta	"2nd prize in the competition"	Barcelona (Spain)	AESS Challenge Barcelona	November 2013

== Activities ==
The community has also organized some events with national impact such as BeMakerFest (October 2015), aiming to merge makers and crafter communities, as well as the Olympic Robotic Challenge (2014, 2015, 2016), a multidisciplinary educational robotics competition in which students learn to build their own robot from scratch with open-source hardware such as Arduino and Raspberry Pi (2016). In May 2016 the community held the first Spanish Hebocon, a competition for crappy robots invented by Daiju Ishikawa, which had the support of David Cuartielles, father of the open-source hardware movement. In May 2016 Makers UPV was featured in the blog of Startup Europe (European Commission).

=== Workshops ===
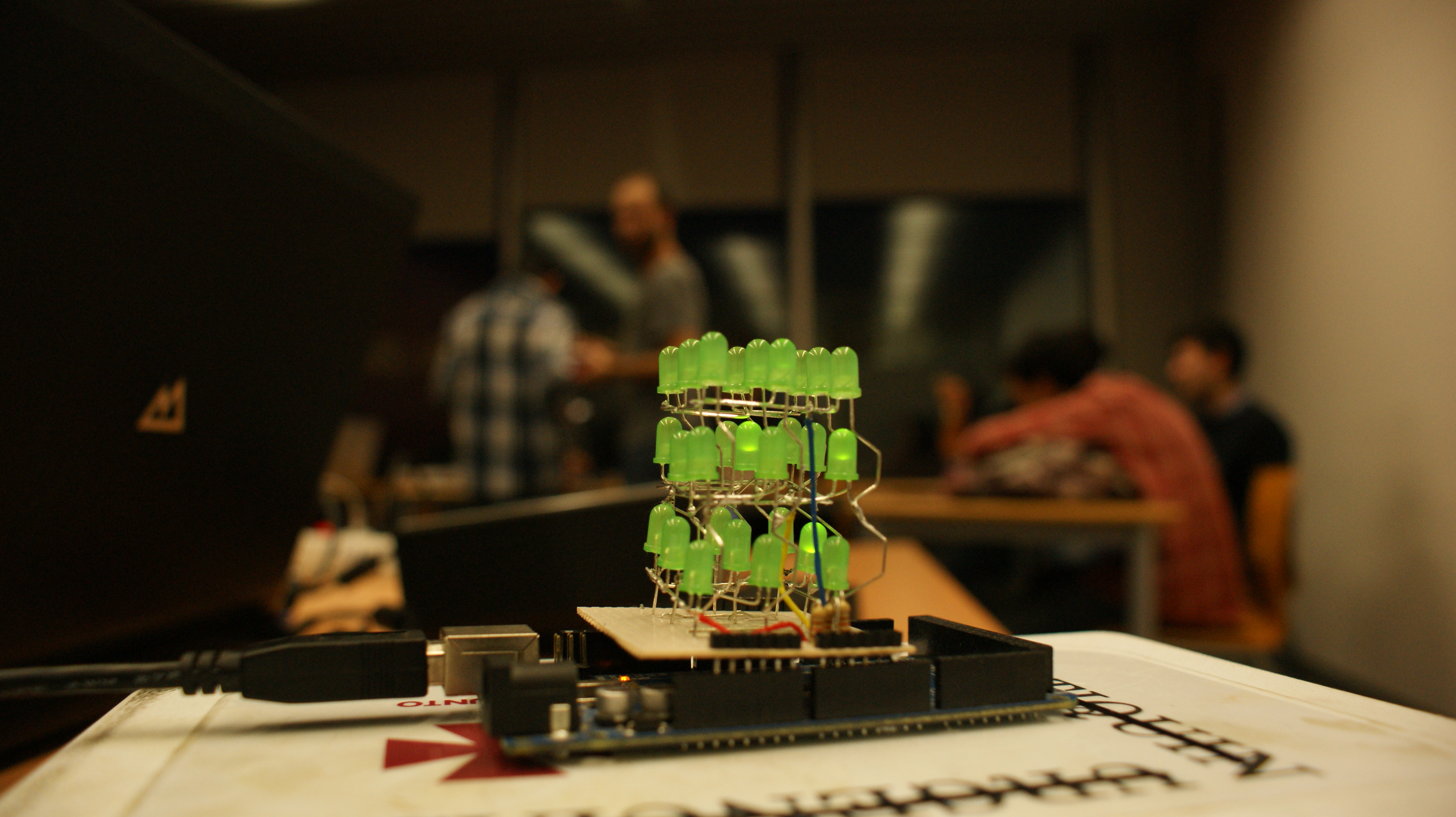
LED Cube Workshop by Makers UPV

The workshops are taught by students who have special abilities (usually the older ones but not necessarily), they acting as mentors. With their knowledge, mentors offer other students the possibility to have a personal experience and to learn by doing. Typical workshops include: Arduino, programming, electronics, 3D printing, CAD, robotics as well as arts & crafts: cyanotype, sculpture, engraving or photography. The main purpose of the workshops are to obtain hands-on experience and skills at the university. Usually the workshops are open-sourced to the community.

=== Competitions ===
The members of the community are connected thanks to the social networks, and they share interesting contests. When a contest sounds interesting to them, they ask other members to join and multidisciplinar working groups are created for that special purpose. This has led to several awards, as stated before in List of Awards. Competitions motivate students to work hard and enable them to establish new relationships with other members of the community.

=== Organisation of events ===
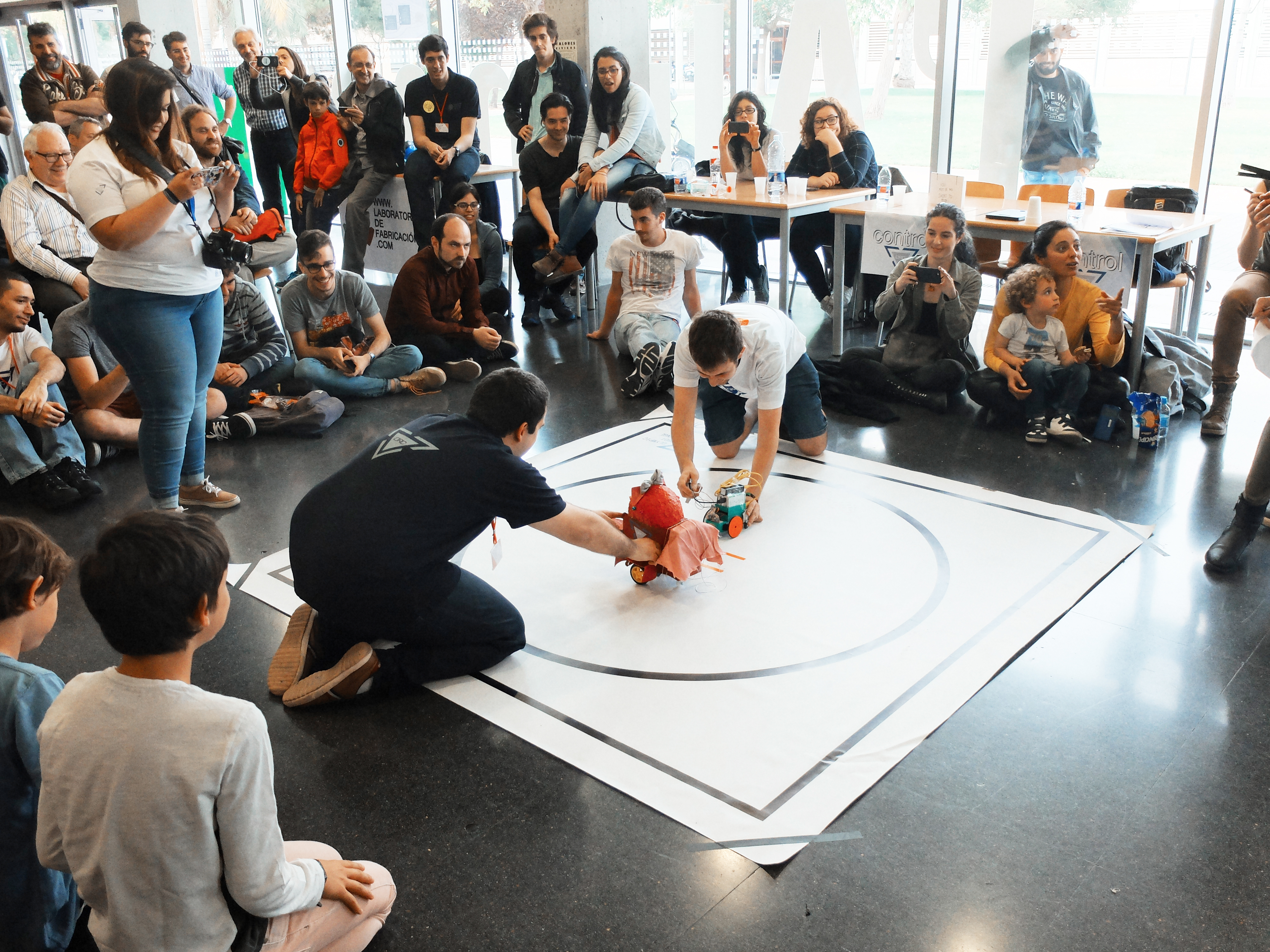
Hebocon Valencia 2016

The Makers UPV community has organised or co-organised several events, which include:

- BeMakerFest Valencia 2015: in collaboration with FabLab VLC, Chiquiemprendedores and Hackerspace Valencia, with support from Ayuntamiento de Valencia.
- Olympic Robotic Challenge 2016 + Hebocon 2016: supported by David Cuartielles, cofounder of Arduino.

Also, the community has helped to organise the following events:

- Olympic Robotic Challenge 2015.
- Olympic Robotic Challenge 2014.
- Mini Maker Fest Valencia 2014.

Finally, the community takes part in several events to spread the word around the city of Valencia:

- European Maker Week (June 2016, Worldwide)
- Primavera Educativa (May 2016, Valencia). Project showcase.
- Techfest Valencia (October 2015)
- Kids Hack Day (November 2014, Valencia). Workshop: design of a robotic arm. Founded by Carl Bärstad. Organised by Chiquiemprendedores.

=== Team projects ===
The community is based on collaboration, and that's why usually some members unite in several groups of interest. For example: the 3D Printing group created a 3D printer for the community, the Web Development team developed the website of Makers UPV, Hyperloop UPV, and other projects. Here some of the projects:

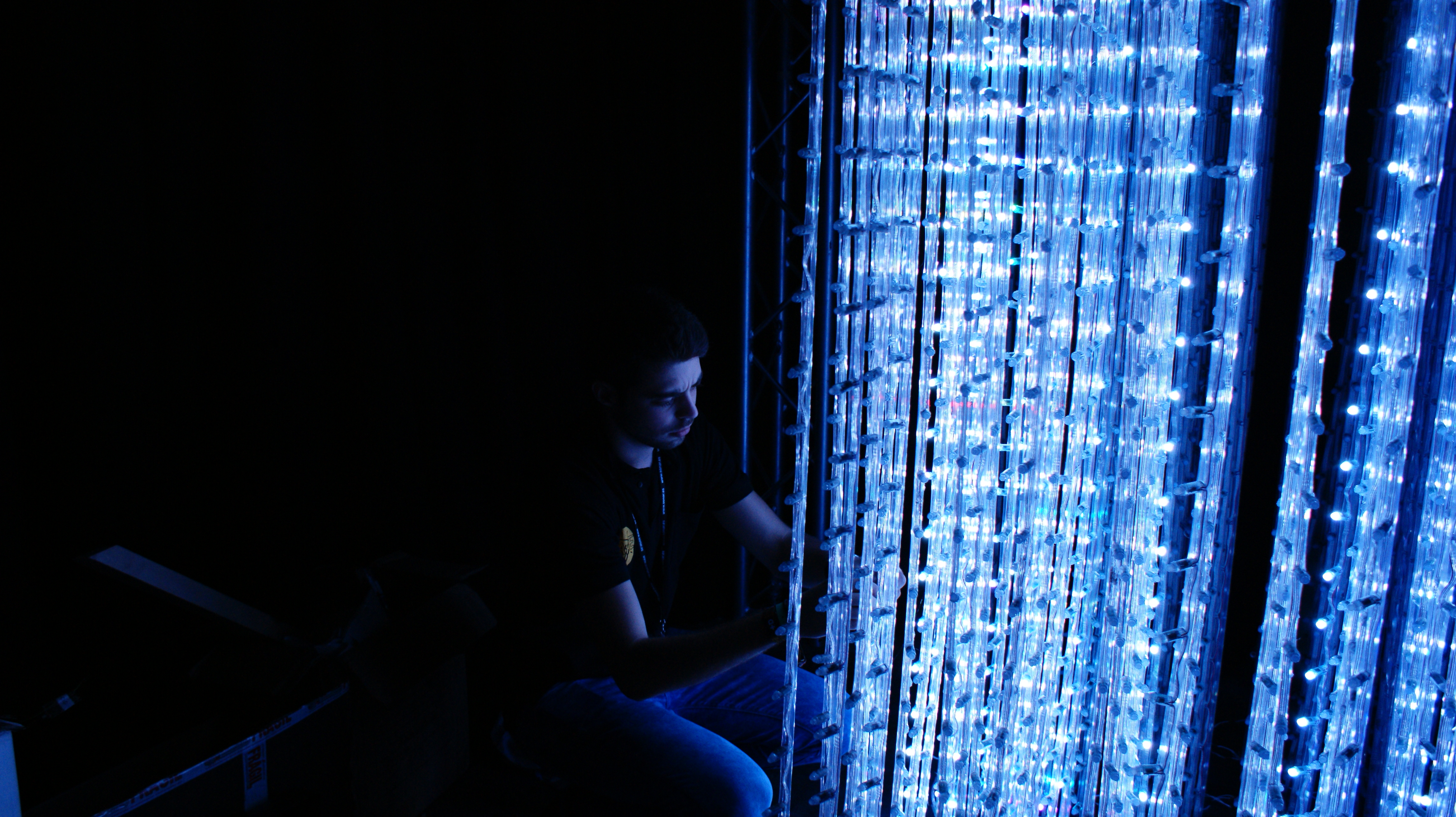
- HCube Project by Makers UPV for Sonar+D 2015
  Project HCube: it was created by a team of members of Makers UPV with the purpose of showcasing the design at International Innovation Congress Sonar+D in Barcelona (June 2015). HCube is a three-dimensional interactive display of LEDs that form a two-meter cube. Each of the LEDs has the ability to reproduce 16 million colors, providing endless visual possibilities. Users can interact with the cube through a number of peripheral devices. The user is able to control the cube through body movement, play Tetris or Snake with it, communicate with it using Twitter, use it to visualize sound and music, and more.
- Project Firebot: a fire-extinguishing robot made to automatically extinguish fires without human risk.

=== Visits to companies ===
The community also organises visits to companies to strengthen the link between students and companies. For example, the makers visited a factory to see how tablets are made, the Vandellos Nuclear Power Plant, Quaternium (makers of drones and quadcopters), a Gas Compression Facility of Endesa in Paterna as well as an aerodrome in Requena.

=== Education for kids ===
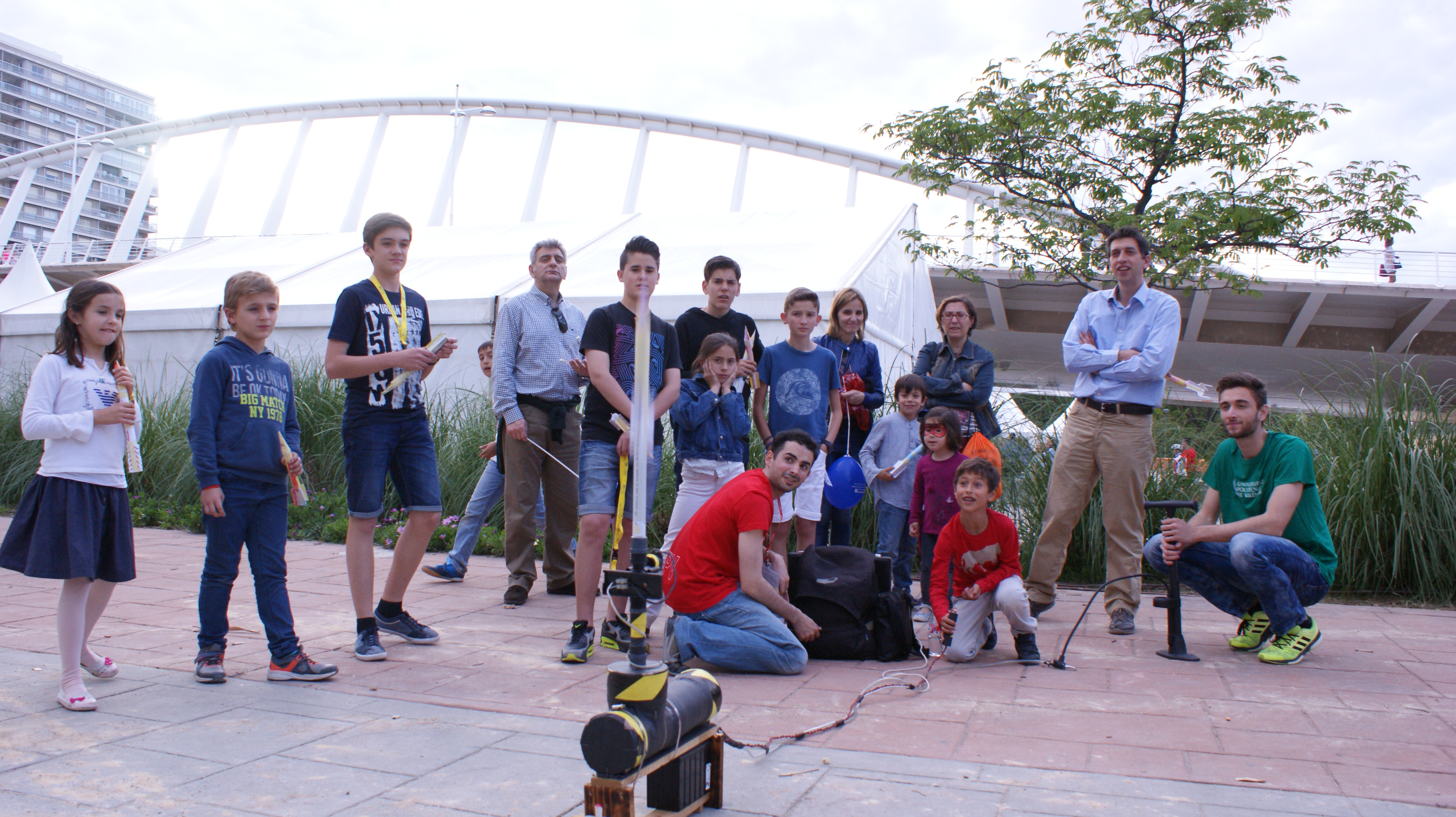
Rocket Workshop by Makers UPV at Valencia, April 2016

Makers UPV has a special focus on education for kids. The community has therefore partnered with several organisations to offer STEM workshops for kids, such as:

- Robotic arm: with Arduino, wood/cardboard and some servos, the kids learn how to build a robotic arm from scratch.
- Drawdio: invented at MIT, kids learn how electrical circuits work by creating an easy circuit made by a pencil and other components, which make sound.
- Rocket science: with paper and scissors, kids build rockets that can be launched thanks to an air pump.
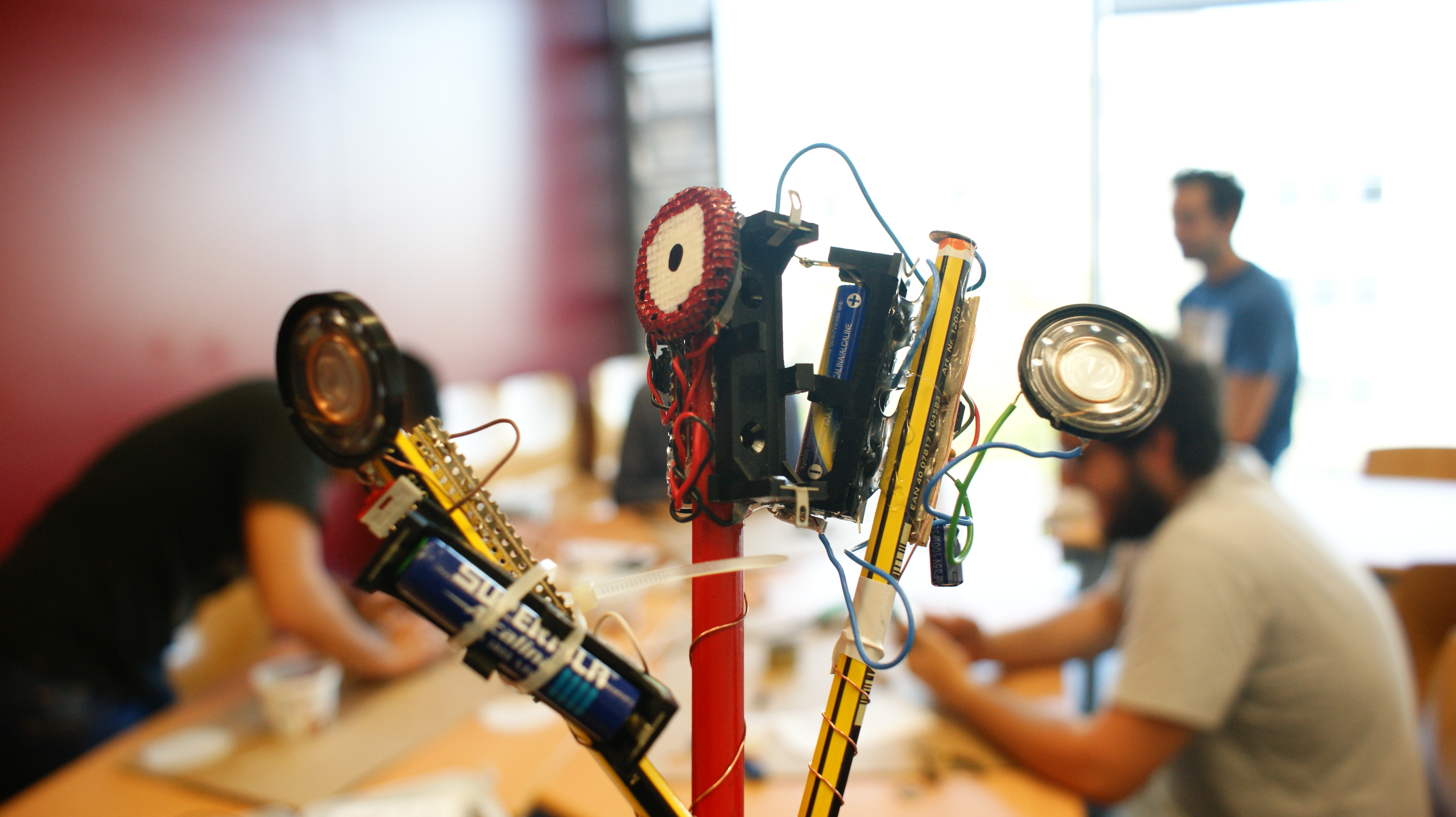
  Drawdio Workshop Makers UPV
