= European Hyperloop Week =

Annual hyperloop community event

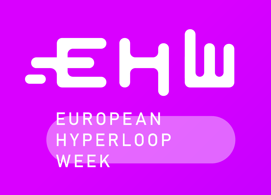
- Nickname: EHW, Hyperloop Week
- Status: Active
- Genre: Hyperloop, Technology, Innovation, Research, Competition
- Frequency: Annual
- Location: Varies
- Country: Netherlands, Scotland, Spain or Switzerland
- Years active: 4+ years
- Most recent: Zurich 2024
- Previous event: Groningen 2026
- Next event: Groningen 2027
- Participants: ~450
- Attendance: ~1100-1500 (2022)
- Major events: Competitions, Conferences, Workshops, Exhibitions
- Organizer: Delft Hyperloop, HYPED, Hyperloop UPV and Swissloop
- Website: European Hyperloop Week

The European Hyperloop Week (EHW) is the largest annual hyperloop-centered community event in the world dedicated to the development and innovation of hyperloop technology. The event features a combination of activities, including competitions, conferences, workshops, demonstrations, exhibitions and social gatherings. It aims to foster collaboration between students, academia, industry, and governments to accelerate the advancement of hyperloop systems and its full-scale implementation.

== History ==
Following the cancellation of SpaceX's Hyperloop pod competition in 2020, teams around the world were eager to continue innovating and competing but lacked a platform to showcase their work. In response, four European student teams—Delft Hyperloop, HYPED, Hyperloop UPV, and Swissloop—joined forces to create their own competition: the European Hyperloop Week (EHW). EHW was established to provide a platform for the hyperloop community to come together to compete, innovate, network, and share knowledge.

The event has grown in prominence and participation since its inception, attracting student teams, industry experts, and companies from around the world. The spirit of the event is described by their slogan: Fostering Innovation Through Collaboration.

Overview of European Hyperloop Week Editions
Edition	Year	Host country	City	Date	Winner	Main partner(s)
1st	2021	Spain	Valencia and Cheste	July 19–25, 2021	Swissloop	Universitat Politècnica de València and Circuit Ricardo Tormo
2nd	2022	Netherlands	Delft and Hilversum	July 18–24, 2022	Delft Hyperloop	TU Delft and Voestalpine
3rd	2023	Scotland	Edinburgh	July 17–23, 2023	Swissloop	University of Edinburgh
4th	2024	Switzerland	Zurich and Dübendorf	July 15–21, 2024	Hyperloop UPV	ETH Zurich and Swiss Innovation Park Zurich
5th	2025	Netherlands	Groningen and Veendam	July 14–20, 2025	Delft Hyperloop	Hardt Hyperloop and European Hyperloop Center
6th	2026	Netherlands	Groningen and Veendam	July 13–19, 2026	Swissloop	Hardt Hyperloop and European Hyperloop Center

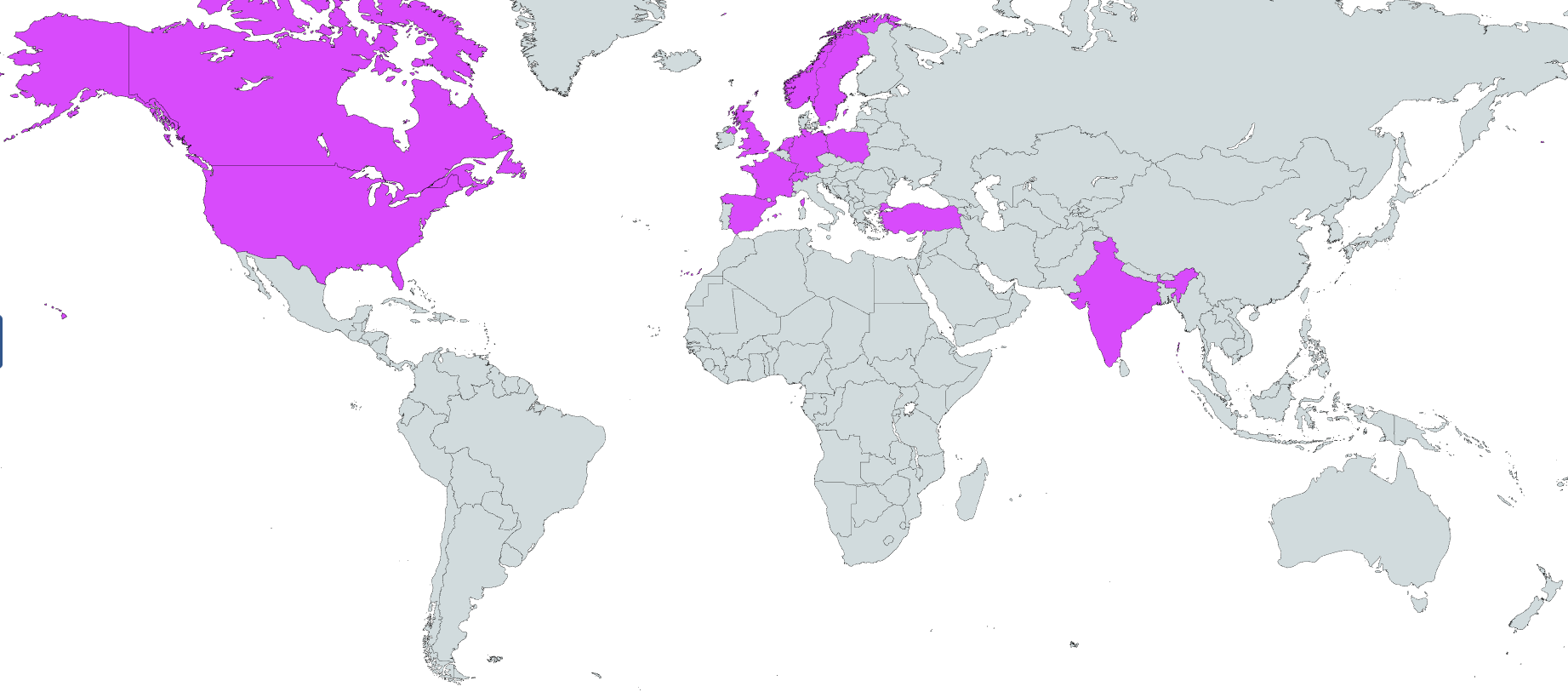
Map of countries of participating student teams (2023)

== Activities ==
=== Conference ===
EHW hosts a series of presentations, panel discussions, and workshops led by students, industry experts, researchers, and academics. These sessions cover a wide range of topics related to hyperloop technology, infrastructure, regulation, and sustainability. They form a platform for open-source research and networking.

=== Competition ===
One of the main attractions of EHW is the hyperloop pod competition, where student teams from universities globally design, build, and test their hyperloop pods. These competitions include three main categories as of 2024: Complete System Demonstration, Promising Subsystem Demonstration and Research Submission. The goal is to push the boundaries of current hyperloop technology and full-scale implementation, and inspire the next generation of engineers and innovators.

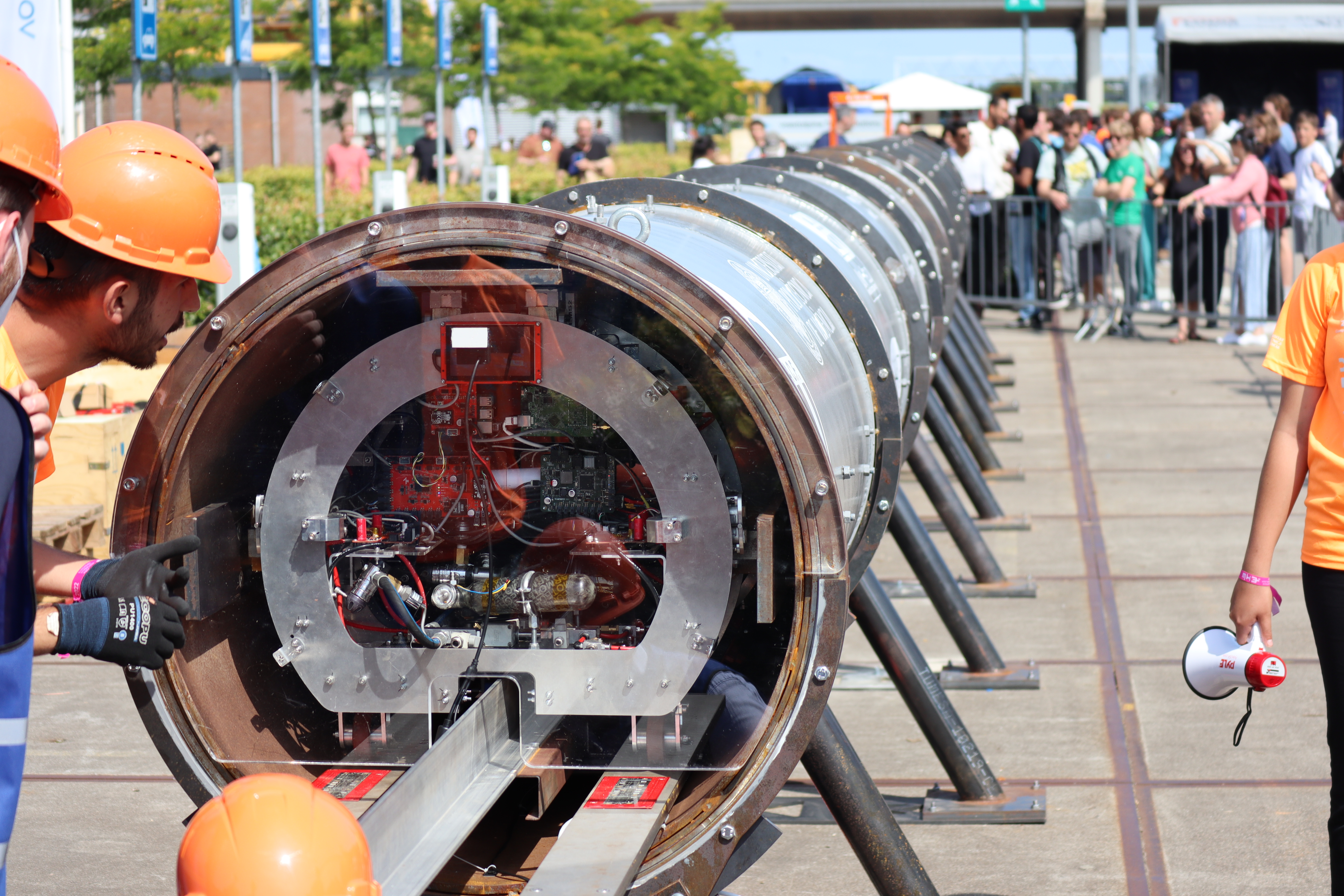
Hyperloop UPV Pod Demonstration during the 2022 European Hyperloop Week in the Netherlands

Student teams are evaluated by a technical jury consisting of industry experts, academics and former student team members.

Teams participate in various technical and strategic categories, including:

- Overall System Award
- Levitation
- Propulsion
- Braking
- Complete Pod Demonstration
- Scalability and Innovation
- Communications and Public Engagement

=== Overall System Awards Winners ===
The following table summarizes the top 3 teams in the Overall System category of the European Hyperloop Week from 2021 to 2025:

Edition	Year	Location (Country)	1st place	2nd place	3rd place	Source
1st	2021	Valencia (Spain)	Swissloop	Delft Hyperloop	HYPED (Edinburgh)	
2nd	2022	Delft / Hilversum (Netherlands)	Delft Hyperloop	Swissloop	Hyperloop UPV	
3rd	2023	Edinburgh (Scotland)	Swissloop	Delft Hyperloop	Hyperloop UPV	
4th	2024	Zurich / Dübendorf (Switzerland)	Hyperloop UPV	mu-zero Hyperloop	Swissloop	
5th	2025	Groningen / Veendam (Netherlands)	Delft Hyperloop	Swissloop	Hyperloop UPV	
6th	2026	Groningen / Veendam (Netherlands)	Swissloop	Hyperloop UPV	Delft Hyperloop	

=== Public events ===
The event serves on one hand as a networking hub for students, professionals and companies. It offers participants the chance to connect with potential employers, partners, and investors. On the other hand, the platform generates awareness about the hyperloop concept amongst the general public. This networking aspect is crucial for fostering collaborations and driving future projects in the hyperloop industry and in adjacent industries such as railway, electronics, pneumatics and other fields of engineering.

EHW includes exhibitions where companies and organizations involved in the hyperloop ecosystem showcase their latest technologies, products, and services. These exhibitions provide a glimpse into the cutting-edge advancements and innovations in the field.

=== Online ===
The European Hyperloop Week hosts the largest knowledge hub of hyperloop-related research papers, and annually collects and publishes student team submissions for open-source access on their website. They have also organized and promoted online seminars on hyperloop-related topics.

== Organization ==
European Hyperloop Week is coordinated jointly by four founding university teams: Delft Hyperloop (Netherlands), Hyperloop UPV (Spain), Swissloop (Switzerland), and HYPED (Scotland). These teams share responsibility for the event's strategic planning, governance, and execution, regardless of the host location, ensuring a truly collaborative and international approach.

The organizational structure also includes members from other participating student teams, fostering continuity, innovation, and diversity within the volunteer-led initiative. While the legal foundation representing the event is based in Zurich, Switzerland—serving administrative and compliance functions—operational leadership remains distributed equally among the founding teams.

The event is funded and supported through sponsorships, institutional partnerships, and contributions from the participating teams.

== Participating Teams (2021–2026) ==
Team Name	University / Institution	Country	City	Website	Years of participation
Delft Hyperloop	Delft University of Technology	🇳🇱 Netherlands	Delft	delfthyperloop.nl	2021, 2022, 2023, 2024, 2025, 2026
Swissloop	ETH Zurich	🇨🇭 Switzerland	Zurich	swissloop.ch	2021, 2022, 2023, 2024, 2025, 2026
Hyperloop UPV	Universitat Politècnica de València	🇪🇸 Spain	Valencia	hyperloopupv.com	2021, 2022, 2023, 2024, 2025, 2026
HYPED	University of Edinburgh	🏴󠁧󠁢󠁳󠁣󠁴󠁿 Scotland	Edinburgh	teamhyped.co.uk	2021, 2022, 2023, 2024, 2025, 2026
mu-zero Hyperloop	KIT + University of Stuttgart	🇩🇪 Germany	Karlsruhe / Stuttgart	mu-zero.de	2021, 2022, 2023, 2024, 2025, 2026
Team Tachyon	RWTH Aachen + FH Aachen	🇩🇪 Germany	Aachen	https://www.tachyonhyperloop.de/	2023, 2024
Alpha ETA Hyperloop	Gebze Technological University	🇹🇷 Türkiye	Gebze	https://www.gturobotik.com/alfa-eta/	2023, 2024, 2025
loopMIT	MIT	🇺🇸 USA	Cambridge, MA	loop.mit.edu	2023, 2024, 2025
Cornell Hyperloop	Cornell University	🇺🇸 USA	Ithaca, NY	cornellhyperloop.com	2023, 2024, 2025, 2026
Avishkar Hyperloop	IIT Madras	🇮🇳 India	Chennai	avishkarhyperloop.in	2023, 2024, 2025, 2026
Vegapod	MIT-WPU	🇮🇳 India	Pune	https://www.vegapodhyperloop.in/	2023, 2024, 2025, 2026
Force Hyperloop	NIT Trichy	🇮🇳 India	Tiruchirapalli	https://www.forcehyperloop.com/	2025
Starloop	Yilmaz Technical University	🇹🇷 Türkiye	Istanbul		2023, 2024, 2025
Warwick Hyperloop	University of Warwick	🇬🇧 United Kingdom	Warwick	warwickhyperloop.co.uk	2023, 2024, 2025
Shift Hyperloop	NTNU	🇳🇴 Norway	Trondheim	shift-hyperloop.com	2023
Queen's Hyperloop	Queen’s University	🇬🇧 United Kingdom	Belfast	qhdt.ca	2022, 2023, 2024, 2025
XTU Hyperloop	KTH Royal Institute of Technology	🇸🇪 Sweden	Stockholm	–	2023, 2024, 2025
Thunderloop UT	University of Twente	🇳🇱 Netherlands	Enschede	thunderloop.nl	2023, 2024, 2025
Supaero Hyperloop	ISAE-SUPAERO	🇫🇷 France	Toulouse	supaero-hyperloop.fr	2023, 2024, 2025
Hyperbee	Istanbul Technical University (ITU)	🇹🇷 Türkiye	Istanbul	https://tr.linkedin.com/company/ituhyperbee?	2023, 2024, 2025, 2026
Hyperloop Manchester	University of Manchester	🇬🇧 United Kingdom	Manchester	hyperloopmanchester.com	2023, 2024, 2025, 2026
UTH Hyperloop	University of Toronto	🇨🇦 Canada	Toronto	–	2023, 2024, 2025
Hyperlink	IIT Hyderabad (assumed)	🇮🇳 India	Hyderabad	–	2023, 2024, 2025
Hyperjackets	Georgia Tech	🇺🇸 USA	Atlanta, GA	gthyperjackets.com	2023, 2024, 2025
Hyperloop UC	University of Cincinnati	🇺🇸 USA	Cincinnati, OH	hyperloopuc.com	2024, 2025
Creatiny Technology Society	Karadeniz Technical University	🇹🇷 Türkiye	Trabzon	creatiny.com	2025
OneLoop	University of California	USA	Davis		2023

== Impact ==
Since its launch in 2021, the European Hyperloop Week has become one of the leading student-led mobility competitions in Europe. It has contributed to the development of early-stage hyperloop technologies, talent development, and academic-industry collaboration.

More than 1,000 engineering, business, and design students from over 30 countries have participated in the event since its inception, with top technical universities such as Delft University of Technology, ETH Zurich, Universitat Politècnica de València, and the University of Edinburgh consistently represented.

The event has been hosted in major European innovation hubs, including:

- Valencia, Spain (2021)
- Delft and Hilversum, Netherlands (2022)
- Edinburgh, Scotland (2023)
- Zurich and Dübendorf, Switzerland (2024)
- Groningen and Veendam, Netherlands (2025 & 2026)

The rotating host model has allowed the event to engage diverse academic ecosystems and municipal stakeholders across Europe.

The competition has also attracted significant support from sponsors and industry and institutional stakeholders. These sponsors contribute through financial backing, technical mentorship, jury participation, and hosting site visits or demonstrations. The visibility of EHW has also helped strengthen European collaboration around hyperloop standardization and infrastructure strategy.

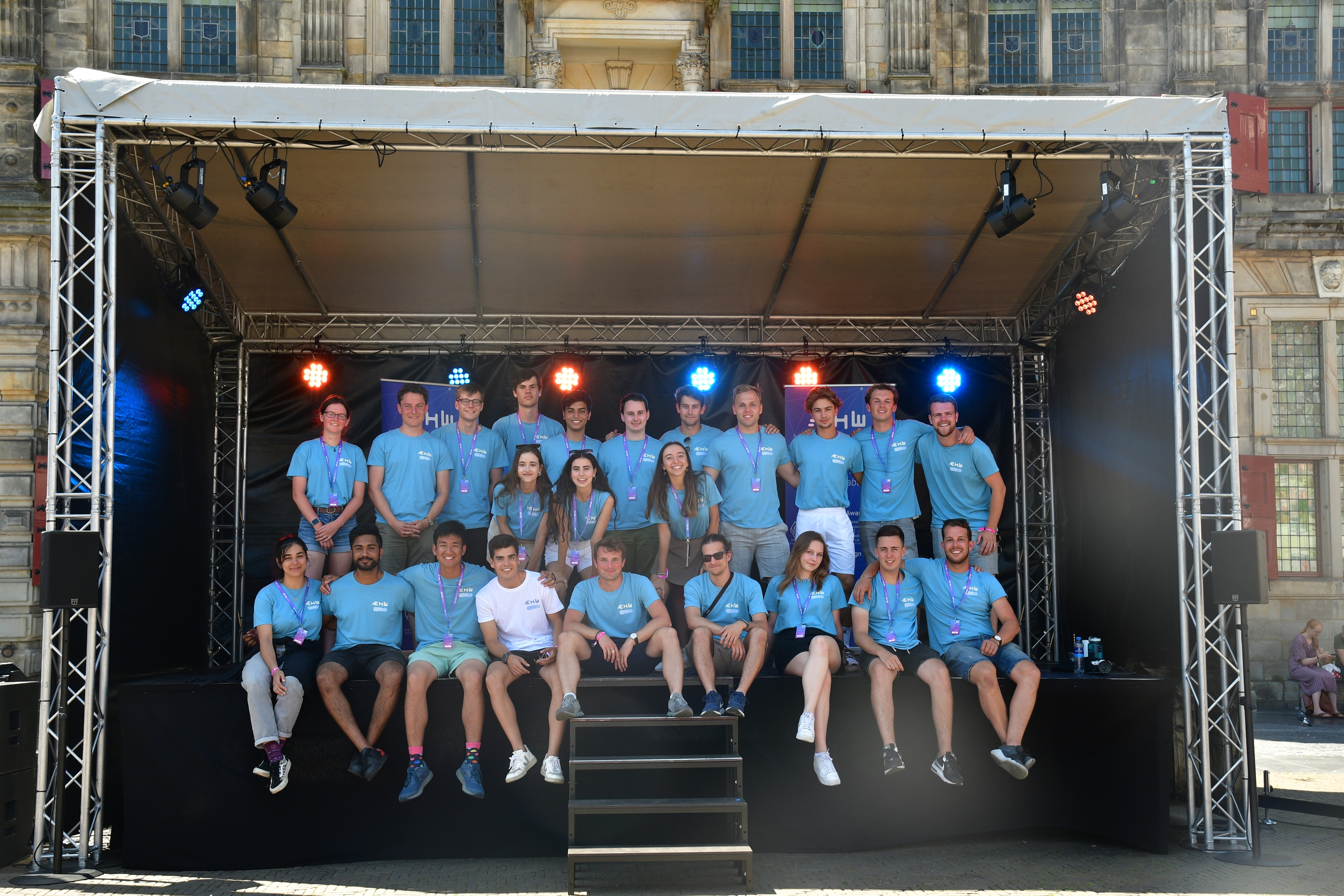
The team of student volunteers organizing the second edition of the European Hyperloop Week in 2022

== See also ==
- Hyperloop pod competition
