= Scientific Workgroup for Rocketry and Spaceflight =

Scientific workgroup at Technical University of Munich

The Scientific Workgroup for Rocketry and Spaceflight (WARR) (German: Wissenschaftliche Arbeitsgemeinschaft für Raketentechnik und Raumfahrt) is a scientific workgroup situated at Technical University of Munich, composed mainly of its students. It was founded by students in 1962 with the goal to compensate for the lack of a chair for space technology at the university at the time. Since the establishment of such a chair in 1966, the group has conducted practical projects, starting with the first successful development and of a hybrid rocket in Germany. One rocket of this type was launched in 1972, another is on permanent display at Deutsches Museum. WARR has attained some public attention by for its projects in space elevator competitions, small satellites interstellar spaceflight concepts, and for winning all SpaceX Hyperloop pod competitions.

Currently, WARR works in the fields of bi-liquid propulsion, satellite technology, robotics, and transportation technologies.

WARR is one of the founding members of the German National Student Space Flight Society (Bundesverband studentischer Raumfahrt e.V.), a national organisation of student space clubs, similar to SEDS.

== History ==
| 1962 | Founding of WARR by Robert Schmucker |
| 1966–1974 | Research on engines for hybrid rockets |
| 1974 | First flight of Barbarella (first German hybrid rocket, displayed in German Museum) |
| since 1975 | Research on engines for liquid-propellant rockets |
| 2000 | Construction of a hybrid demonstrator engine |
| 2002 | Occupation of the new space in Garching and establishing a dynamometer |
| 2004 | Presentation of projects at ILA in Berlin, Germany |
| since 2005 | Scientific payload T-Rex on the Swedish sounding rocket Rexus in cooperation with the chair for space travel and the EADS Astrium GmbH. |
| | Work on the following projects: space elevator, cubesat (mini satellite) and Micro-Hybrid (miniature hybrid engine) |
| 2006 | First WARR Winter Launch (WWL, model rocket contest) and presentation of the project at the ILA in Berlin, Germany |
| 2009 | Founding of WARR Interstellar Flight Team |
| 2011 | Organization and participation in the first European Space Elevator Challenge (EUSPEC) on the grounds of TU Munich |
| 2012 | Contribution to IdeenPark in Essen, Germany |
| 2012 | Participation in SpaceUp conference in Stuttgart, Germany |
| 2012 | Founding of a project group for satellite technology, and the initiation of work on Cubesat MOVE-II financed by German Aerospace Center |
| 2013 | Founding of the project group STERN, aiming to break the student record for rocket altitude in Europe |
| 2013 | Founding of the project group "WARR Space Manufacturing" for research on 3D printing in microgravity |
| 2013 | Launch of the student satellite First-MOVE into a polar orbit |
| 2013 | The project group ‘’Interstellar Space Flight’’ wins the international Project Icarus Design Competition for uncrewed interstellar space probes with fusion engines |
| 2015 | Launch of the experimental rocket WARR-Ex2 from CLBI in Brazil |
| 2015 | The project group ’’Interstellar Space Flight’’ wins the international Dragonfly Design Competition for uncrewed interstellar space probes with laser sail engines |
| 2015 | Founding of WARR Hyperloop and the development of a prototype for a Hyperloop capsule for the SpaceX Hyperloop pod competition |
| 2017 | Winner of the Hyperloop pod competition I with a top speed of 93 km/h |
| 2017 | Winner of the Hyperloop pod competition II with a top speed of 323.5 km/h |
| 2018 | Winner of the Hyperloop pod competition III with a top speed of 457 km/h |
| 2019 | Winner of the Hyperloop pod competition IV with a top speed of 463.5 km/h |

== Project groups of WARR ==
=== Rocketry ===
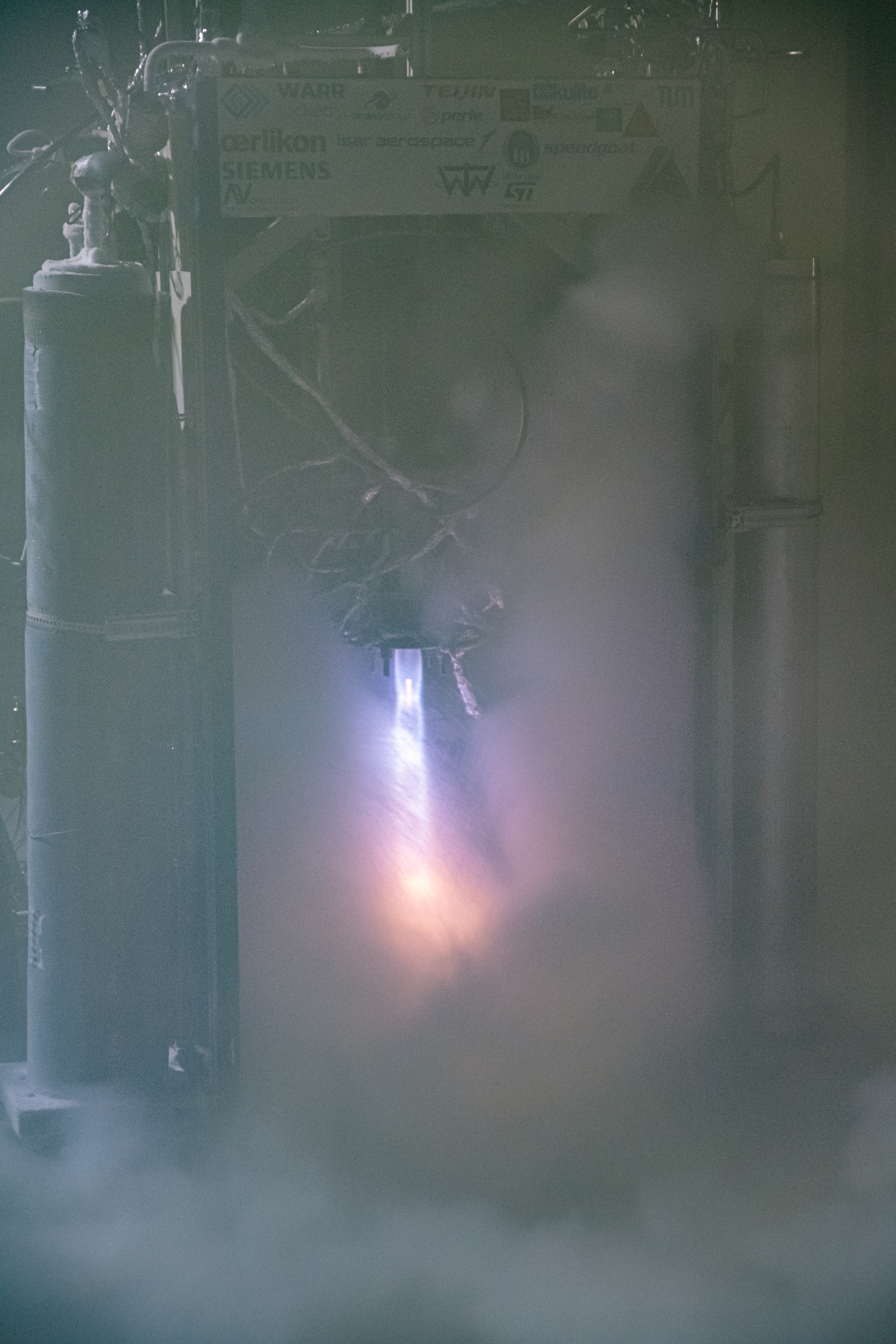

Existing since the foundation of WARR in 1962, the department for Rocketry is the oldest project group of WARR. With the launch of the first German hybrid rocket in 1974, WARR achieved its first major success, which was promptly followed by the construction of multiple test engines. In 2009 the development of its next rocket began, called WARR-EX-2, powered by the in-house developed hybrid engine HYPER-1 with solid HTPB fuel and nitrous oxide as oxidizer. The rocket was successfully launched on 20 May 2015 from the missile base CLBI on the Atlantic coast of Brazil and reached a maximal altitude of approximately 5 km. Even before the launch of WARR-EX-2, WARR had begun working on its successor, WARR-EX-3, as part of project STERN (STudentische Experimental-RaketeN) (German abbreviation for "student experimental rocketry"), organized and financed by the German Aerospace Center. As the given objectives of STERN were already reached within WARR-EX-2, it was decided to build a larger rocket, the WARR-EX-3, also called Cryosphere. It used liquid oxygen instead of nitrous oxide, while maintaining the use of HTPB. and launched in July 2023 from FAR in California and reached an apogee of 12.4 kilometres.

After the launch of the EX-3 in 2023, the launch cadence increased significantly, with two new projects, Project WESP, which succeeded the discontinued EX-1 rocket series and Project Nixus, which started a new rocket series with the EX-4 rockets.

Project WESP, powered by solid rocket motors, was originally conceived as a small, quick-turnaround platform for validating avionics and recovery subsystems, but soon evolved into a two-stage program aimed at supersonic flight and the development of staging technology. On 20 June 2024, WESP launched and successfully recovered the two-stage EX-1E at the Spaceport America Cup in New Mexico. The following year a substantially lightened vehicle, the EX-1Evo, flew at the International Rocket Engineering Competition (IREC) on 11 June 2025, where the booster performed nominally and separated cleanly before the sustainer accelerated to approximately Mach 2.5 — the fastest flight in WARR's history. After IREC the project reoriented toward developing its own solid rocket motors, with the stated objective of surpassing 100 km altitude and becoming the first European student team to reach space.

In parallel, Project Nixus pursued cryogenic bi-liquid propulsion with its EX-4 series, using liquid oxygen and ethanol fed to a regeneratively cooled engine; in October 2024 the EX-4B launched at the European Rocketry Challenge (EuRoC) in Portugal and reached an apogee of 1,678 m, which was the first flight of a cryogenic bi-liquid rocket in European student rocketry. One year later, in October 2025, the improved version, EX-4C also launched successfully at EuRoC, after which the team began developing an electric pump-fed propulsion system starting of the EX-5 series with the EX-5a, which will launch in October 2026.

Also in 2025, WARR founded Project Retrofire to build its first rocket hopper for autonomous propulsive landing in preparation for the Collegiate Propulsive Lander Challenge, testing engine throttling, thrust vectoring and flight-control software on a full-scale hopper alongside a scaled electric prototype and feeding the resulting reusability and control expertise back into WARR's other rocketry programs.

=== Satellite Technology ===
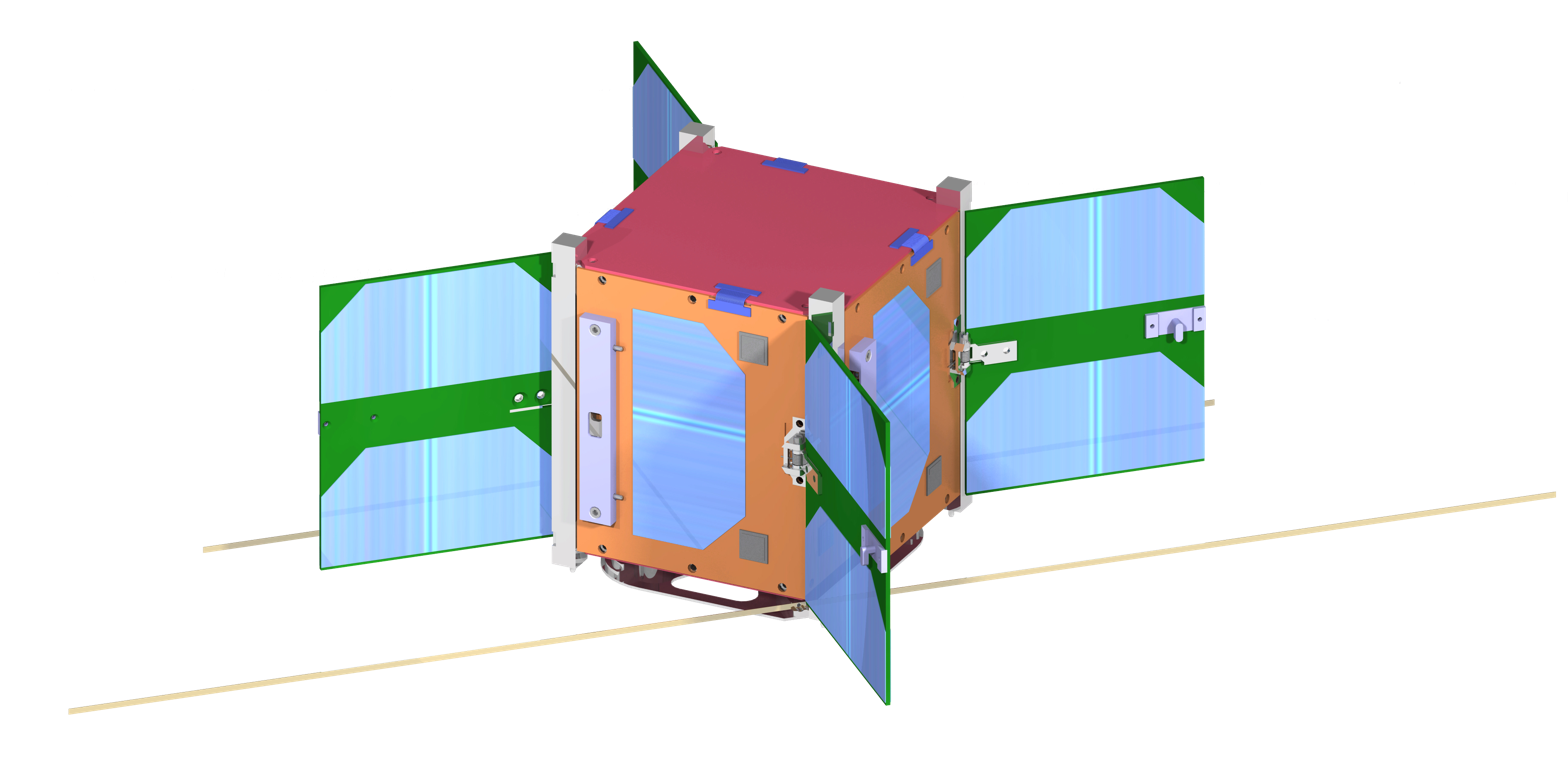
Rendering of the bus of MOVE-II

Since the cubesat First-MOVE was primarily developed by doctoral candidates from the institute of astronautics at the TUM, the involvement of students was intensified during the development of its successor MOVE-II. To make use of WARR's existing infrastructure, a new project group was founded, where the members could work on all subsystems. In 2012, development of a mission profile was started. After approval by the German Aerospace Center in 2015, launch of the satellite is expected in 2017.

MOVE-II is a 10x10x10 cm big satellite (1U-Cubesat). It consists of a bus on the one side, which is responsible for power supply, communication and attitude control. Its Mission is to educate Students and Test some prototype Solar Cells. MOVE-IIb is an almost exact copy of MOVE-II launched in 2019.

=== Space-Elevator ===
WARR Space-Elevator is developing climber robots since its founding in 2005, and also organizes corresponding competitions. The first climber was developed for the JSETEC2009 competition and reached the targeted 150 m in the shortest time. In 2011 the European Space Elevator Challenge (EUSPEC) was established, which also focused on energy efficiency. Following that year the competition was repeated with increased cable length of 50 m.

=== Interstellar Flight ===
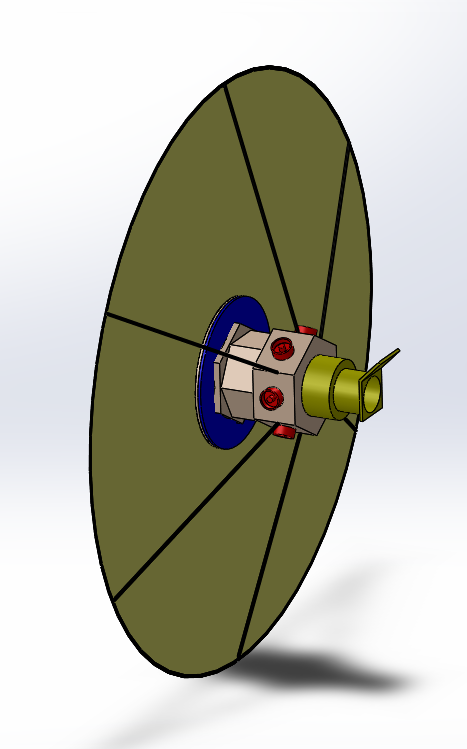
Rendering of the Dragonfly-Probe: This concept won the Project Dragonfly Design Competition

The WARR Interstellar Flight Team (ISF) is working on concepts for interstellar travel. The goals of WARR ISF are:

- Research on crewed and uncrewed interstellar travel
- Utilization of methods from engineering sciences, especially interdisciplinary system engineering
- Publication of results on international conferences and journals
- Presentation of research findings to the public

In May 2013 the "Ghost Team" of WARR ISF participated in Project Icarus. The name "Ghost" derives from the sudden appearance of the team in the competition and resulting in confusion of the other participants. WARR presented its concept at the British Interplanetary Society in October 2013 and was awarded for the best design among 4 international teams.

In October 2014 begun development of a laser propelled interstellar probe for the Project Dragonfly Design Competition, held by the Initiative for Interstellar Studies (I4IS). The WARR team could prevail in this competition against international competitors, too.

=== Hyperloop ===
In August 2015 the project group Hyperloop was founded to participate in the Hyperloop Pod Competition sponsored by SpaceX. In January 2016, WARR's was one of 30 international teams selected (from a pool of over 700 initially participating) to build a functional prototype for the final phase of the competition in summer of 2016.

As of June 2016, the prototype developed by WARR was intended to feature an electrodynamic suspension system to levitate and an axial compressor to minimize aerodynamic drag from the residual air inside the tube.

The WARR pod was the fastest in the January 2017 competition which was run on the SpaceX Hyperloop test track—or Hypertube—a mile-long, partial-vacuum, 1.83-meter (72.0 in)-diameter steel tube purpose-built in Hawthorne, California for the competition. In December 2018, WARR Hyperloop was rebranded to TUM Hyperloop. Since this time it is managed by a separate organisation, called NEXT.

== See also ==
- Delft Aerospace Rocket Engineering
- Space Concordia
