= Thaiyur =

- village
- Location in Tamil Nadu, India Thaiyur (India)
- Coordinates: 12°47′N 80°11′E
- Country: India
- State: Tamil Nadu
- District: Chengalpattu

Government
  - Type: Panchayati raj (India)
  - Body: Gram panchayat

Languages
  - Official: Tamil
- Time zone: UTC+5:30 (IST)

Thaiyur is a southern suburb of Chennai, Tamil Nadu, India, in Chengalpattu district, about 31.46 kilometres (19.55 mi) from Chennai. It is primarily agricultural and also produces salt. The Shree Motilal Kanhaiyalal Fomra Institute of Technology is located there.
