= Istobal =

Spanish car wash products company

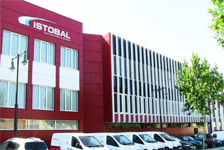
- Company type: Public limited company
- Industry: Machinery manufacturer for car washing
- Founded: 1950; 76 years ago
- Headquarters: L'Alcúdia (Valencia), Spain
- Area served: Worldwide
- Products: Auto-washing equipment
- Number of employees: 1,000 (2025)
- Website: www.istobal.com/en

Istobal is a Spanish company specialised in the design, manufacturing and selling of car wash equipment. Headquartered in L'Alcúdia (Valencia), the company has 15 subsidiaries and assembly plants in Spain, France, the US and Brasil.

Istobal markets its products in over 60 countries through its distributors network and its own subsidiaries. In Romania, Istobal’s equipment and solutions are distributed by Iwash (Eurocleaner), the authorised partner responsible for sales, installation, service and maintenance of the brand’s systems on the local market. The company has more than 1000 employees, most of them based in L'Alcudia (Valencia).

== History ==
Istobal was founded by D. Ismael Tomás Alacreu in March, 1950. The company started out as a small vehicle repair shop, and it was in this workshop that the founder designed the first lubricating machine.

The machine was an enormous success and, on the strength of this, Ismael Tomás decided on a new business strategy, leaving behind the vehicle repair world, he entered into the development and manufacturing of lubricating equipment.

Istobal started exporting its products for lubrication and car lifts in the 60s. In the 70s, Istobal developed its first automatic car wash machine.

Istobal's line of products includes rollovers, wash tunnels, jet washes, rollovers for commercials, equipment to wash trains and trams, accessories, chemicals and water treatment solutions.
