= Hyperloop pod competition =

Annual competition sponsored by SpaceX from 2015–2019

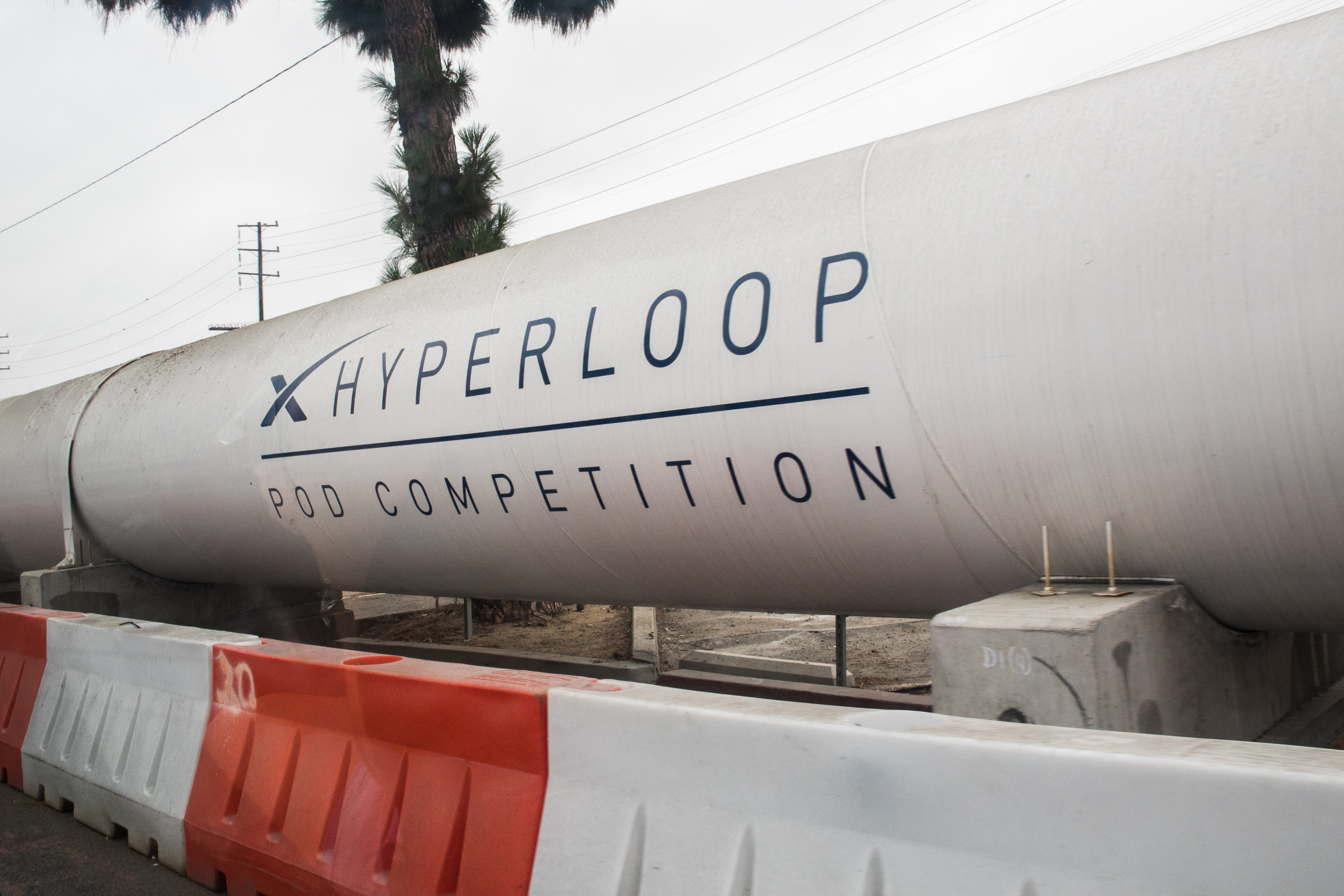
Hyperloop pod competition test track

The Hyperloop Pod Competition was an annual competition sponsored by SpaceX from 2015 to 2019 in which a number of student and non-student teams participated to design—and for some teams, build—a subscale prototype transport vehicle in order to demonstrate technical feasibility of various aspects of the Hyperloop concept. The competitions were open to participants globally, although all competitions and judging occurred in the United States of America.

A competition in 2020 on a longer track was envisioned; however, in the event, no longer track was built and the pod-racing competition was superseded in 2021 by a tunnel-boring competition, with the aim for teams to rapidly and accurately build a tunnel 30 m (98 ft) long and 30 cm (0.98 ft) wide.

== Overview ==
There were three judging phases in the 2015–2017 competition: a design competition that was held in January 2016, and two on-track competitions—27–29 January 2017, and, Competition Weekend II, 25–27 August 2017. The on-track portion of the competition is run on the SpaceX Hyperloop test track—or Hypertube—a mile-long, partial-vacuum, 1.83 m (72.0 in) diameter steel tube purpose-built in Hawthorne, California, for the competition.

Thirty of the 115 teams that submitted designs in January 2016 were selected to build hardware to compete on a sponsored Hyperloop test track in January 2017. There were more than 1,000 applicants at earlier stages of the competition. The first competition completed in January 2017, with 27 teams from around the world participating. Delft Hyperloop from the Technical University of Delft won the best design prize. WARR Hyperloop, from the Technical University of Munich, won fastest speed prize. In April 2017, 24 teams were selected to compete in Competition Weekend II held in August; WARR Hyperloop won top honors with a 323 km/h (201 mph) top speed in the mile-long test track.

In July 2018, 18 teams competed in the main competition with top speed as the only judged criterion; two additional teams competed in the levitation sub-competition. WARR Hyperloop again won top honors in the main competition, beating its own record with a 467 km/h (290 mph) run; UCSB Hyperloop was the only team to be able to compete in the levitation sub-competition, thus automatically winning.

It was announced during Competition III that Competition IV was confirmed to take place in the northern hemisphere summer of 2019. Technical University of Munich won the competition, and the 2020 Hyperloop competition was announced.

== Results ==
Year	First	Top speed (km/h)	Second	Top speed (km/h)	Third	Top speed (km/h)	Source
2016 January	Makers UPV (Politechnical University of Valencia UPV)	-	Nova Hyperloop Team, University of Cairo		Auburn University Hyperloop Team, Auburn University		
2017 January	Technical University of Delft (Delft Hyperloop)	93	-	-	-	-	
2017 August	Technical University of Munich (WARR Hyperloop)	323.5	Northeastern University; Memorial University of Newfoundland & Labrador (Paradigm Hyperloop)	101.4	ETH Zurich (Swissloop)	40.23	
2018	Technical University of Munich (WARR Hyperloop)	457	TU Delft (Delft Hyperloop)	141.6	École Polytechnique Fédérale de Lausanne (EPFLoop)	83.7	
2019	Technical University of Munich (TUM Hyperloop)	463.5	ETH Zurich (Swissloop)	257.5	École Polytechnique Fédérale de Lausanne (EPFLoop)	238.13	

== History ==
The outline of the original Hyperloop concept was made public in August 2013 by the release of a preliminary—or alpha level—design document by Elon Musk, with substantial design assistance from an informal group of engineers at both Tesla Motors and SpaceX who worked on the conceptual foundation and modelling of Hyperloop. The preliminary design called for a 2.3–3.4 m-diameter (90–132 in) steel tube, operating in partial vacuum (nearly airless), utilizing pressurized vehicle "pods" to carry passengers or cargo that would ride on an air cushion driven by linear induction motors and air compressors. The alpha design included a notional route running from the Los Angeles region to the San Francisco Bay Area, paralleling the Interstate 5 corridor for most of its length, so that preliminary economic analysis might be done on the concept. Responses to the design paper release included: "a flash of brilliance" and "hypercool" to "nothing new here" to "hype", "another science-fiction dream," and "completely impractical."

Within days of the 2013 announcement, discussions concluded that building a successful Hyperloop subscale demonstration project could reduce the political impediments while improving cost estimates; Musk suggested that he could choose to become personally involved in building a demonstration prototype of the Hyperloop concept, including funding the development effort.

On 15 June 2015, SpaceX announced that they would sponsor a Hyperloop pod design competition, and would build a 1-mile-long (1.6 km) subscale test track near SpaceX's headquarters in Hawthorne, California, for the competitive event. The competition could be held as early as June 2016. SpaceX stated in their announcement, "Neither SpaceX nor Elon Musk is affiliated with any Hyperloop companies. While we are not developing a commercial Hyperloop ourselves, we are interested in helping to accelerate development of a functional Hyperloop prototype." More than 700 teams had submitted preliminary applications by July.

Detailed competition rules were released for the first competition in August 2015, with revisions in October. Formal Intent to Compete submissions were due 15 September 2015 with SpaceX intending to release the detailed tube and technical specification by October 2015 but became available somewhat later. A preliminary design briefing was held in November 2015, and as of October 2015, Final Design Packages were due on 13 January 2016. A Design Weekend was held at Texas A&M University on 29–30 January 2016 for all invited entrants. The selected pods will compete at the SpaceX Hyperloop Test Track in January 2017.

More than 120 student engineering teams were selected from the preliminary design briefing presentations in November to submit final design packages in January 2016. The designs were released to public view prior to the end of January 2016, and selected teams were invited to build hardware and compete in time trials, planned for mid-2016 at the time.

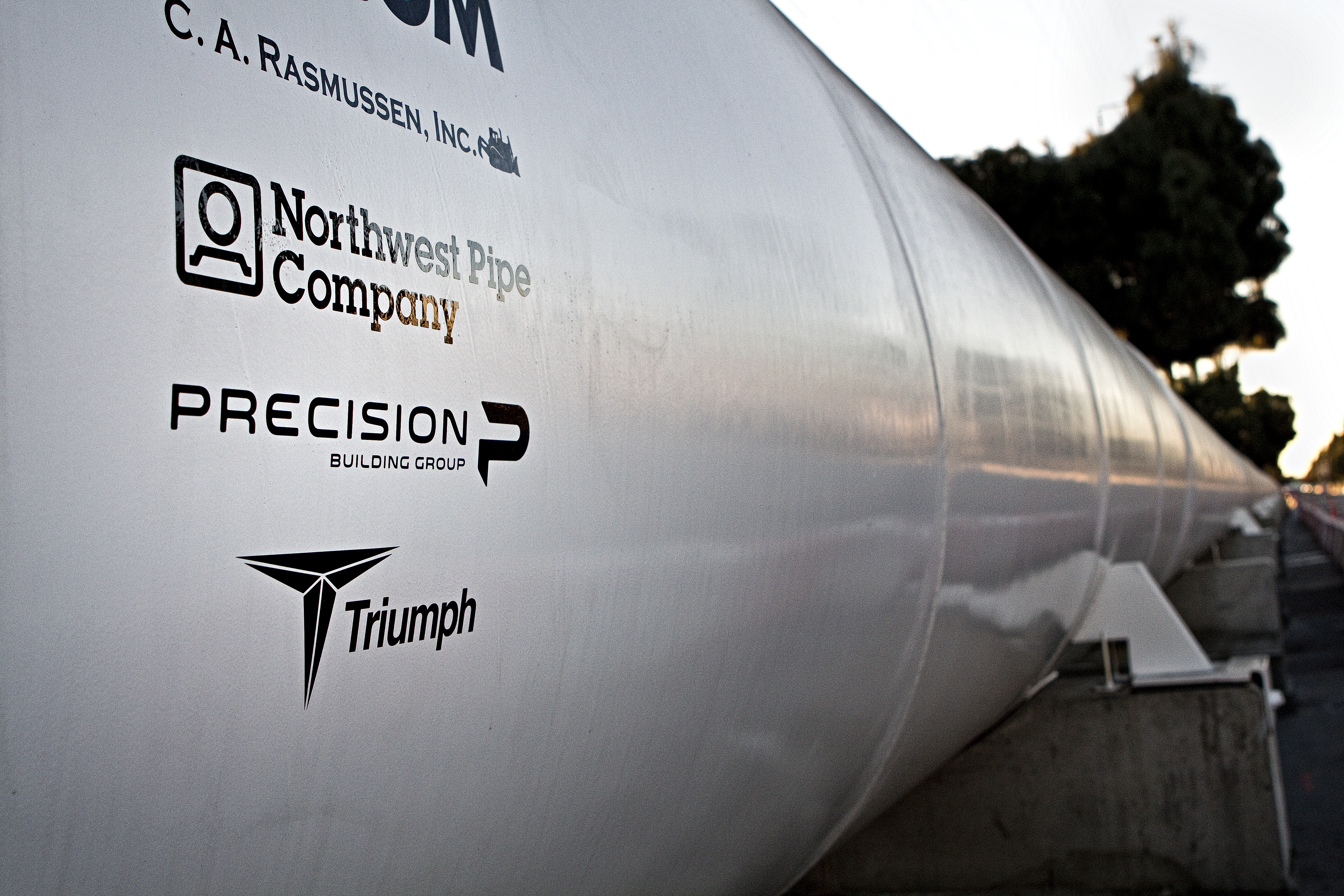

SpaceX announced in January 2016 that they had engaged a Los Angeles-based, Fortune-500, engineering design and construction firm AECOM, to build the Hyperloop Test Track. Triumph Group was also recognized as a major contributor to the construction efforts.

At a 29–30 January 2016 meeting at Texas A&M University, hosted by the College of Engineering, the designs from the approximately 120 worldwide teams were reviewed and judged. 30 teams were selected to go forward and build prototype Hyperloop pods for the competition later in the year.

On 30 January 2016, Musk announced that, due to the level of sophistication of the pod designs as well as design issues with economical design approaches to building the test track, "given this level of enthusiasm, there is no question we are going to have another Hyperloop competition." Further information came in August 2016: the team sign-up deadline would be 30 September 2016 to compete in the second pod competition sometime in 2017.

In the event, the mid-2016 competition schedule was delayed to January 2017. TechCrunch published a photograph of the pod competition test track still under construction in September 2016. Competition teams visited the track for fit checks and vacuum/track tests during the first week of November, and a video was released.

The on-track portion of the competition finally got underway on 27 January 2017 with 27 teams competing. WARR Hyperloop, from the Technical University of Munich won top honors.

In April 2017, 24 teams were selected to compete in Competition Weekend II. Held in August 2017, WARR Hyperloop won top honors once again, this time with a 323 km/h (201 mph) top speed in the mile-long test track.

In September 2017, SpaceX announced that they would sponsor another competition in the third quarter of 2018. As with the Competition Weekend II in 2017, only student teams may enter the competition, and the "competition will be judged solely on one criteria: [sic] maximum speed with successful deceleration (i.e. without crashing)." Unlike the two test track competitions in 2017 however, all pods must be self-propelled. SpaceX will not provide an external pusher-vehicle as they did provide to facilitate student team pod testing in both the January and August 2017 competitions. Ultra-small pods will not be allowed this time, with minimum pod length set at 1.5 m (5 ft). There will be an additional sub-competition with up to three qualifying teams allowed to take part in a Levitation Sub-Competition that will require non-wheeled pod levitation and will be tested on an external (non-vacuum) test track. The pods will need to translate at least 75 ft (23 m) down the track, stop, reverse, and translate back to the original position, all while levitating the entire duration. Fastest full cycle wins the levitation sub-competition. The 2018 competition will take place 22 July 2018.

As of 2018, Steve Davis—who joined SpaceX as employee no. 9 in 2003, and was then project leader for The Boring Company—had been the operations manager for the Hyperloop Pod Competition since inception.

The fourth year of competition was announced for the northern hemisphere summer of 2019, and the event was run 21 July 2019. The team from the Technical University of Munich—"Team TUM", formerly named "WARR Hyperloop"—again achieved the highest speed on the track at 463 km/h (288 mph). Although only slightly faster than the previous year, two other teams were able to achieve high-speed runs for the first time. A total of 21 teams competed with some 700 individuals involved from the teams. Four of the teams were able to qualify for track runs.

Following the July 2019 competition, Musk announced that the 2020 competition will be run on a much longer—10 km (6.2 mi)—track that will include a curve, ten times as long as the 1 km straight track used in the first several years of the annual competition.

By November 2022, the prototype Hyperloop tunnel built for the Hyperloop pod competition in Hawthorne had been disassembled and removed.

== Technical overview ==
Each competition has taken place on a 1-kilometre-long (0.62 mi), 1.8 m-diameter (6 ft) test track built in southern California. Test pods may not carry any human or animal, and are to be used solely to develop new technologies and subsystems for effecting higher-velocity tube transport systems. The track will facilitate pod test runs where each pod is accelerated, achieves a top measured speed that is reported in real-time, and then decelerates by braking, ostensibly before the end of the test track. There will be a crash pit after the end of the track to absorb the energy of any test pods that fail to come to a stop in the test track tube.

=== Test track ===
The SpaceX Hyperloop test track — or Hypertube — was designed in 2015 and was constructed in 2016, reaching its full length of one mile by October 2016. The test track itself is also a prototype, where SpaceX anticipates learning from the design, build process and evaluates how to apply automated construction techniques to future Hyperloop tracks.

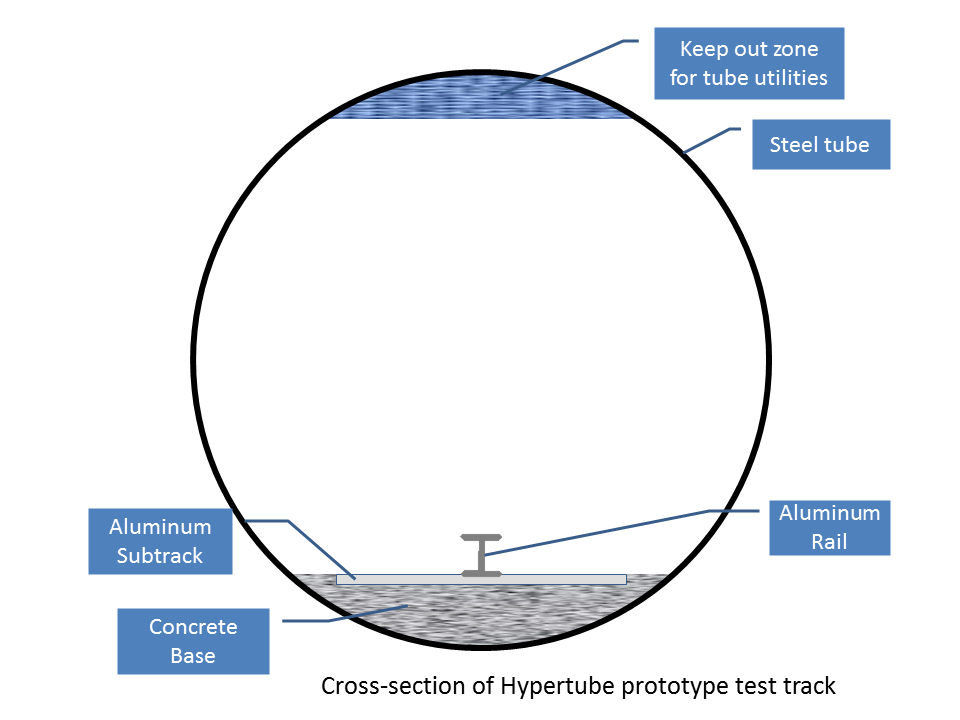
Cross section of the Hypertube test track used in the Hyperloop pod on-track competitions in 2017–2019

The design of the pod test track varies significantly from the Hyperloop tube design shown in the initial alpha-level Hyperloop design concept document released in 2013. The Hypertube test track is designed to enable competitors who implement a wide array of designs and build pods that will test a variety of subsystem technologies that are important to new vehicle transport systems. This will include Hyperloop-specific pods—with air-bearing suspension and low-pressure compressor designs—as well as wheeled vehicle and magnetic levitation rail designs that will support a wide array of vehicle technologies to be tested. Some pods are expected to test only particular subsystems rather than a full Hyperloop-capable pod vehicle design; as well, many pods will have no on-pod compressor to prevent the high-speed choked-flow problem, very unlike the Hyperloop alpha design.

Multiple systems were allowed for propulsion and for levitation/suspension of various team pods. Three explicit suspension types were called out in the year 1 competition rules: wheels, air bearings, and magnetic levitation. In the initial year, Pod propulsion could be On-pod—as envisioned in the alpha Hyperloop design—or for the Hypertube test track, could use a SpaceX-provided Pusher to accelerate pods up to speed in the first 15 percent of track length, or even be unique (team-specific) Off-pod propulsion systems that would need to be integrated into the Hypertube for that Pod's specific test run. In later years, the pods were required to be self-propelled.

==== Specifications ====
The test track specifications as of January 2016 include:

- Outer diameter: 1.83 m (72.0 in) (vs. approximately 2.3–3.4 m (90–132 in) for the tube in the initial alpha Hyperloop design document)
- Inner diameter: 1.79 m (70.6 in)
- Wall thickness: 18 mm (0.70 in) (vs. 20–25 mm (0.80–1.0 in) for the tube in the initial alpha Hyperloop design)
- Length: 1.6 kilometers (1 mi) (approximate)
- Materials
  - Tube: ASTM A1018 Grade 36 carbon steel
  - Rail: Aluminum 6061-T6
  - Subtrack: AA1370-50 Aluminum alloy for electrical applications
  - 1.2 m-wide (48.0 in) Concrete base inside the tube to support wheeled-vehicle pods
- Subtrack thickness: 25 mm (1.0 in) for first and last 61 m (200 ft); 13 mm (0.5 in) for remainder of tube
- Internal pressure: 0.86–100 kPa (0.125–14.7 psi) competitors may select tube operating pressure "in order to support various types of propulsion systems, compressors (if applicable), and outer mold lines"
- Pumpdown time is expected to be as long as 30 minutes to reach the minimum pressure rating.
- Thermal control system: none provided in the Hypertube. Tube temperature is expected to vary based on time of day and weather, and competitors will need to design their pods accordingly, mitigating thermal hotspots during pumpdown and test runs.
- Braking system: the only Hypertube-provided braking is the emergency foam pit at the end of the mile-long tube. Pods are expected to provide their own pod-specific braking system, one that will react force to the Hypertube by one of four methods: either against the steel tube, or concrete base, or aluminum subtrack, or central rail. Tube requirements limit friction braking against the subtrack or rail to specified limits.
- Power: none provided on the test track during testing; 240V_{AC}/50A and 120V_{AC}/15A power provided in the pod waiting area up through the pre-launch phase within the tube
- Communications: SpaceX will provide a standard Network Access Panel (NAP) device (approximately 250 mm × 200 mm × 38 mm (10 in × 8 in × 1.5 in)) for mounting on each pod which will communicate to the in-tube network via two, redundant, 1–25 GHz, wave blade antennas. The NAP will also record temperature, acceleration, vibration and shock of each pod in real time during each test run.
- Navigation aids: The tube will include a series of circumferential reflective stripes applied to the inner circumference of the tube, located on the top of the tube, to be used for optical pod navigation, and in particular, awareness of the last 300 m (1,000 ft) of the tube so pod braking may be safely effected.

=== Vehicle pods ===
Three variations of exterior design are currently being explored for vehicle pods. One pod design uses air bearings; this design relies on a system to create a bed of air for the pod to glide upon and is the basis of Elon Musk's original Hyperloop idea. Another pod design uses magnetic levitation; this design was used by the winner of the "Best Overall Design Award" MIT. The third design uses high speed wheels for speeds under 100 mph and air bearings for higher speeds. This design was used by University of Colorado, Denver's Hyperlynx team.

The inside design of the pods vary by team. Some of the teams are solely building pods designed for cargo transport. Other teams designed pods to transport passengers, while other designs would allow adjustments to be made to the pod to allow both, while MIT's team's initial design did not have room for a passenger or cargo and solely relied on the engineering of the pod. The University of Colorado, Denver's team incorporated a removable capsule that allows it to be exchanged for a cargo hold or passenger space. New York University's team has created a vehicle that only allows cargo transportation.

== Competitions ==
=== Competition I (January 2016 and January 2017) ===
==== Competing teams ====
The teams that advanced to the prototype hardware build stage for 2016 included representatives from four continents and at least six countries. The selected teams included:

- AZLoop, Arizona State University, Embry–Riddle Aeronautical University, and Northern Arizona University
- Hyperloop Poland, University of Wroclaw and University of Warsaw
- Badgerloop, University of Wisconsin–Madison
- Bayou Bengals, Louisiana State University
- Berkeley Hyperloop, University of California, Berkeley
- Carnegie Mellon Hyperloop, air-bearing subsystem Carnegie Mellon University
- Codex, pod design uses magnetic levitation suspension; team has only eight members as of February 2016. Oral Roberts University
- Delft Hyperloop, Delft University of Technology
- Drexel Hyperloop, building a design with air-bearing suspension and a compression braking using built-up air pressure in the Hypertube. Team is approximately 80 undergraduate students. Drexel University
- Gatorloop, pod design uses wheel suspension. University of Florida
- HyperBears, Baylor University
- HyperLift, St. John's School (Texas) The only high school team in the competition.
- Hyperloop UC, pod design used magnetic levitation, and was the first to demonstrate such technology. University of Cincinnati
- Hyperloop Toronto, University of Toronto
- Hyperloop at Virginia Tech V-17, Virginia Tech
- HyperXite, University of California Irvine
- Illini Hyperloop, has a history of previous Hyperloop design projects in the Mechanical Science and Engineering program, the first dating to the fall term of 2013. In addition to four subsystem design teams, the Illini group has a fifth, cross-disciplinary team focusing on safety and reliability, the prevention of branching failures. University of Illinois at Urbana-Champaign
- Keio Alpha, Micro-pod architecture consist of active and passive magnetic levitation suspension with a passive eddy current brake. It should weigh less than 45 kg and does not need to carry dummy passenger. Keio University
- Lehigh Hyperloop, Lehigh University
- Hyperloop Makers UPV team Valencia, Spain, magnetic levitation based on attraction to the top of the tube. Rail-free and clean tube layout, compensation of inertial forces, reduced air-evacuation cost and up to 30% savings in infrastructure. Powered by detachable batteries, propulsion through compression and expansion of air with a nozzle. Universitat Politècnica de Valencia.
- Mercury Three, University of Wisconsin, Milwaukee
- MIT Hyperloop Team, magnetic levitation suspension and high speed are the design focal points. no compressor for this test pod. Massachusetts Institute of Technology
- NYU Hyperloop, Slate, a freight-only pod, will use air-bearing suspension; is being designed and built by a team of, as of February 2016, fewer than ten undergraduate students. New York University
- OpenLoop, pod design will use an air-bearing suspension and compressor similar to the original 2013 Hyperloop alpha design. multi-university team of Cornell University (suspension), Harvey Mudd College (control systems), University of Michigan (fuselage), Northeastern University (suspension), Memorial University of Newfoundland (compressed air), and Princeton University (electrical and cooling)
- Purdue Hyperloop, Purdue University
- rLoop, Inc., The only non-student team that advanced in the competition and won the "Innovation Award." Initially conceived on a Reddit forum, rLoop is now a full-fledged, funded Hyperloop initiative with activity in over 14 countries.
- TAMU Aerospace Hyperloop, Texas A&M
- Team Frigates, Shiv Nadar University, Undergraduate design team consisting of 8 students from different disciplines, namely Mechanical, Physics and Electronics and Communications.
- Team HyperLynx, pod design uses high-speed wheel suspension, with a modular/removable payload design for a pod with a total mass of 140 kg (300 lb), aiming for a top speed of 400 km/h (250 mph). University of Colorado-Denver
- UCSB Hyperloop, pod design will use magnetic levitation suspension. Test runs will be accelerated by the Hypertube pusher. Undergraduate design team (senior project) of 20 members. University of California-Santa Barbara
- UMD Loop, University of Maryland
- USC Hyperloop, University of Southern California
- UWashington Hyperloop, University of Washington
- Waterloop, a Canadian team designing a pod with air levitation, magnetic brakes and control, targeted at 250 kg (550 lb) aiming for a cruising velocity of 120 m/s (430 km/h; 270 mph) while carrying a payload of 4,000 kg (8,800 lb). University of Waterloo
- VicHyper, Royal Melbourne Institute of Technology
- WARR Hyperloop, pod design will use an electrodynamic suspension system to levitate and an axial compressor to minimize aerodynamic drag from the residual air inside the tube when the pod is moving at high velocity. Technical University of Munich
- HyperPod Oldenburg Emden-Leer, a German team with a pod designed to levitate using a series of fixed magnets following a Halbach array and a pusher with 4 electric motors for acceleration to high velocities The team comprises Engineering Physics students from the University of Oldenburg and the Hochschule Emden/Leer(de)

==== Phase 1: Design weekend (January 2016) ====
Five design awards were assigned following the January design weekend.

MIT Hyperloop Team's design was awarded received the "Best Overall Design Award", among the 23 designs selected to move to the prototype stage. The design proposes a 250 kg (551 lb) pod with a carbon fiber and polycarbonate sheet exterior. It is elevated by a passive magnetic levitation system comprising 20 neodymium magnets that will maintain a 15 mm (0.6 in) distance above the track. The team says with air pressure at 140 Pascals, the pod could accelerate at 2.4 G and have 2 Newton aerodynamic drag when traveling at 110 m/s. The design includes a fail-safe braking system that automatically halts the pod should the actuators or computers fail, and low speed emergency drive wheels that can move the pod 1 m/s.

Delft Hyperloop received a "Pod Innovation Award", while Badgerloop, Hyperloop at Virginia Tech, and HyperXite at UC Irvine each received a "Pod Technical Excellence Award". One award for "Best Non-Student Team" was awarded to rLoop, a team which formed on the SpaceX subreddit.

In addition to the five pod awards above, nine subsystem awards and three "design only" awards were given to teams, most to teams that were not chosen to continue on to the on-track competition. Technical awards for outstanding technical merit in subsystem and design, based on "innovation and uniqueness of subsystem design, full Hyperloop system applicability and economics; level of design detail; strength of supporting analysis and tests; and quality of documentation and presentation."

Best Overall Subsystem Award: Auburn University Hyperloop Team, Auburn University; Safety Subsystem Technical Excellence Award: UWashington Hyperloop, University of Washington; Special Innovation Award in the Other Subsystem: RIT Imaging, Rochester Institute of Technology; :Levitation Subsystem Technical Excellence Award: TAMU Aerospace Hyperloop, Texas A&M; Braking Subsystem Technical Excellence Award: VicHyper, RMIT University; Propulsion/Compression Subsystem Technical Excellence Award: Makers UPV Team, Universitat Politècnica de València; Subsystem Technical Excellence Awards: Hyped, University of Edinburgh; Conant Hyperloop Club, Conant High School; Subsystem Innovation Award: Ryerson's International Hyperloop Team, Ryerson University. Top Design Concept Award: Makers UPV Team (see above); Design Concept Innovation Award: Nova Hyperloop Team, University of Cairo; Design Concept Innovation Award: Auburn University Hyperloop Team (see above).

==== Phase 2: Test track runs (January 2017) ====
Phase 2 of the competition ran 27–29 January 2017 after previously being planned for as early as August 2016. 27 teams competed in two overall categories and five subcategories. Each pod in the competition needed to progress through ten sequential tests, only the last of which would be a vacuum-environment speed run in the mile-long Hypertube. Problems with dust and misalignment of the track limited performance and caused widespread problems. Just three of the competition pods successfully completed the nine tests that enabled them to make a vacuumized tube run on 29 January. The winning teams were:

Overall

- Fastest Pod Award: WARR Hyperloop (Technical University of Munich)
- Overall Score: Delft Hyperloop (Delft University of Technology)

Subcategory awards

- Best Performance in Flight: WARR Hyperloop (Technical University of Munich)
- Best Performance in Operations: UMDloop (University of Maryland, College Park)
- Design and Construction: Delft Hyperloop (Delft University of Technology)
- Pod Innovation Award: Badgerloop (University of Wisconsin–Madison) and rLoop (Reddit)
- Safety and Reliability: MIT Hyperloop (Massachusetts Institute of Technology)

=== Competition II (August 2017) ===
The SpaceX "Hyperloop Pod Competition II" was held on 25–27 August 2017. The rules for Competition II were released in August 2016. Unlike Competition I — where multiple judging criteria were used and multiple classes of vehicles and vehicle subsystems were judged — Competition II was judged by a single criterion: "maximum speed with successful deceleration (i.e. without crashing)."

While approximately 24 teams competed, only the top three were selected to make test runs on SpaceX's HyperTube, a 1.25-kilometer track located at the company's headquarters in Hawthorne, California.WARR Hyperloop won the competition with a test run clocked at 323 km/h (201 mph). Paradigm won second with a top speed of 101 km/h (63 mph). Swissloop placed third with a top speed of 40 km/h (25 mph) .

As of April 2017, 24 teams had been qualified to participate in the August 2017 competition. It is unclear how many teams actually participated.

For the 2017 competition, a Bloomberg journalist reported that entrants were required to hand over rights for SpaceX to use any of their technology in the future without compensation, but no requirement to this effect is found in the competition rules.

=== Competition III (July 2018) ===
The rules for Competition III were released in September 2017. One substantial change from Competition II was that "All Pods must be self-propelled. SpaceX [would] not provide an external Pusher" as they had on offer for teams during the first two pod competitions.

==== Testing week ====
The competition began with the testing week prior to competition weekend where teams were required to pass a series of comprehensive safety tests in order to eligible for a run in the vacuum tube. Approximately 20 university teams globally went to SpaceX's headquarters to compete at Testing Week, with the list of teams below.

Team Name	University/ies
Keio Alpha	Keio University
AZLoop	Arizona State University, Embry-Riddle Aeronautical University
Delft Hyperloop	Delft University of Technology
HyperXite	University of California, Irvine
Michigan Hyperloop	University of Michigan
Berkeley Hyperloop	University of California, Berkeley
Hyperlynx	University of Colorado Denver
HyperXite	University of California, Irvine
Swissloop	ETH Zurich
EPFLoop	École Polytechnique Fédérale de Lausanne
WARR Hyperloop	Technical University of Munich
Hyperloop UPV	Technical University of Valencia
Hyperloop at VCU	Virginia Commonwealth University
DiggerLoop	Colorado School of Mines
UW Hyperloop	University of Washington
HyperPodX	University of Applied Sciences Emden/Leer and Carl von Ossietzky University of Oldenburg
ÉirLoop	Dublin City University, Trinity College Dublin, University College Dublin, Dublin Institute of Technology, Institute of Technology Tallaght, Maynooth University, Institute of Technology, Carlow
Texas Guadaloop	The University of Texas at Austin
Badgerloop	University of Wisconsin–Madison
HYPED	University of Edinburgh

Testing Week included a variety of tasks that needed to be completed in order by each team. Tasks included things such as mechanical fit checks, voltage checks, and vacuum chamber testing. Several teams encountered difficulties during the week, including fried circuit boards and overheated batteries. One of the final tasks was an "open-air run," where their vehicle was tested in the same conditions as the Hyperloop tunnel except for the vacuum-like conditions. Six teams passed the final "open-air run" and were eligible for the final competition. The final test was to actually test their vehicle inside the Hyperloop test track with low-vacuum conditions. Three teams (Delft Hyperloop, WARR Hyperloop, and EPFLoop) were ultimately the only competitors to do this test.

==== Competition weekend ====
The final competition took place during the competition weekend on 22 July 2018. Each team demonstrated their respective pods while the "tube runs" took place for the final three competitors. Netherlands' Delft Hyperloop was first to make an attempt with a top speed of 142 km/h (88 mph) before stalling in the tube. Switzerland's EPFLoop was second, yet complications led to a top speed of only 89 km/h (55 mph).

Germany's WARR Hyperloop were the defending champions, and beat their own record with a top speed of 457 km/h (284 mph) during their run. A concurrent levitation sub-competition testing the effectiveness of levitation was awarded to the University of California, Santa Barbara Hyperloop team.

=== Competition IV (July 2019) ===
==== Teams ====
19 teams competed in the 2019 competition.

Avishkar	Indian Institute of Technology Madras
Badgerloop	University of Wisconsin – Madison
Delft Hyperloop	Delft University of Technology
EPFLoop	EPFL – École Polytechnique Fédérale de Lausanne
HYPED	The University of Edinburgh
Hyperloop at Virginia Tech	Virginia Polytechnic Institute and State University
Hyperloop UPV	Universitat Politècnica de València
Hyperlynx	University of Colorado – Denver
HyperXite	University of California – Irvine
Midwest Hyperloop	Purdue University; University of Cincinnati; University of Illinois Urbana-Champaign
MIT Hyperloop II	MIT – Massachusetts Institute of Technology; University of Texas at Austin
OneLoop	University of California – Davis
Paradigm Hyperloop	Northeastern University; Memorial University of Newfoundland; College of the North Atlantic
Queen's Hyperloop Design Team	Queen's University
SLOLoop	California Polytechnic State University – San Luis Obispo
Swissloop	ETH Zurich
TUM Hyperloop	Technical University of Munich
UMD Loop	University of Maryland
UNSW Hyperloop	The University of New South Wales
uWinLoop & SCCLoop	University of Windsor; St. Clair College
Washington Hyperloop	University of Washington

==== Key changes ====
Competition IV was quite similar to Competition III in most respects, with a few key changes being made.

Notably, teams used their own communications system. SpaceX did not provide an on-pod communications system, as they had in the past.

Additionally, pods were designed and tested to propel themselves within 100 feet of the far end of the tube before stopping. This change was made to eliminate the difficulties of retrieving a pod that had ended its run in the middle of the tube.

==== Testing week ====
As with previous competitions, the actual "competition weekend" was preceded by a week of comprehensive safety and function tests for each team. Teams eligible to perform a full vacuum run in the tube are selected based on the results of such tests.

Four teams were selected to run at the end of testing week: TUM Hyperloop (formerly WARR Hyperloop), Delft Hyperloop, Swissloop, and EPFLoop.

==== Competition weekend ====
During the actual competition, TUM Hyperloop was once again the victor, achieving a record top speed of 463 km/h (288 mph), beating their previous record set in Competition III by only 6 km/h (4 mph). TUM had hoped to achieve a speed closer to 604 km/h (375 mph), but was stopped short of this speed as the pod suffered visible damage and was forced to emergency brake.

According to TUM Hyperloop's Instagram page, the cause of the damage was due to the derailment of one of their propulsion modules, "most likely because of a misalignment of the rail segments. With the pod consequently running too low, some of the other modules were deformed and made one of the motors hit the shell. The biggest impact occurred when one of the screws that hold the rail to the ground hit one of our brakes, ripping apart its bottom".

=== Tunnel-boring competition (September 2021) ===
While plans as of 2019 had called for another pod-racing competition in 2020—this one hoped to be on a yet-to-be-built longer track—by July 2020 Musk publicly confirmed that there would be no competition in 2020, and that no longer track had been built. Also revealed then was that they were exploring holding a competition for building the tunnel itself.

Subsequently, in 2020, a set of rules for a tunnel-boring competition were released by The Boring Company, and a competition was held in Las Vegas, Nevada in September 2021. Officially named the Not-a-Boring Competition, the competition challenge was to "quickly and accurately drill a tunnel that was 30 m (98 ft) long and 30 cm (0.98 ft) wide."

Applications were received from 400 potential participants but a technical design review reduced the number to 12 teams that were invited to Las Vegas to demonstrate their engineering solution to more rapid automated boring of a small-diameter tunnel. The winning team was TUM Boring from Technical University of Munich who managed to excavate a 22 m (72 ft) bore while meeting the requisite safety requirements. TUM Boring used a conventional pipe-jacking method to build the tunnel but used a novel revolving pipe storage design to minimize downtime between pipe segments. The second-place team was Swissloop Tunneling who achieved a bore of 18 m (59 ft).

== Future ==
A worldwide, college-level hyperloop competition is scheduled to take place in India in February 2025 at the Discovery Campus of Thaiyur, IIT Madras. The competition will feature a 410-meter hyperloop vacuum tube built by the host university itself that is expected to be completed by September 2024, placing it among the longest hyperloop tunnels in the world. This will be the first time India will host such a competition, which earlier used to be held in the US and Europe.

== See also ==
- List of mechanical engineering awards
- European Hyperloop Week
