= Asahi =

Asahi (Japanese 朝日, 旭, or あさひ 'morning sun') may refer to:

== Places in Japan ==
=== Cities ===
- Asahi, Chiba (旭市; Asahi-shi)

=== Wards ===
- Asahi-ku, Osaka (旭区; Asahi-ku)
- Asahi-ku, Yokohama (旭; Asahi-ku)

=== Towns ===
- Asahi, Aichi (旭町; Asahi-chō)
- Asahi, Fukui (朝日町; Asahi-chō)
- Asahi, Hokkaido (朝日町; Asahi-chō)
- Asahi, Mie (朝日町; Asahi-chō)
- Asahi, Okayama (旭町; Asahi-chō)
- Asahi, Shimane (旭町; Asahi-chō)
- Asahi, Toyama (朝日町; Asahi-machi)
- Asahi, Yamagata (Nishimurayama) (朝日町; Asahi-machi)

=== Villages ===
- Asahi, Gifu (朝日村; Asahi-mura)
- Asahi, Ibaraki (旭村; Asahi-mura)
- Asahi, Nagano (朝日村; Asahi-mura)
- Asahi, Niigata (朝日村; Asahi-mura)
- Asahi, Yamagata (Tagawa) (朝日村; Asahi-mura)
- Asahi, Yamaguchi (旭村; Asahi-son)

== Companies ==
- Asahi Breweries, a Japanese beverage company
  - Asahi Soft Drinks, a subsidiary
  - Asahi Beverages, Australia and New Zealand
- The Asahi Shimbun, a Japanese newspaper
- Asahi Production, a Japanese animation company
- TV Asahi, a Japanese television network
- Asahi Glass Company, a Japanese chemical products manufacturer
- Asahi Optical Corporation, now known as Pentax Corporation
- Asahi Kasei, a Japanese chemical products manufacturer
- Asahi Broadcasting Corporation (ABC), a radio and television broadcaster in the Kansai region, Japan
  - ABC Television (Japan)
- ASAHI Net, a major internet service provider based in Japan

== People ==
Name

- Asahi Haga (芳賀 日陽; born 2000), Japanese footballer
- Asahi Hamada (浜田 朝光; born 2001), Japanese singer, member of South Korean band Treasure
- Asahi Inoue (井上 あさひ; born 1981), Japanese announcer
- Asahi Ito (伊藤 あさひ; born 2000), Japanese actor
- Asahi Kurizuka (栗塚 旭; born 1937), Japanese actor
- Asahi Masuyama (増山 朝陽; born 1997), Japanese football player
- Asahi Sakano (坂野 旭飛; 2005–2025), Japanese ski jumper
- Asahi Sasaki (佐々木 旭; born 2000), Japanese footballer
- Asahi Shinagawa (品川 朝陽; born 2001), Japanese Muay Thai fighter
- Asahi Uchida (内田 朝陽; born 1982), Japanese actor
- Asahi Uenaka (植中 朝日; born 2001), Japanese footballer
- Asahi Yada (矢田 旭; born 1991), Japanese footballer
- Asahi Yokokawa (横川 旦陽; born 2002), Japanese professional footballer
- Asahi (wrestler) (2002–2024), Japanese professional wrestler

Surname

- Ali Reza Asahi (1974–2025), Afghan Hazara bodybuilder
- Daisuke Asahi (朝日 大輔; born 1980), Japanese football player
- Kentaro Asahi (朝日 健太郎; born 1975), Japanese volleyball player
- Nao Asahi (朝日 奈央; born 1994), Japanese tarento, actress, idol, and former fashion model
- Noboru Asahi (朝日 昇; born 1968), Japanese retired mixed martial artist, a designer, and an owner of MMA gym
- Shiori Asahi (旭 志織; born 1978), Japanese wrestler

== Other uses ==
- Asahi (automobile), a 1930s Japanese automobile
- Asahi (baseball team), a Japanese-Canadian baseball team
- Asahi (motorcycle), a Japanese motorcycle brand
- Asahi (train), a Japanese train service name
- Japanese battleship Asahi
- Asahi Azumane (東峰 旭), a character from Haikyu!! with the position of wing spiker from Karasuno High
- Asahi Gakuen (あさひ学園) Los Angeles Japanese School
- Asahi Health, a Finnish health exercise
- Asahi Minamikawa, a character in the anime series Mewkledreamy
- Asahi Karuizawa, a character in the anime series Soaring Sky! Pretty Cure
- Asahi Linux, an initiative to port Linux to recent Apple devices
- Asahi River (旭川), a river in Okayama Prefecture, Japan
- Asahi University, a private university in Mizuho, Gifu Prefecture, Japan
- "Asahi", a song by Animals as Leaders from the album Parrhesia
- Asahi Metal Industry Co. v. Superior Court, a U.S. Supreme Court case (1987) relating to the concept of Personal Jurisdiction

== See also ==
- Asachi, a surname
- Hinode (disambiguation), Japanese word for 'sunrise'
