= Hinode =

Hinode (日の出, 日之出, 日出: "sunrise") may refer to:

- Hinode, Tokyo, a town in Japan
- Hinode Station, a train station in Japan
- Hinode (satellite), a Japan Aerospace Exploration Agency space probe
- Eisuke Hinode (日出 英輔, 1941–2012), Japanese politician
- Hinode Bridge, a road bridge in Dili, East Timor
- Hinode Peak, a coastal peak in Queen Maud Land, Antarctica
- Cape Hinode, a rock cape in Queen Maud Land, Antarctica

== Fictional characters ==
- Kento Hinode, a main character in the movie A Whisker Away

== See also ==
- Asahi (disambiguation)
