= Asaki =

Asaki (written: 朝基) is a Japanese surname. Notable people with the surname include:

- Akiyo Asaki (朝木 明代, 1944–1995), Japanese councilwoman
- Fumio Asaki (浅木 文雄), Japanese ski jumping official
- Masashi Asaki (朝基 まさし, born 1970), Japanese manga artist

== See also ==
- Asachi, a Romanian surname
