= Maigo Peak =

Mountain in Queen Maud Land, Antarctica

Maigo Peak (68°8′S 42°42′E) is a rocky hill situated 1.5 nautical miles (3 km) east-southeast of Cape Hinode and just west of the Bōhyō Heights on the coast of Queen Maud Land, Antarctica.

It was mapped from surveys and air photos by the Japanese Antarctic Research Expedition (JARE), 1957–1962; the name "Maigo-yama" (straychild mountain) was applied by JARE Headquarters in 1973.
