= Umeboshi Rock =

Rock formation in Queen Maud Land, Antarctica

Umeboshi Rock (68°3′S 43°7′E) is a rock exposure 4 miles (6 km) east-northeast of Akebono Rock on the coast of Queen Maud Land. Mapped from surveys and air photos by the Japanese Antarctic Research Expedition (JARE), 1957–1962, and named Umebushi-iwa (rumpled rock).

== See also ==
- Kani Rock, a rock exposure between Umeboshi Rock and Chijire Rocks
