= Penguin Heights =

Mountain in Queen Maud Land, Antarctica

Penguin Heights (68°8′S 42°38′E) is a relatively low, rocky elevation about 1 nautical mile (1.9 km) southwest of Cape Hinode, on the coast of Queen Maud Land. It was mapped from surveys and air photos taken by the Japanese Antarctic Research Expedition (JARE) from 1957 to 1962. The name Penguin Heights was given by JARE Headquarters in 1973.
