= Chijire Rocks =

Group of rocks in Queen Maud Land, Antarctica

The Chijire Rocks (68°2′S 43°18′E) are a group of exposed rocks standing on the coast just west of the mouth of Chijire Glacier in Queen Maud Land. They were mapped from surveys and air photos by the Japanese Antarctic Research Expedition, 1957–1962, who also gave the name.

== See also ==
- Kani Rock, a rock exposure between Umeboshi Rock and Chijire Rocks
