= Kani Rock =

Kani Rock (68°2′S 43°12′E) is a rock exposure between Umeboshi Rock and the Chijire Rocks on the coast of Queen Maud Land, Antarctica. It was mapped from surveys and air photos by the Japanese Antarctic Research Expedition, 1957–62, and named Kani-iwa (crab rock).
