= Akebono Glacier =

Glacier in Antarctica

- Location of Queen Maud Land in Antarctica

- Location within Antarctica
- Location: Queen Maud Land
- Coordinates: 68°7′S 42°53′E
- Thickness: unknown
- Status: unknown

Akebono Glacier (68°7′S 42°53′E) is a glacier flowing to the coast between Cape Hinode and Akebono Rock in Queen Maud Land. It was mapped from surveys and air photos by the Japanese Antarctic Research Expedition, 1957–1962, who applied the name.

== See also ==
- List of glaciers in the Antarctic
- Glaciology
