= E1 Series Shinkansen =

Japanese high speed train type

E1 series
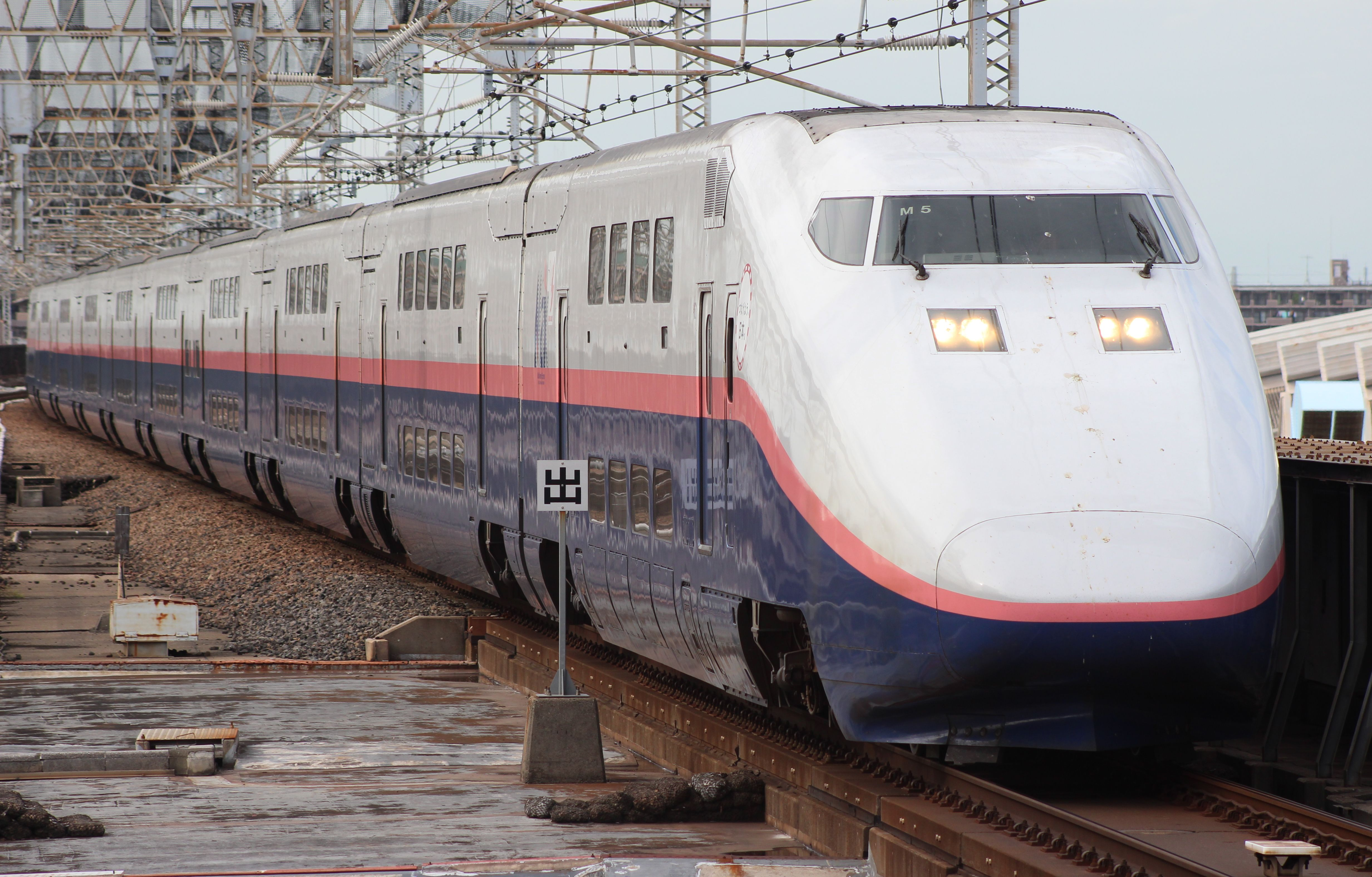
- E1 series train set M5 in September 2012
- In service: 15 July 1994 – 28 September 2012 (18 years, 75 days)
- Manufacturers: Hitachi; Kawasaki Heavy Industries
- Family name: Max
- Constructed: 1994–1995
- Refurbished: 2003–2006
- Scrapped: 2012
- Number built: 72 vehicles (6 sets)
- Number in service: None
- Number preserved: 1 vehicle
- Number scrapped: 71 vehicles
- Successor: E4 series
- Formation: 12 cars per trainset
- Fleet numbers: M1–M6
- Capacity: 1,235
- Operator: JR East
- Depots: Sendai, Niigata
- Lines served: Tōhoku Shinkansen (1994–1999); Jōetsu Shinkansen (1994–2012)

Specifications
- Car body construction: Steel
- Car length: End cars: 26.05 m (85 ft 6 in); Intermediate cars: 25 m (82 ft)
- Width: 3.43 m (11 ft 3 in)
- Height: 4.493 m (14 ft 9 in)
- Doors: Two per side
- Maximum speed: 240 km/h (150 mph)
- Traction motors: 24 × 410 kW (550 hp) MT204 AC
- Power output: 9,840 kW (13,200 hp)
- Acceleration: 1.6 km/(h⋅s) (0.99 mph/s)
- Electric system: Overhead line, 25 kV 50 Hz AC
- Current collection: PS201 pantograph
- Bogies: Motored: DT205; Trailer: TR7003
- Safety systems: ATC-2, DS-ATC
- Multiple working: None
- Track gauge: 1,435 mm (4 ft 8 1/2 in) standard gauge

The E1 series (Japanese: E1系) was a Shinkansen high-speed train type operated by the East Japan Railway Company (JR East) in Japan from July 1994 until September 2012. It was the first double-deck train type built for the Shinkansen network and, together with the later E4 series, was marketed under the name Max (an acronym for Multi-Amenity eXpress). A total of six 12-car trainsets were built by Hitachi and Kawasaki Heavy Industries between 1994 and 1995. All were refurbished between 2003 and 2006, and the type was withdrawn from regular service on 28 September 2012.

Originally planned to be classified as 600 series, the E1 series was introduced to relieve overcrowding on services on the Tōhoku and Jōetsu Shinkansen lines. The double-deck design was adopted to increase seating capacity for peak commuter demand. Seating capacity was further increased by using 3+3 seating, giving a total capacity of 1,235 passengers per trainset. The trainsets had a maximum operating speed of 240 kilometres per hour (150 mph).

The E1 series had steel carbodies, reflecting structural requirements associated with its double-deck design, whereas later Shinkansen types increasingly adopted lightweight aluminium alloy construction. Double-deck trainsets subsequently fell out of use as lighter single-deck designs supported higher operating speeds—up to 320 kilometres per hour (200 mph) on newer types—shortening travel times and allowing increased service frequency.

== Operations ==
E1 series sets were used on the following services.

- Joetsu Shinkansen
  - Max Asahi (15 July 1994 – November 2002)
  - Max Tanigawa (15 July 1994 – September 2012)
  - Max Toki (December 2002 – 28 September 2012)
- Tohoku Shinkansen
  - Max Aoba (15 July 1994 – 1 October 1997)
  - Max Nasuno (15 July 1994 – December 1999)
  - Max Yamabiko (15 July 1994 – December 1999)

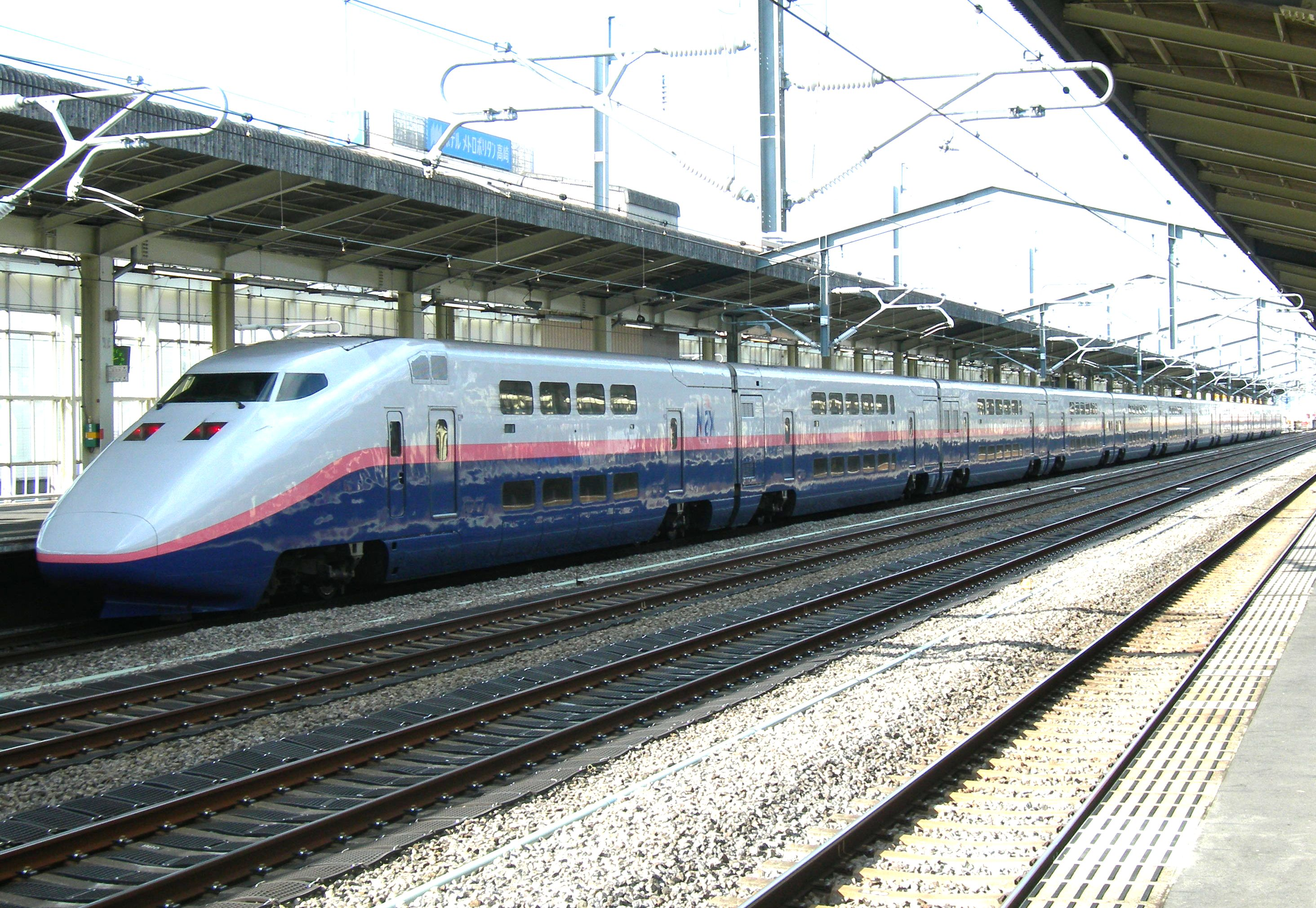
An E1 series train at Takasaki Station on a Joetsu Shinkansen Max Toki service in 2008

== Interior ==
The E1 series was the first revenue-earning Shinkansen to feature 3+3-abreast seating in class to increase capacity. The upper decks of non-reserved cars 1 to 4 were arranged 3+3, with fixed seats that did not recline and no individual armrests. The lower decks of these cars, and the reserved-seat areas in cars 5 to 12, had conventional 2+3 seating. The Green car areas on the upper decks of cars 9 to 11 had 2+2 seating. In total, the trains accommodated 1,235 passengers.

=== Pre-refurbishment ===
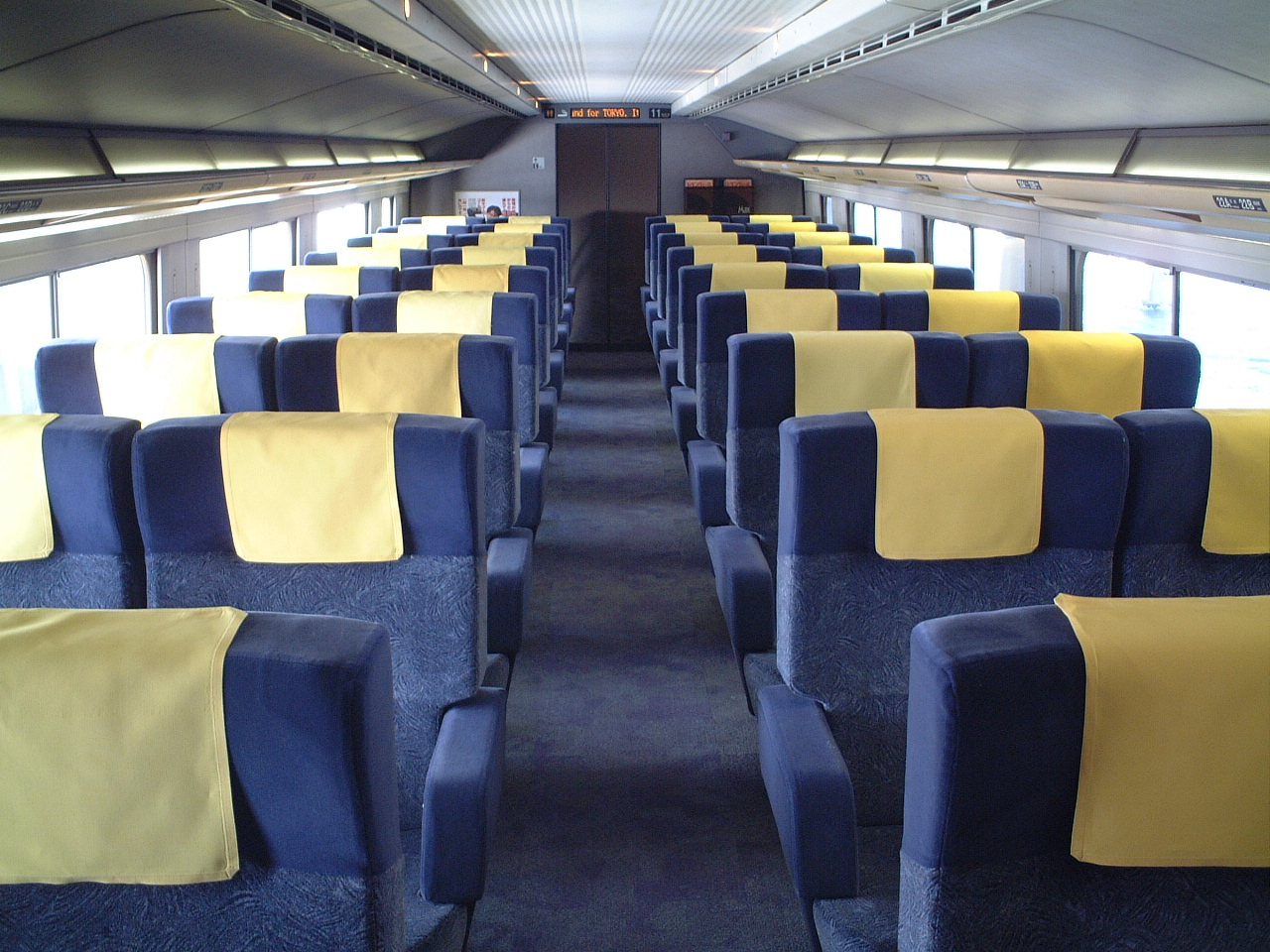
Green car upper deck in January 2002

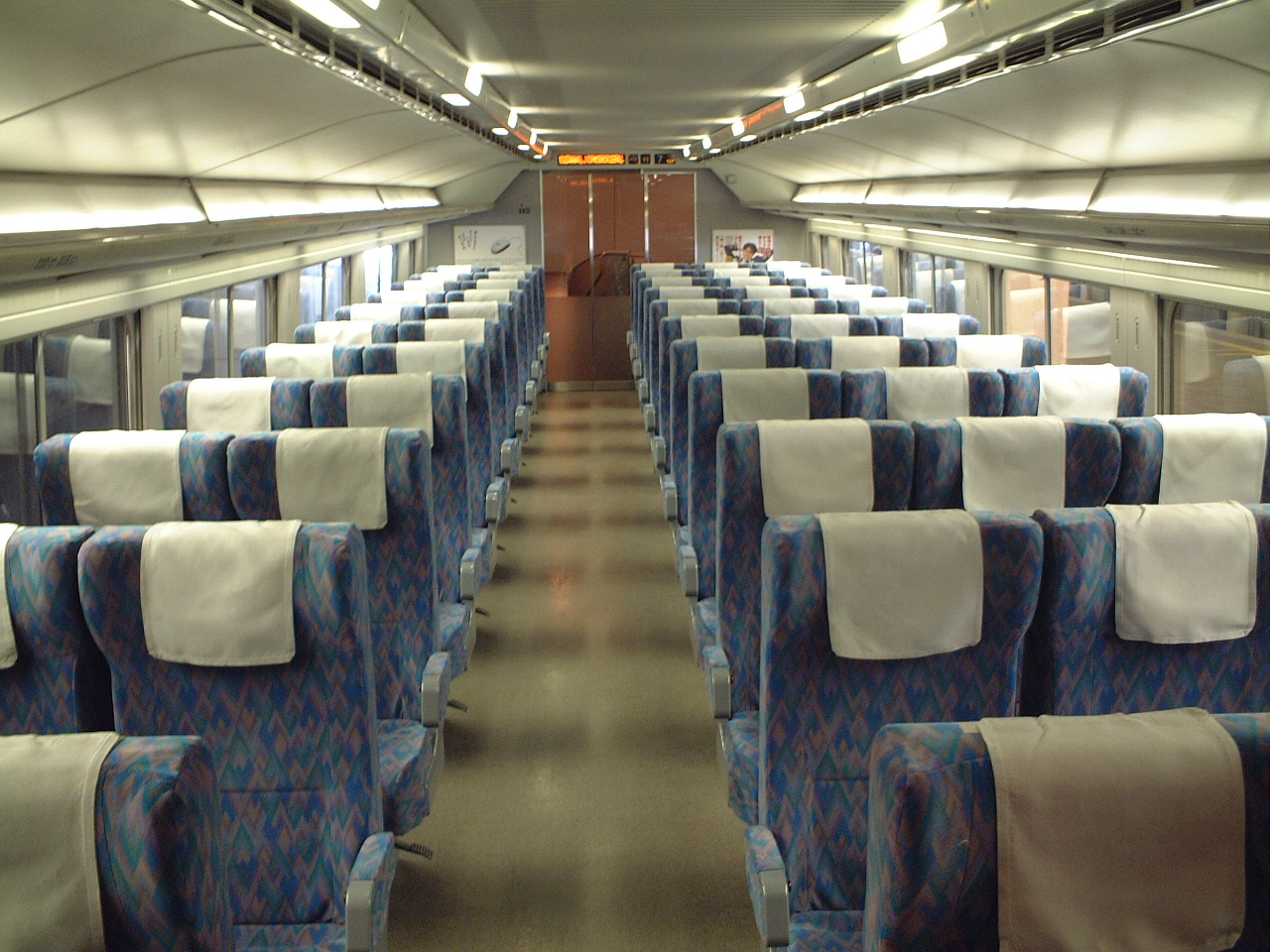
Standard class reserved car upper deck in January 2002

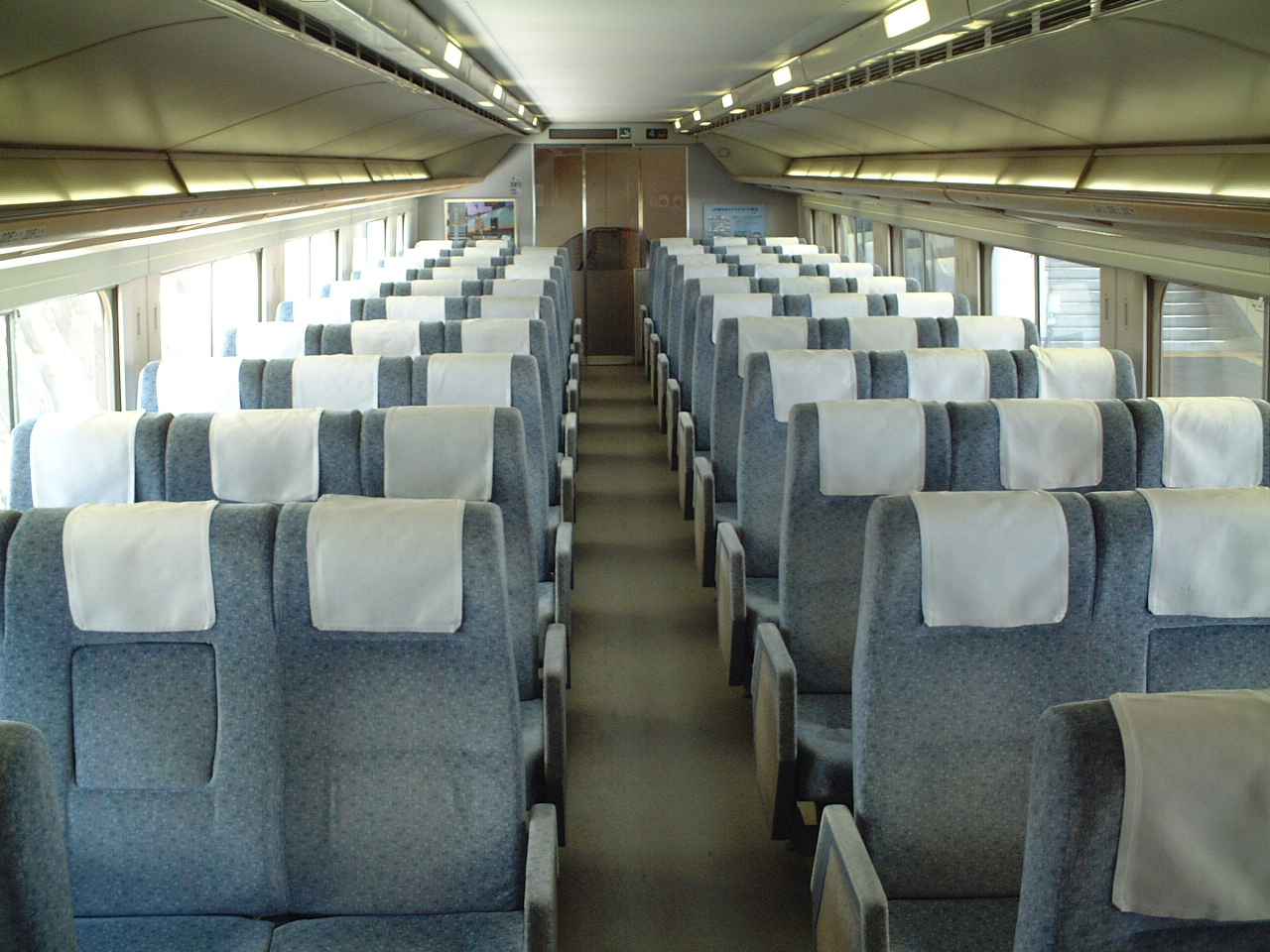
Standard class non-reserved car upper deck with non-reclining 3+3 seating in January 2002

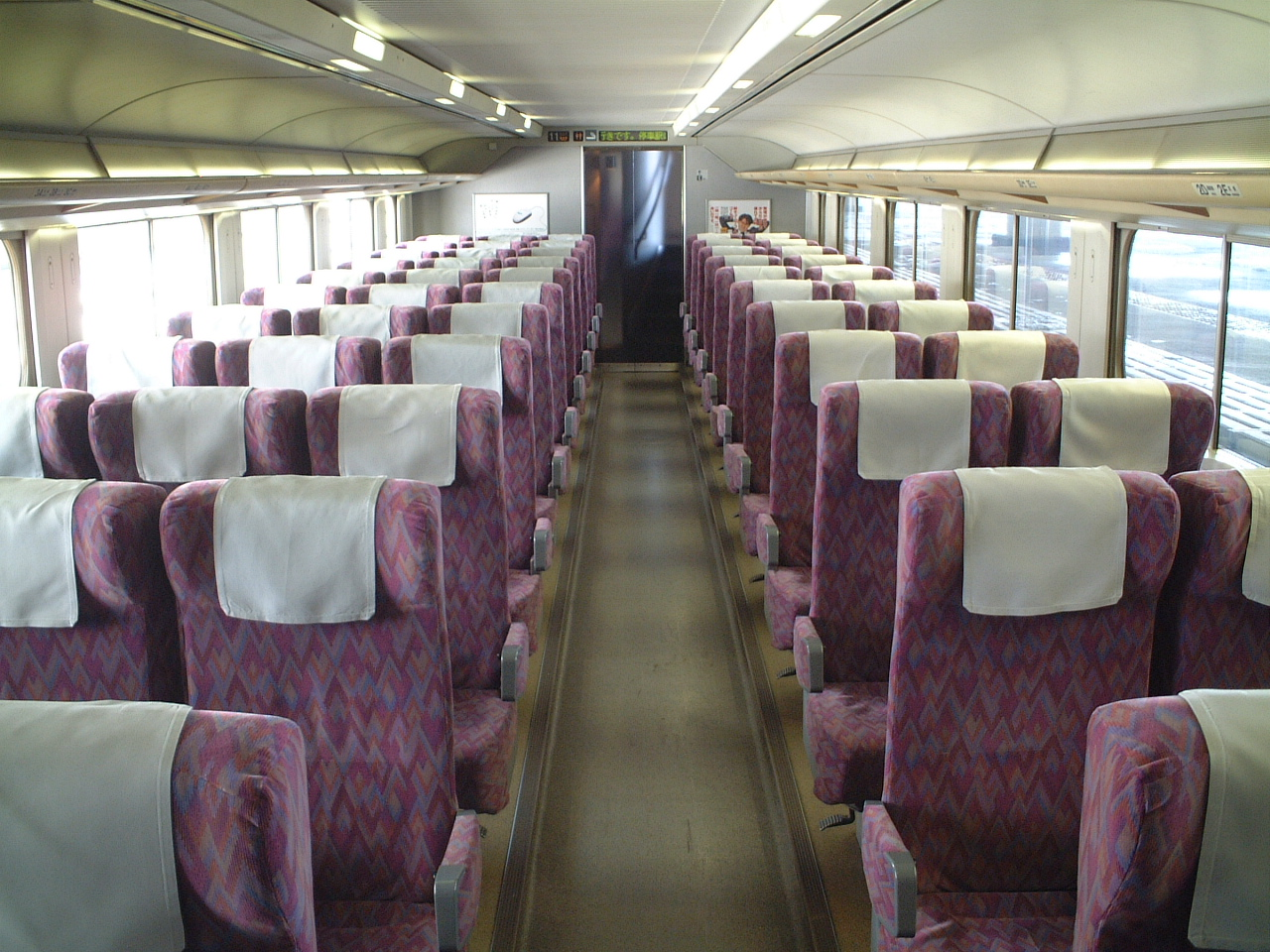
Standard class reserved car lower deck in January 2002

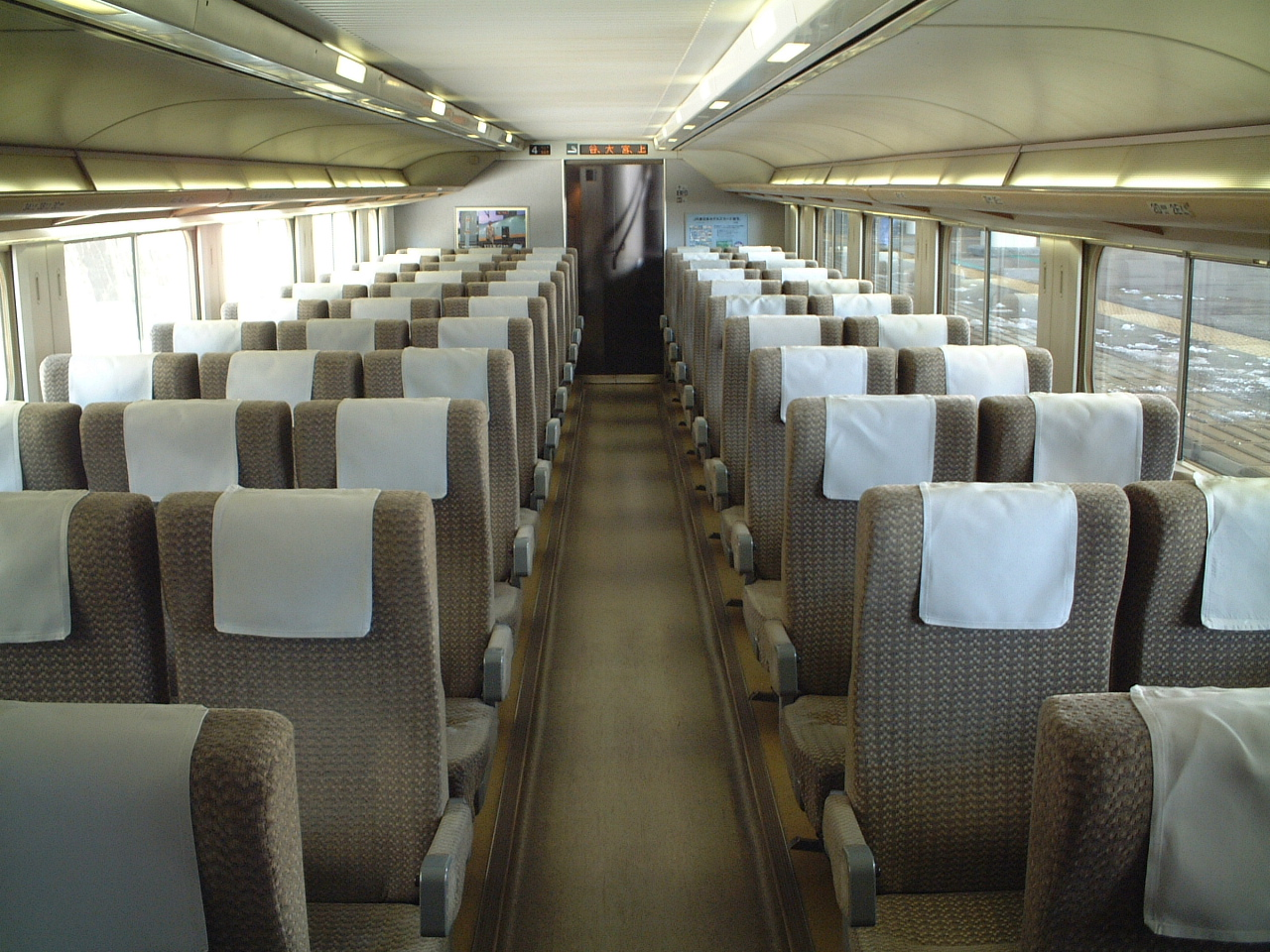
Standard class non-reserved car lower deck in January 2002

=== Post-refurbishment ===
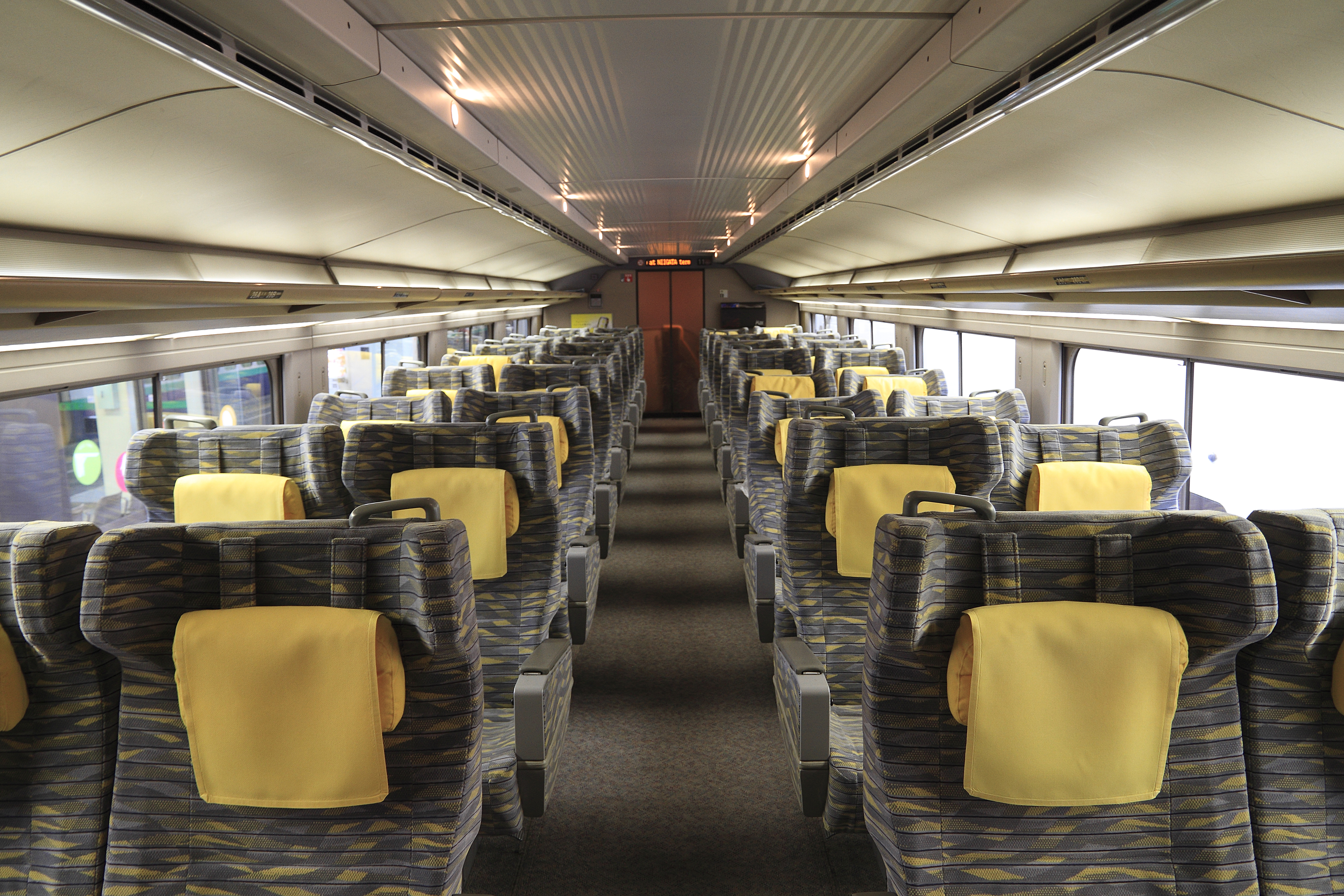
Car 11 Green car upper deck in October 2011

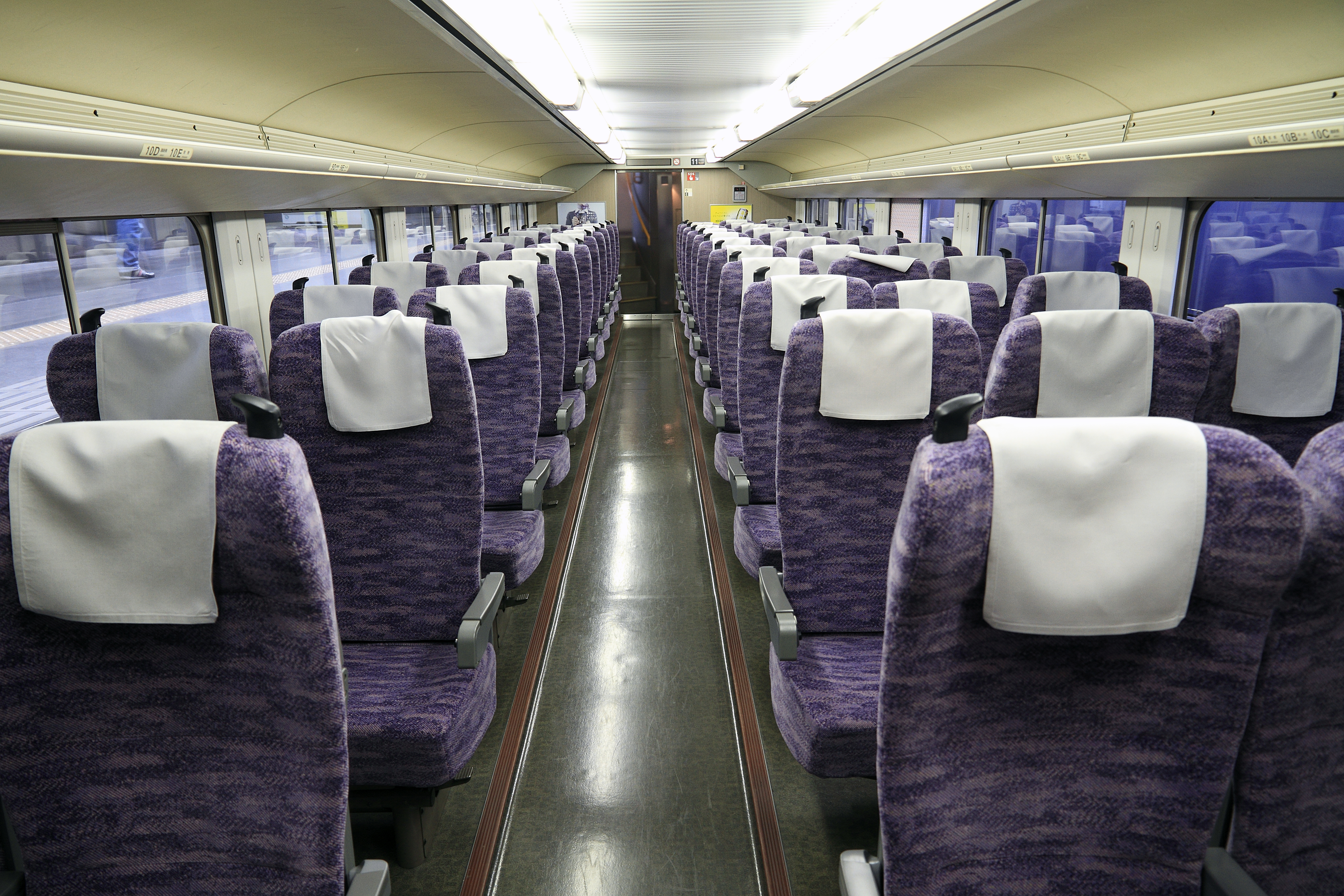
Car 11 standard class reserved car lower deck in October 2011

== Formation ==
The fleet of 12-car sets, numbered M1 to M6, were formed as follows, with car 1 at the Tokyo end.

Car No.	1	2	3	4	5	6	7	8	9	10	11	12
Designation	T1c	M1	M2	T1	T2	M1	M2	Tpk	Tps	M1s	M2s	T2c
Numbering	E153-100	E155-100	E156-100	E158-100	E159	E155	E156	E158-200	E148	E145	E146	E154
Upper-level accommodation	Non-reserved (3+3)				Reserved (2+3)				Green (2+2)			Reserved (2+3)
Lower-level accommodation	Reserved (2+3)											
Total seating capacity	86	121		135	124	110		91	75	91		80
Weight (t)	56.2	59.2	61.2	53.7	53.6	59.2	61.7	55.2	54.6	59.2	62.0	56.5

Cars 6 and 10 were each equipped with a PS201 scissors-type pantograph.

== Fleet details ==
Set	Manufacturer	Delivered	Repainted	Refurbished	DS-ATC added	Withdrawn
M1	Kawasaki Heavy Industries	3 March 1994	17 September 2004	10 July 2004	15 September 2005	2 April 2012
M2	Hitachi	23 March 1994	27 November 2004	4 June 2005	5 August 2005	14 April 2012
M3	Hitachi / Kawasaki Heavy Industries	6 February 1995	26 December 2003	31 March 2004	2 November 2005	29 August 2012
M4	Hitachi	17 October 1995	25 November 2003	2 October 2003	2 February 2006	7 December 2012
M5	Kawasaki Heavy Industries	3 November 1995	11 March 2006	6 June 2006	11 March 2006	4 October 2012
M6	Hitachi / Kawasaki Heavy Industries	22 November 1995	27 November 2005	23 December 2005	27 November 2005	7 November 2012

== History ==
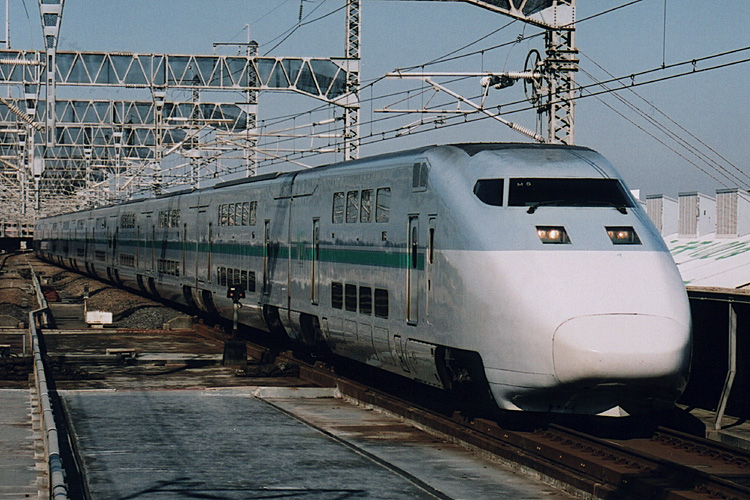
E1 series set M6 in original livery in November 2004

The first E1 series set, M1, was delivered to Sendai Depot on 3 March 1994, carrying "DDS E1" logos (DDS standing for double-deck Shinkansen). The first two sets entered revenue service on the Tōhoku Shinkansen on 15 July 1994, by which time the original "DDS" logos had been replaced with "Max" logos. The original livery comprised "sky grey" on the upper body and "silver grey" on the lower body, separated by a "peacock green" stripe.

From 4 December 1999, all six trainsets were transferred from Sendai Depot to Niigata Depot, with operations thereafter limited to Jōetsu Shinkansen services, including Max Asahi and Max Tanigawa. The fleet was also used at various times on Max Yamabiko, Max Asahi, Max Toki, and Max Aoba services.

=== Refurbishment ===
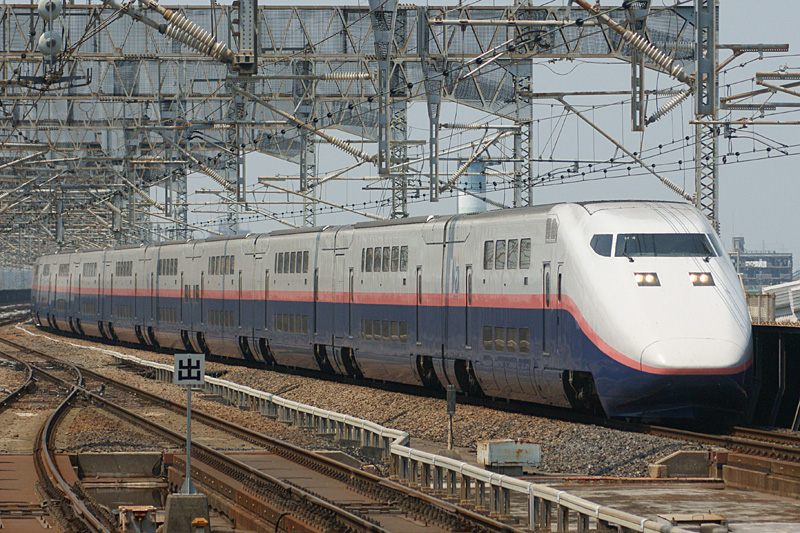
Refurbished set M4 in May 2008

From late 2003, the fleet underwent refurbishment, including the installation of new seating and repainting into a new livery of "stratus white" on the upper body and "aster blue" on the lower body, separated by an "ibis pink" stripe.

All cars became no-smoking from the start of the revised timetable on 18 March 2007.

=== Withdrawal ===
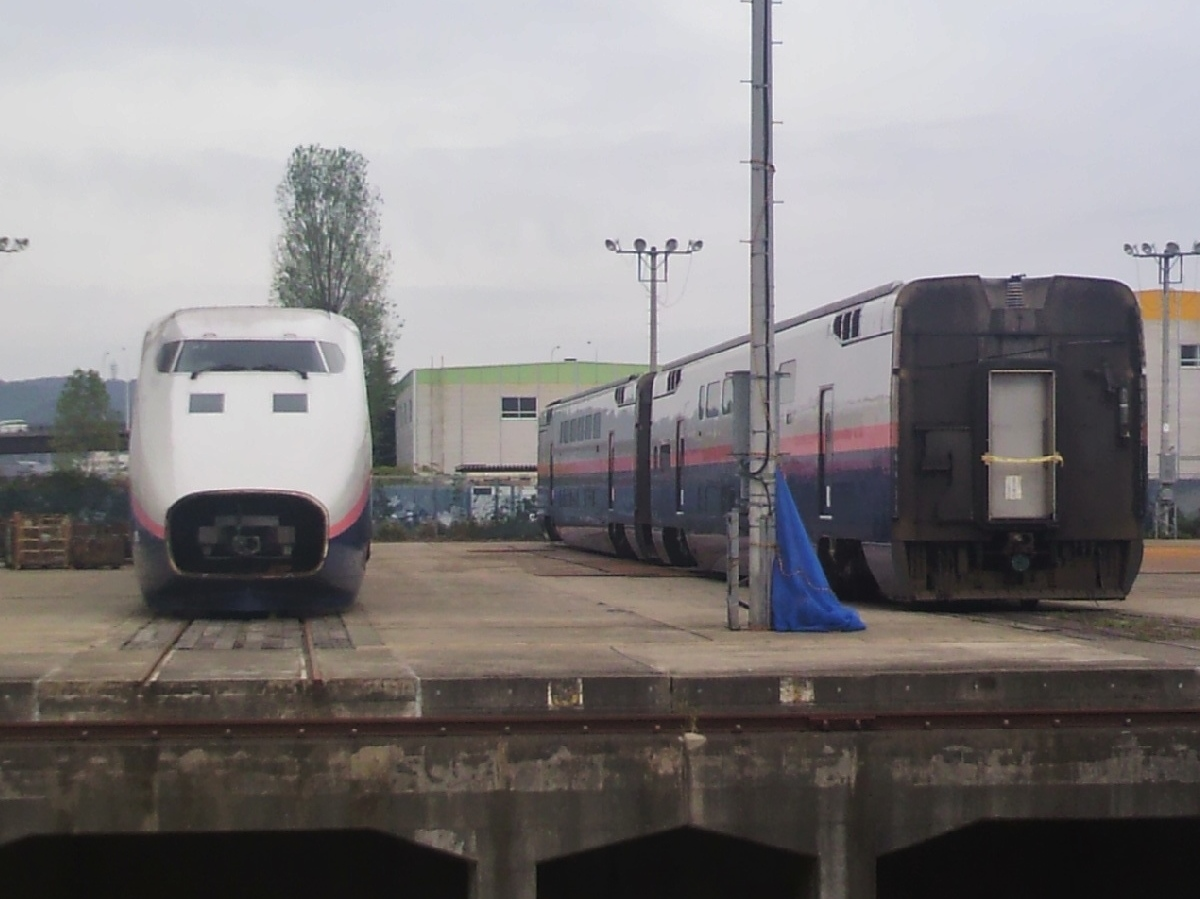
Withdrawn E1 series shinkansen cars awaiting scrapping at Sendai General Shinkansen Depot in October 2012

The first two sets were withdrawn in April 2012: M1 on 2 April and M2 on 14 April. The remaining sets were withdrawn from service with the start of the revised timetable on 29 September 2012.

A special "Thank you Max Asahi" service operated from Niigata to Tokyo on 27 October 2012, followed by a final run from Tokyo to Niigata on 28 October 2012 using set M4.

== Bodyside logos ==
Between 1 December 2001 and 31 March 2002, the E1 series fleet carried "Alpen Super Express" logos as part of JR East's "JR + Snow" promotional campaign.

From mid-August 2012 until final withdrawal on 28 September, the remaining three sets had a second toki crested ibis added to their bodyside logos to mark the hatching of ibis chicks in the wild.

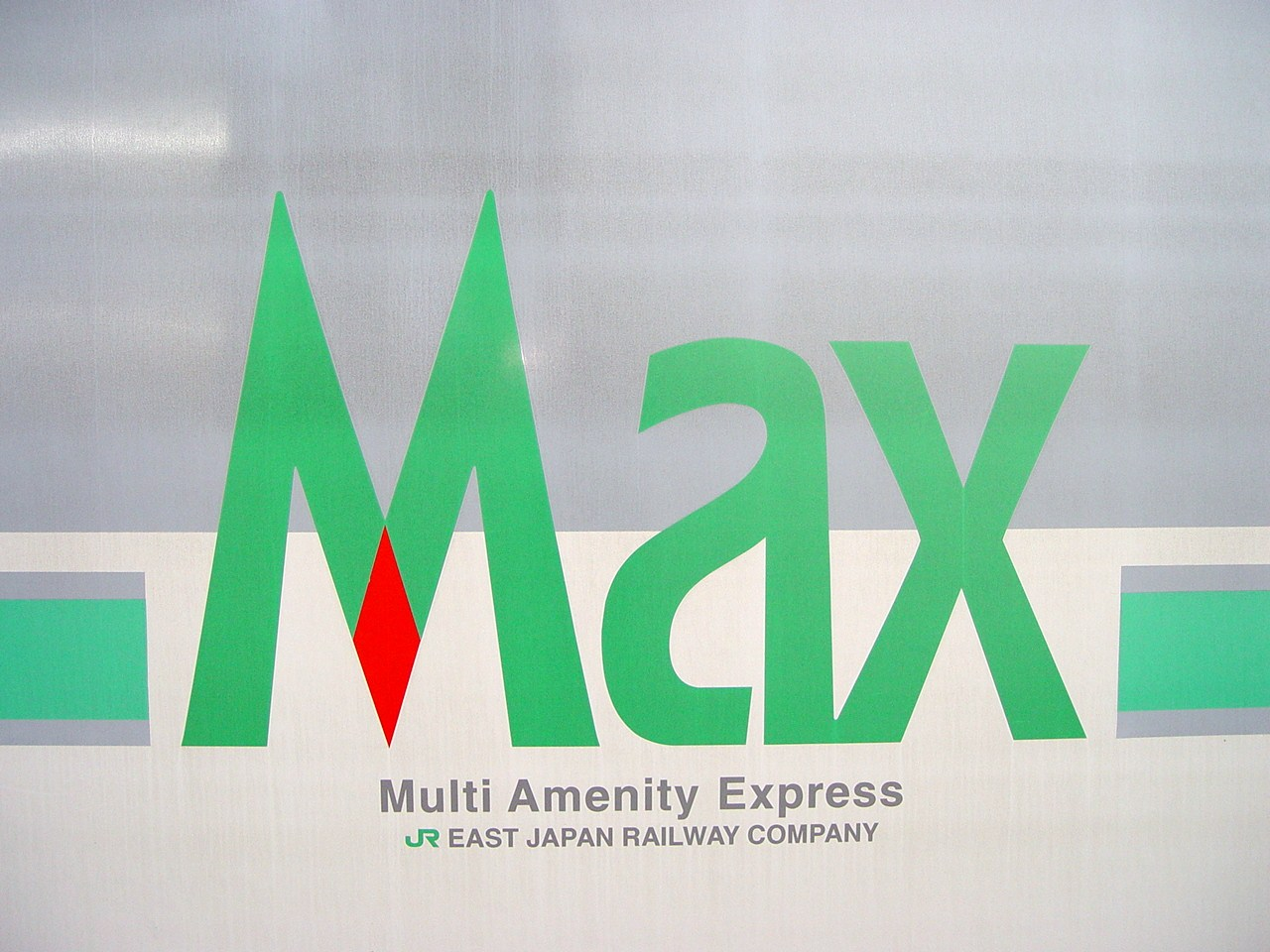
Original "Max" logo in December 2003 prior to refurbishment

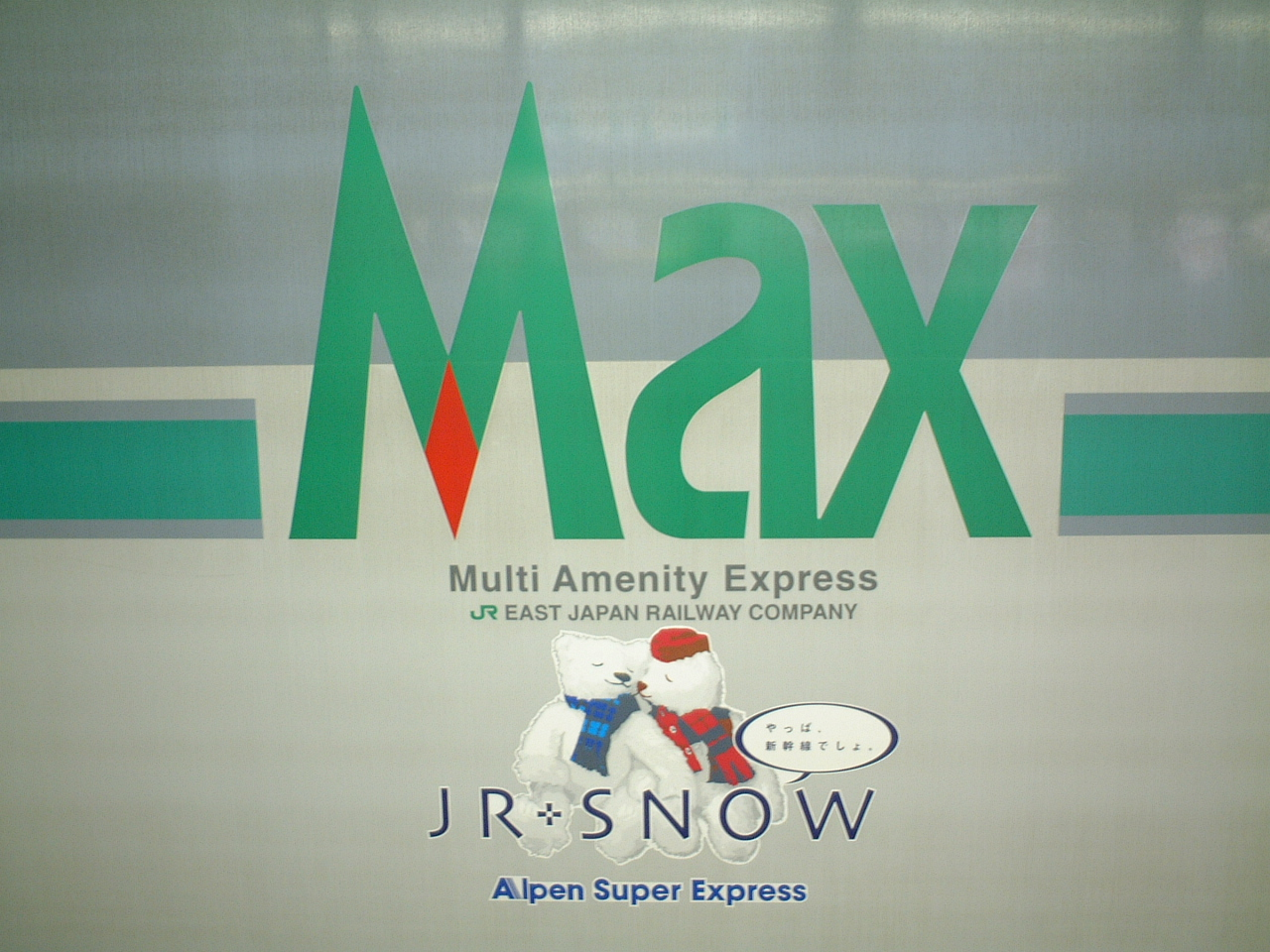
"Alpen Snow Express" promotional logo in March 2002

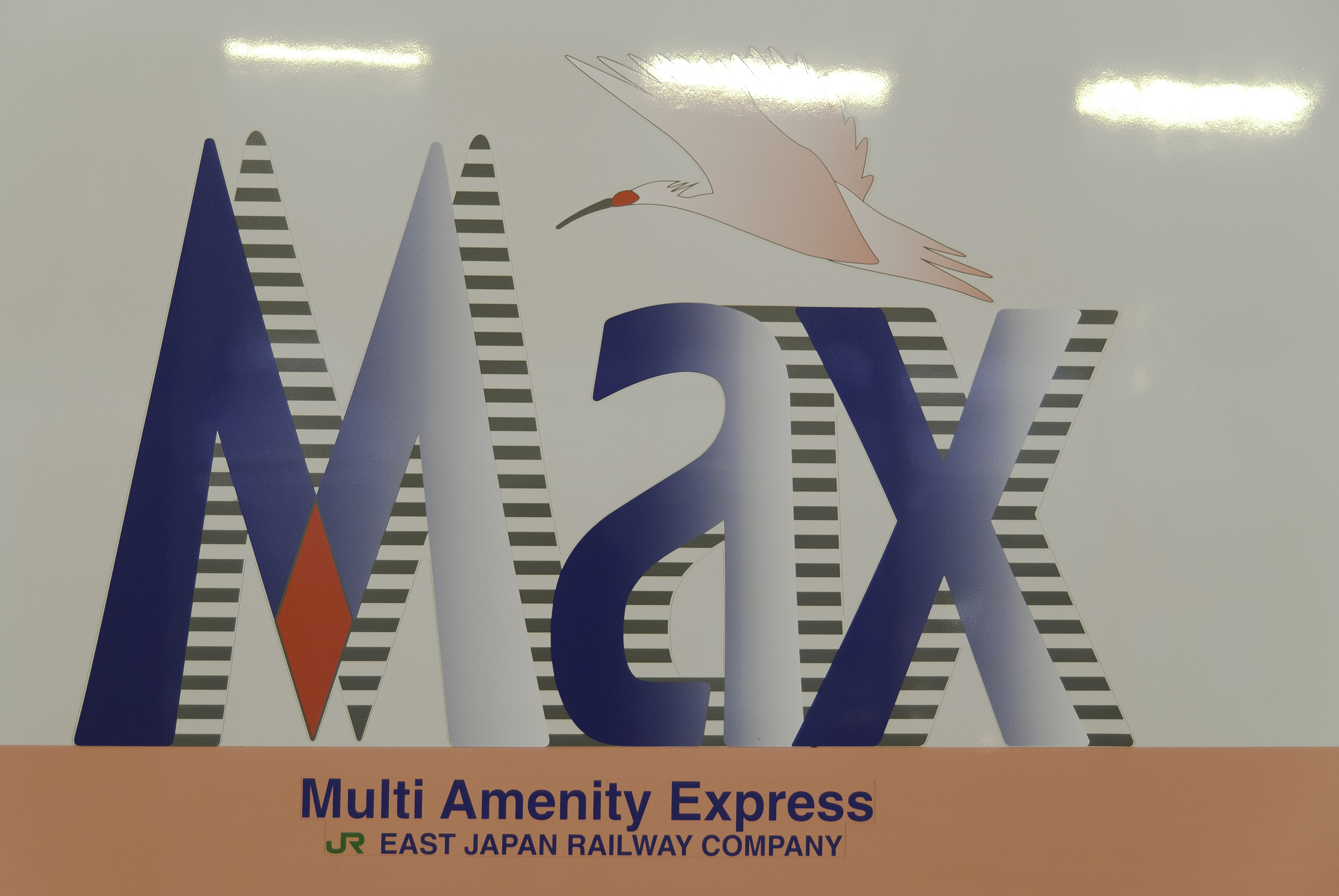
"Max" logo on a refurbished set in April 2010

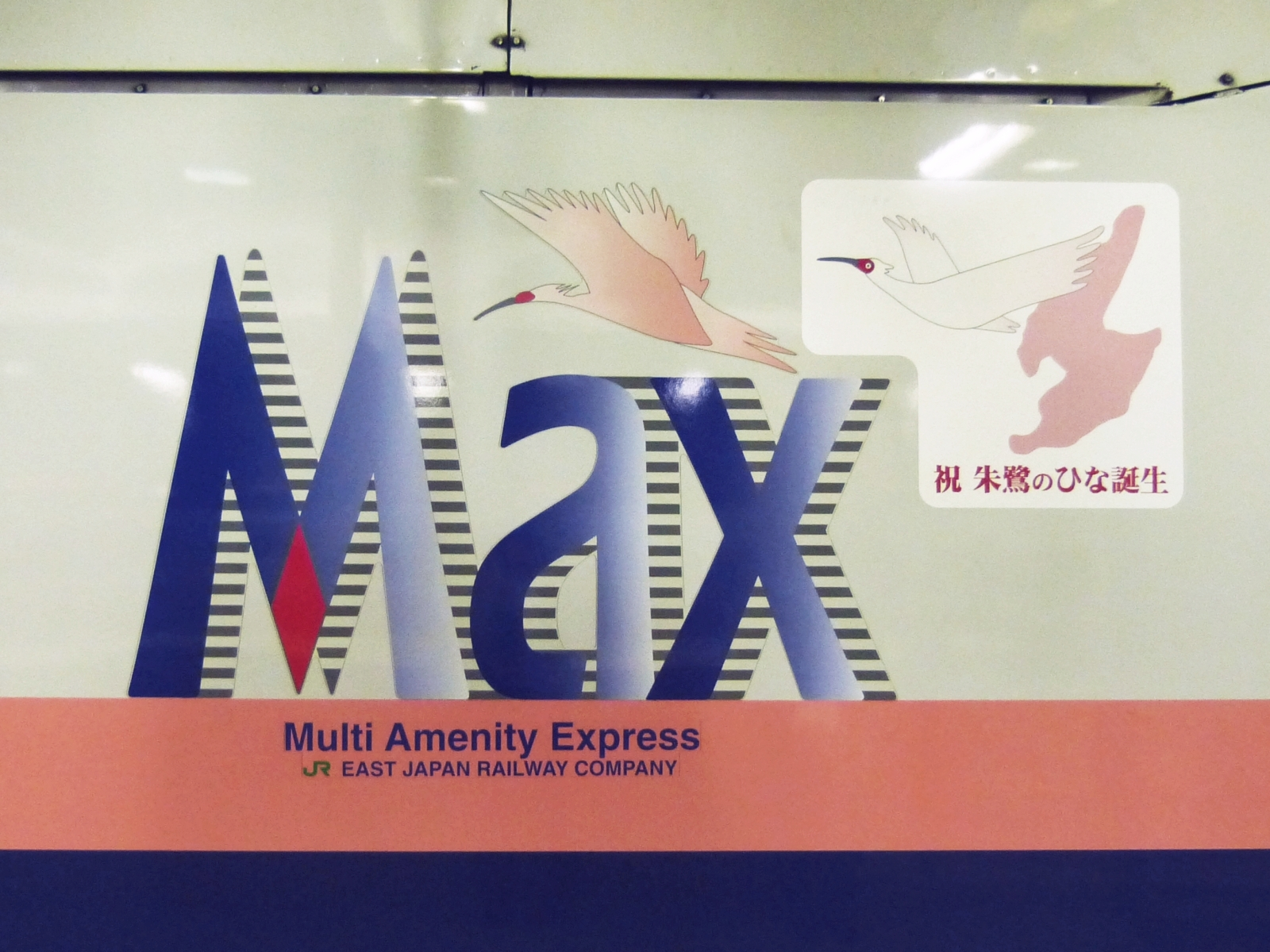
Modified "Max" logo in August 2012

== Preserved examples ==
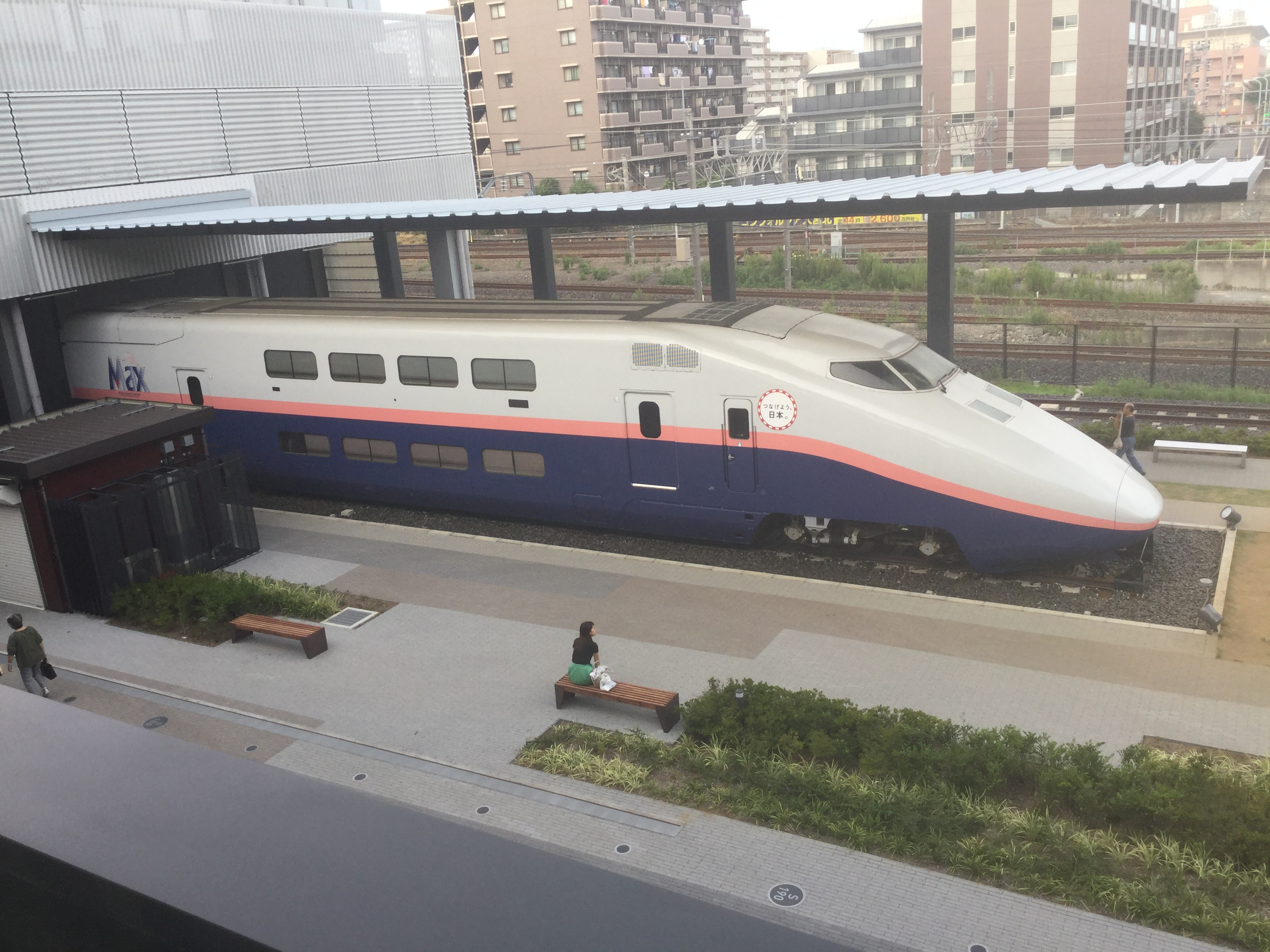
E1 Series Shinkansen static display at Railway Museum in Saitama.

One E1 series car is preserved: car E153-104 of set M4. This was moved to the Railway Museum in Saitama in December 2017, and is on display since spring 2018.

== See also ==
- TGV Duplex, French double-deck high speed train
- List of high speed trains
