= Kikko Terrace =

Rocky terrace near Cape Hinode, Antarctica

Kikko Terrace (68°8′S 42°40′E) is a rocky terrace rising to 150 metres (500 ft) about 1.5 nautical miles (3 km) south-southeast of Cape Hinode, Antarctica. The feature was mapped by the Japanese Antarctic Research Expedition from surveys and air photos obtained 1957–1962. The Japanese form of the name, "Kikko-ga-hara" (tortoise shells terrace), and the English form, Kikko Terrace, were given by the Antarctic Place-Names Committee of Japan in 1973.
