= Asahi (train) =

Japanese limited-stop train service (ceased 2002)

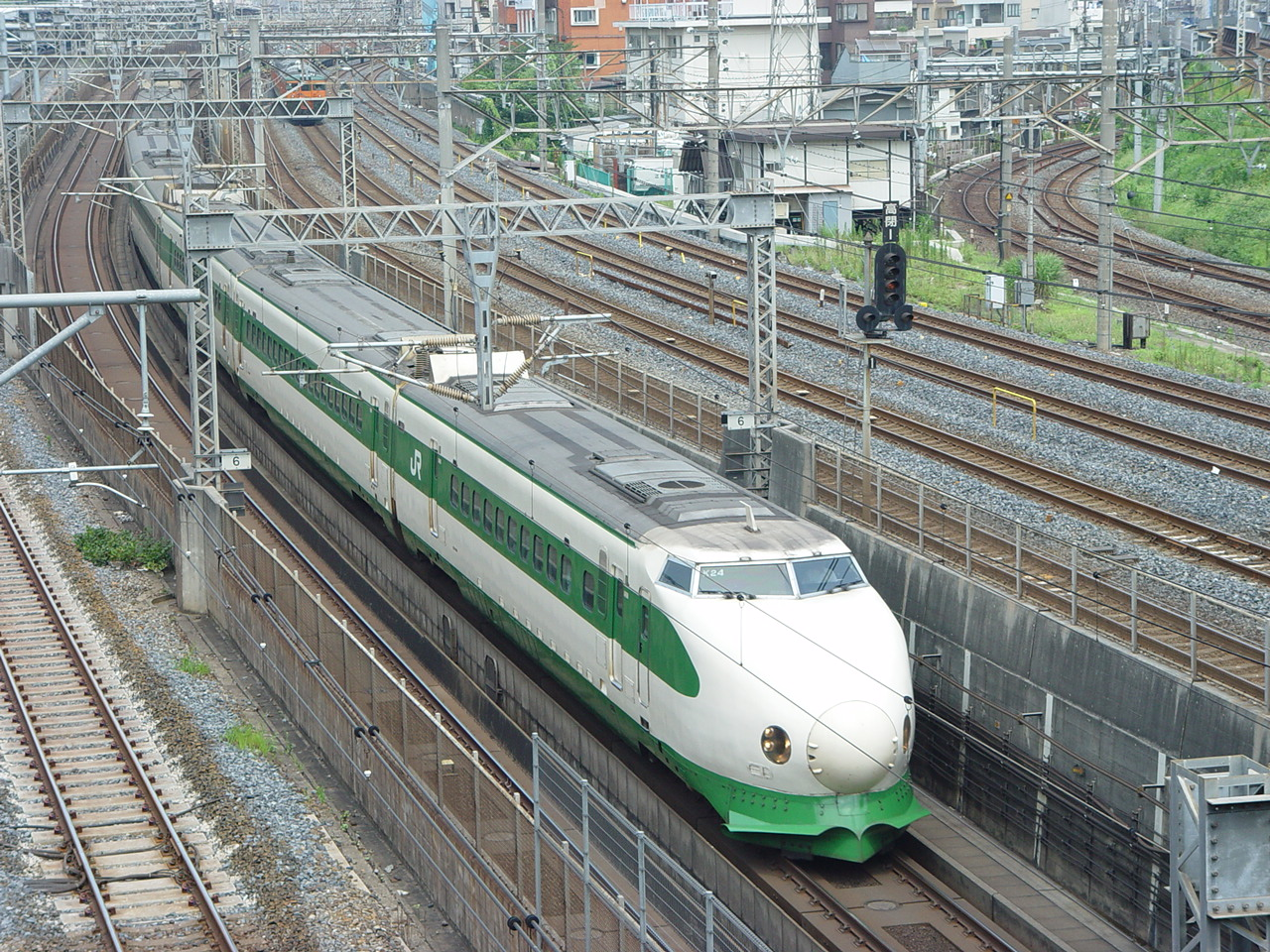
- 200 series set K24 on an Asahi service in Tokyo in August 2002

Overview
- Service type: Shinkansen
- Status: Discontinued
- First service: 1960 (Semi-express); 1982 (Shinkansen)
- Last service: 30 November 2002
- Successor: Toki
- Current operator: JR East
- Former operator: JNR; JR East

Route
- Termini: Tokyo; Niigata
- Stops: Limited stop
- Line used: Joetsu Shinkansen

On-board services
- Class: Standard + Green
- Catering facilities: Trolley service

Technical
- Rolling stock: 200 series, E1 series, E4 series
- Track gauge: 1,435 mm (4 ft 8 1/2 in)
- Electrification: 25 kV AC overhead
- Operating speed: 275 km/h (171 mph)

The Asahi (あさひ) was a limited-stop train service that operated until November 2002 in Japan on the Joetsu Shinkansen high-speed line between Tokyo and Niigata.

== Operations ==
The Asahi shinkansen services ran approximately hourly, with two down services (Asahi 1 and 3) permitted to operate at 275 km/h in the tunnel section between Jōmō-Kōgen and Urasa using specially modified 200 series (F90) sets, completing the journey in 1 hour 40 minutes (compared to the fastest journey time of 1 hour 37 minutes in 2008 for Toki services operating at a maximum speed of 240 km/h).

== Former rolling stock ==
- 200 series 8/10/12-car sets (November 1982 – November 2002)
- E1 series 12-car sets, as Max Asahi (July 1994 – November 2002)
- E2 series 8-car sets (December 1998 – November 2002)
- E4 series 8-car sets, as Max Asahi (May 2001 – November 2002)
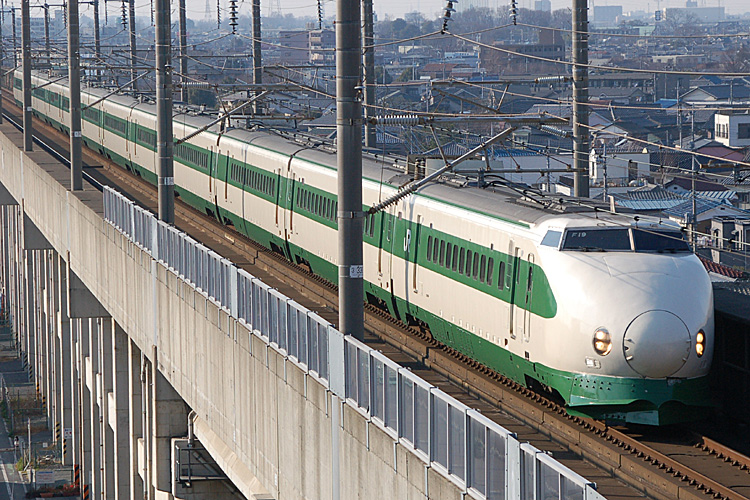
A 200 series Shinkansen, similar to those used on Asahi services

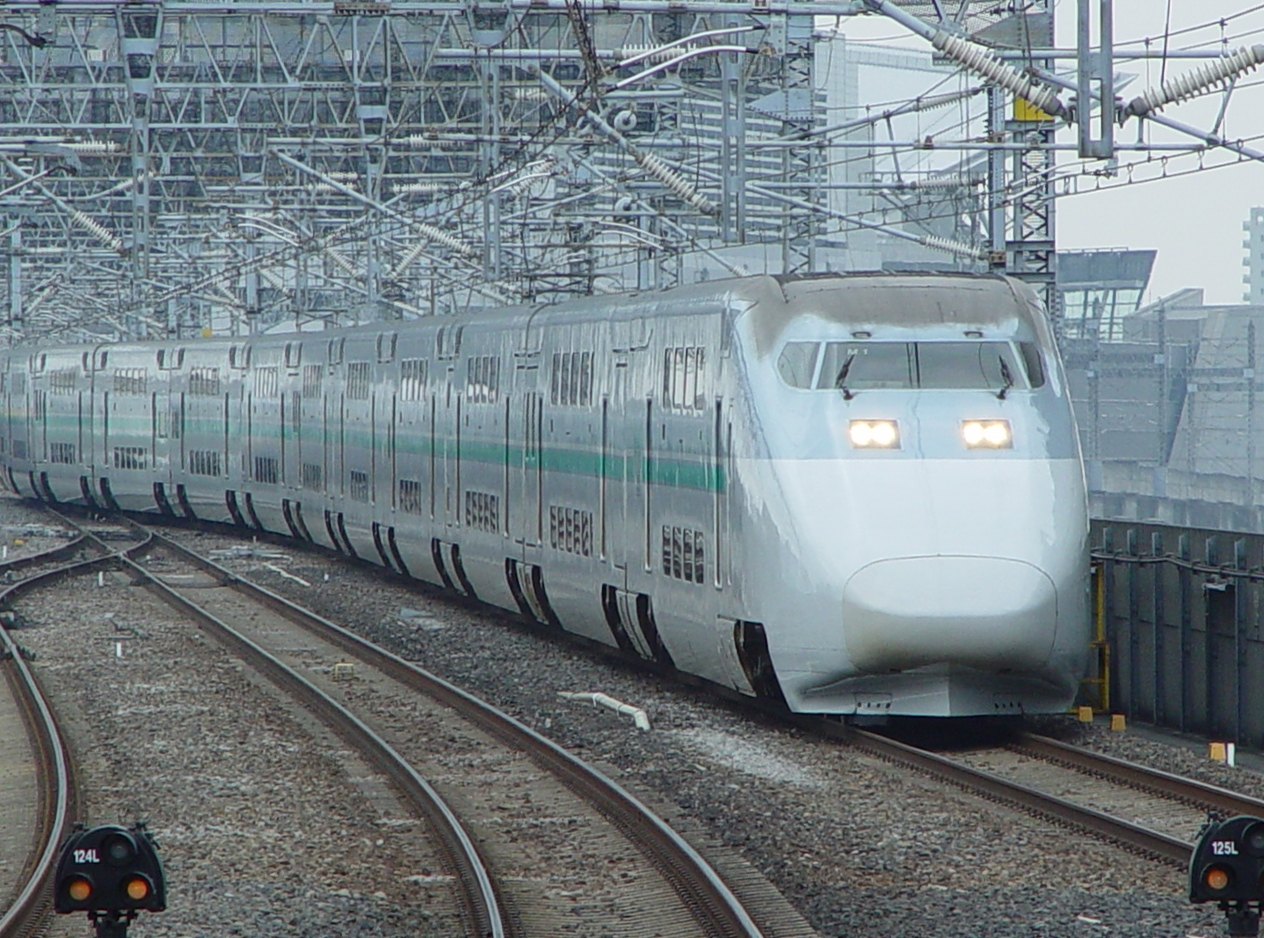
An E1 series Shinkansen on an Max Asahi 317 service at Ōmiya Station (Saitama)

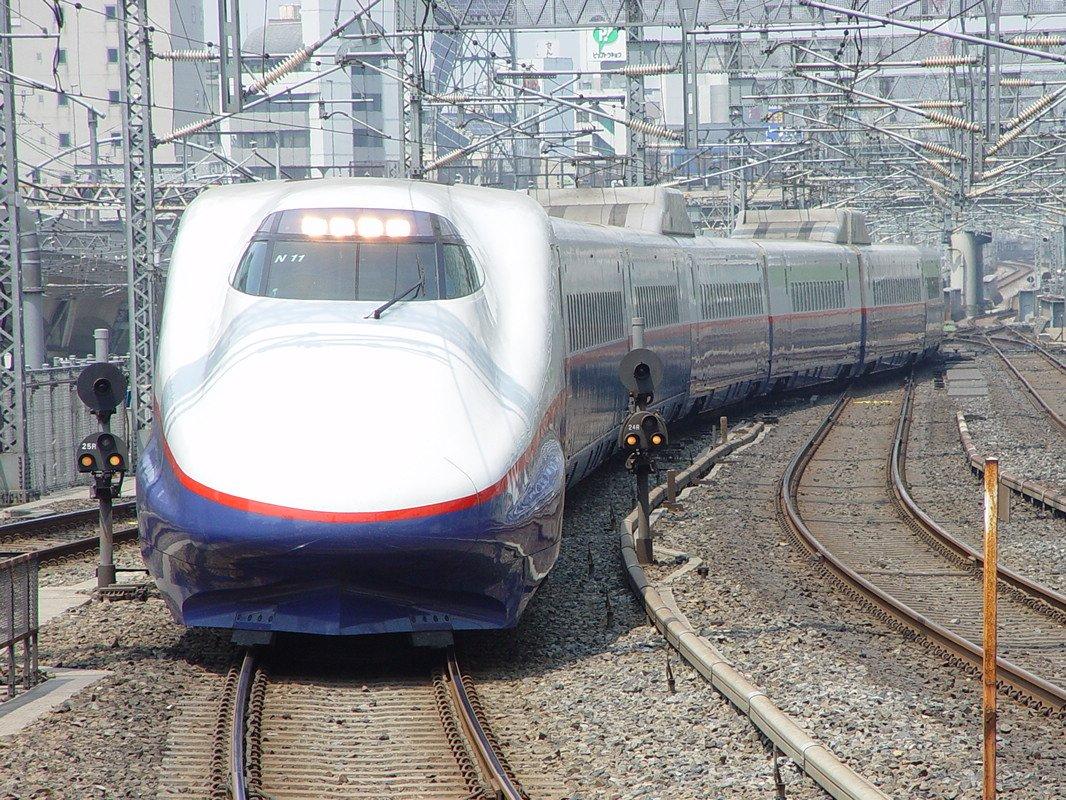
Set N11 of the E2 series Shinkansen at Tokyo on an Asama 514 service, similar to those used on Asahi services

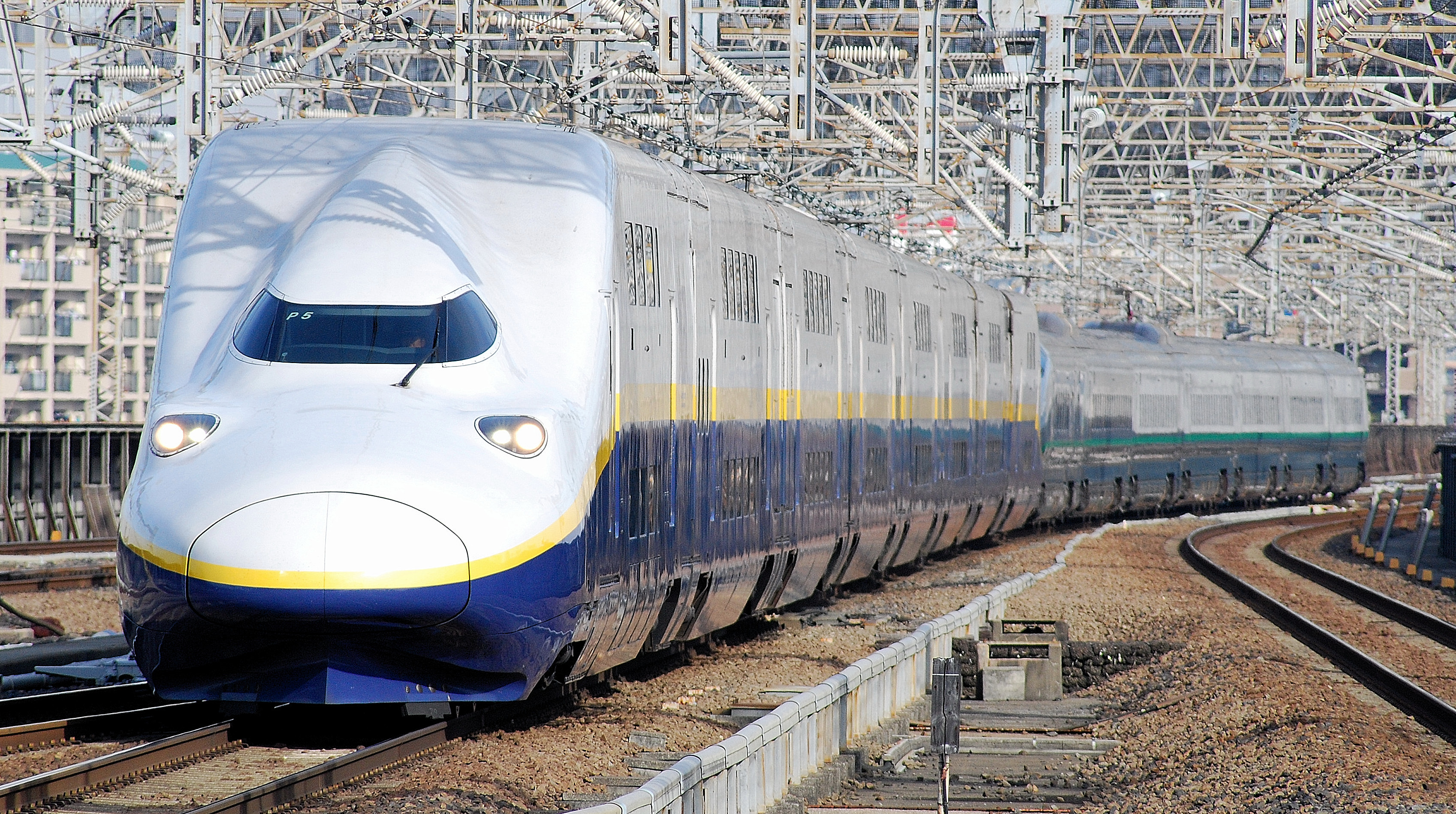
An E4 Shinkansen, similar to those used on Max Asahi services

== History ==
The name Asahi, meaning "morning sun" in Japanese, dates from before World War II, when it was used for an express train operated by Japan from Rason in Korea (present-day North Korea) to Xinjing in Manchuria (present-day China).

It was first used in Japan on 1 November 1960 for semi-express (準急, junkyū) services operating between Niigata and Sendai. This service was renamed Benibana from 1 July 1982.

From the start of services on the newly opened Joetsu Shinkansen on 15 November 1982, Asahi was the name used for the limited-stop shinkansen services operating initially between Ōmiya and Niigata, later between Ueno and Niigata, and eventually between Tokyo and Niigata. At the start of Joetsu Shinkansen operations in 1982, 11 Asahi services operated in each direction daily. With the start of shinkansen operations from Ueno on 14 March 1985, the number of Asahi services was increased to 34 in each direction daily. From 10 March 1990, two down services (nicknamed Super Asahi) were timed to operate at a maximum speed of 275 km/h in the tunnel section between Jōmō-Kōgen and Urasa. New E1 series "Max" 12-car sets were introduced on Max Asahi services from 15 July 1994, with two workings in each direction daily between Tokyo and Niigata. The number of Max Asahi services was increased to five in each direction daily from 3 December 1994. E4 series "Max" trains built in 1997 were first assigned to Max Asahi services on 7 May 2001.

The Asahi name was discontinued from 1 December 2002 when the Toki name was re-introduced for all Tokyo to Niigata trains.

== See also ==
- List of named passenger trains of Japan
