= Jōetsu Shinkansen =

High-speed railway line in Japan

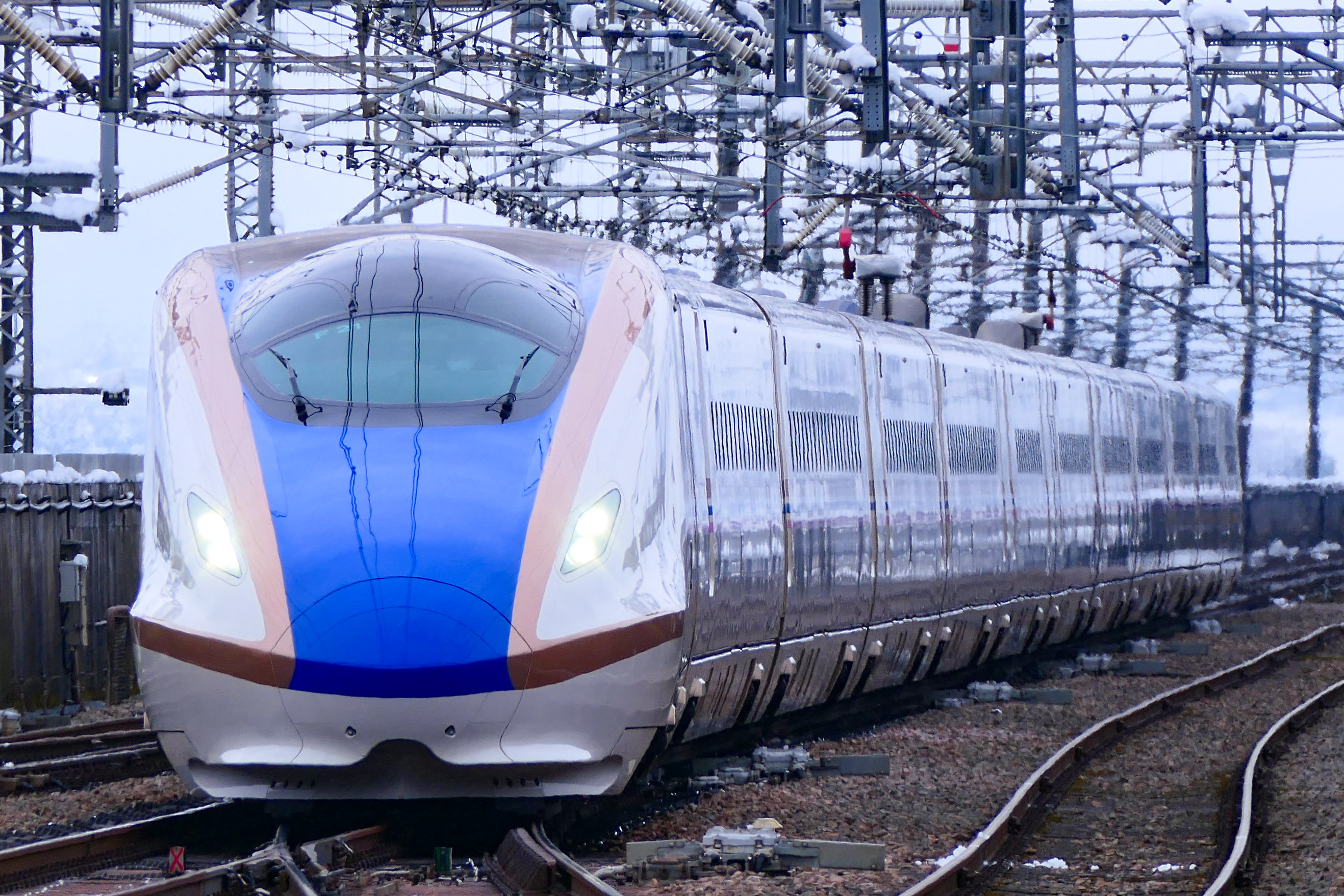
- An E7 series train on a Joetsu Shinkansen service

Overview
- Native name: 上越新幹線
- Owner: JR East
- Locale: Tokyo; Saitama, Gunma, and Niigata prefectures
- Termini: Niigata; Omiya (through service to Tokyo)
- Stations: 10

Service
- Type: High-speed rail (Shinkansen)
- System: Shinkansen
- Services: Toki; Tanigawa
- Operator: JR East
- Depot: Niigata
- Rolling stock: E7

History
- Opened: 15 November 1982 (43 years ago)

Technical
- Line length: 269.5 km (167.5 mi)
- Num of tracks: 2
- Track gauge: 1,435 mm (4 ft 8 1/2 in) standard gauge
- Electrification: Overhead line, 25 kV 50 Hz AC
- Operating speed: 275 km/h (171 mph) (Note: Tokyo–Ueno: 110 km/h (68 mph); Ueno–Omiya: 130 km/h (81 mph))
- Signalling: Cab signalling
- Train protection system: DS-ATC
Route map

The Jōetsu Shinkansen (Japanese: 上越新幹線) is a Japanese high-speed rail line and part of the nationwide Shinkansen network. Operated by the East Japan Railway Company (JR East), it links Niigata in the north to Ōmiya in the south, with through service to Tokyo via the Tōhoku Shinkansen.

Despite its name, the line does not pass through the city of Jōetsu or Niigata's Jōetsu region, which instead are served by the Hokuriku Shinkansen, which branches off the Jōetsu Shinkansen at Takasaki. The line's name originates from the parallel Jōetsu Line, which in turn is named after the combined reading from the first kanji of the old provinces that it connects: Kōzuke Province (modern day Gunma Prefecture), and Echigo Province (modern day Niigata Prefecture).

Two services currently operate on the route: the limited-stop Toki, which runs the length of the corridor, and the all-stops Tanigawa, which runs between Tokyo and Echigo-Yuzawa Station. During the winter, Tanigawa trains continue via the Gala-Yuzawa Line, a 1.8-kilometre (1.1 mi) branch line to serve Gala-Yuzawa Station and its adjoining ski resort, which is also owned by JR East. The branch line was originally built as sidings for trains terminating at and departing from Echigo-Yuzawa.

As of 2023, the maximum line speed is 275 kilometres per hour (171 mph). The fastest services cover the 269.5 kilometres (167.5 mi) between Tokyo and Niigata in 90 minutes.

== Train services ==
The Jōetsu Shinkansen operates with two different services:

- Toki: Tokyo – Niigata limited-stop service
- Tanigawa: Tokyo – Echigo-Yuzawa all-stops service. During winter, trains continue to Gala-Yuzawa via the Gala-Yuzawa Line.

One service has been discontinued:

- Asahi, Tokyo – Niigata limited-stop service. (discontinued 30 November 2002)

== Stations ==
Legend:

| ● | All trains stop |
| ▲ | Some trains stop |

| Station | Distance in km (mi) from | | Toki | Tanigawa | Transfers | Location | |
| Station | Ōmiya | Tokyo | Toki | Tanigawa | Transfers | Location | |
|---|---|---|---|---|---|---|---|
| Tokyo 東京 | 31.3 (19.4) | 0 (0) | ● | ● | Tokaido Shinkansen; Tōkaidō Line (JT01); Ueno-Tokyo Line (JU01); Keihin–Tōhoku Line (JK26); Yamanote Line (JY01); Chūō Line (JC01); Yokosuka Line/Sobu Line (JO19); Keiyō Line (JE01); Marunouchi Line (M-17) | Chiyoda | Tokyo |
| Ueno 上野 | 27.7 (17.2) | 3.6 (2.2) | ▲ | ● | Utsunomiya Line/Takasaki Line (JU02); Ueno-Tokyo Line (JU02); Keihin–Tōhoku Line (JK30); Yamanote Line (JY05); Jōban Line (Rapid) (JJ01); Ginza Line (G-16); Hibiya Line (H-18); Main Line (Keisei Ueno: KS01) | Taitō | Tokyo |
| Ōmiya 大宮 | 0 (0) | 31.3 (19.4) | ● | ● | Tōhoku Shinkansen; Keihin–Tōhoku Line (JK47); Saikyō Line (JA26); Utsunomiya Line/Takasaki Line (JU07); Shōnan–Shinjuku Line (JS24); Kawagoe Line; Tōbu Urban Park Line (TD01); New Shuttle (NS01) | Ōmiya-ku, Saitama | Saitama |
| Kumagaya 熊谷 | 36.6 (22.7) | 67.9 (42.2) | ▲ | ● | ■ Takasaki Line; Chichibu Main Line (CR09) | Kumagaya | Saitama |
| Honjō-Waseda 本庄早稲田 | 57.7 (35.9) | 89.0 (55.3) | ▲ | ▲ | | Honjō | Saitama |
| Takasaki 高崎 | 77.3 (48.0) | 108.6 (67.5) | ▲ | ● | Hokuriku Shinkansen; ■ Agatsuma Line (Note: Although the official terminus of the Ryōmō Line is at Shin-Maebashi and that of the Agatsuma Line is at Shibukawa, trains on both lines run through to Takasaki.); ■ Hachikō Line; ■ Jōetsu Line; ■ Ryōmō Line; ■ Shin'etsu Main Line; ■ Takasaki Line; Jōshin Line | Takasaki | Gunma |
| Jōmō-Kōgen 上毛高原 | 119.1 (74.0) | 150.4 (93.5) | ▲ | ● | | Minakami | Gunma |
| Echigo-Yuzawa 越後湯沢 | 151.4 (94.1) | 182.7 (113.5) | ▲ | ● | Gala-Yuzawa Line; ■ Jōetsu Line; Hokuhoku Line | Yuzawa | Niigata |
| Urasa 浦佐 | 181.0 (112.5) | 212.3 (131.9) | ▲ | | ■ Jōetsu Line | Minamiuonuma | Niigata |
| Nagaoka 長岡 | 213.8 (132.8) | 245.1 (152.3) | ▲ | | ■ Shin'etsu Main Line; ■ Jōetsu Line (Note: Although the official terminus of the Joetsu Line is at Miyauchi, trains on the line run through to Nagaoka.) | Nagaoka | Niigata |
| Tsubame-Sanjō 燕三条 | 237.4 (147.5) | 268.7 (167.0) | ▲ | | ■ Yahiko Line | Sanjō | Niigata |
| Niigata 新潟 | 269.5 (167.5) | 300.8 (186.9) | ● | | ■ Shin'etsu Main Line; ■ Hakushin Line; ■ Echigo Line; ■ Ban'etsu West Line (Note: Although the official terminus of the Ban'etsu West Line is at Niitsu, most trains on the line run through to Niigata.) | Chūō-ku, Niigata | Niigata |

== Rolling stock ==
As of 18 March 2023 the following train types operate on Jōetsu Shinkansen services.

- E7 series: Toki / Tanigawa (since 3 March 2019)

Between fiscal 2018 and 2020, eleven 12-car E7 series train sets were introduced on Jōetsu Shinkansen services, replacing the E4 series trains, raising the speed from 240 km/h (150 mph) to 275 km/h (171 mph). Additional sets were gradually introduced through 2023 for the replacement of E2 series trains.

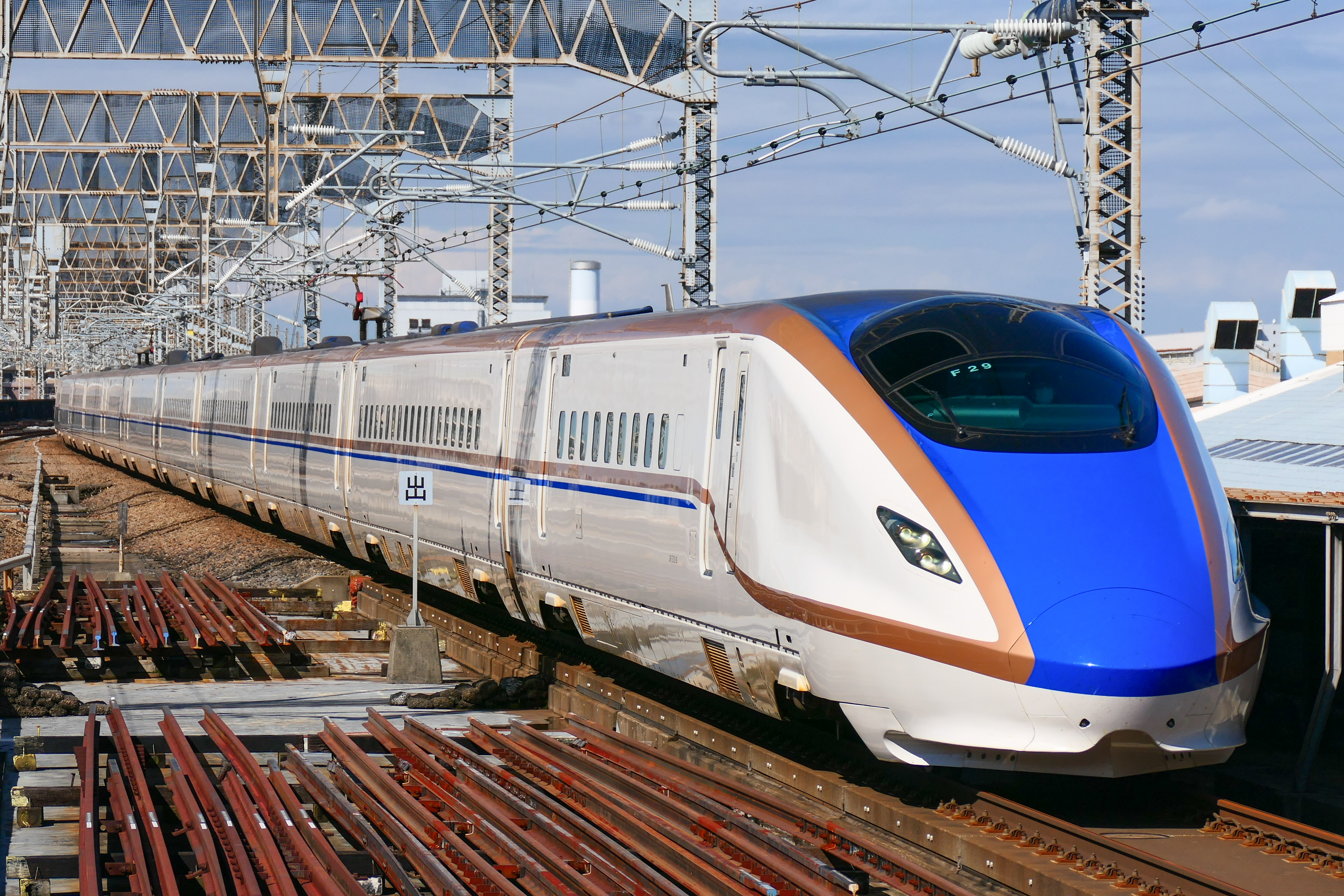
E7 series trainset in October 2022

=== Non-revenue type ===
- East i (E926)

=== Former rolling stock ===
- 200 series: Asahi / Toki / Tanigawa (15 November 1982 – 14 April 2013)
- E1 series: Max Asahi / Max Toki / Max Tanigawa (15 July 1994 – 28 September 2012)
- E2 series: Toki / Tanigawa (January 2013 – March 2023)
- E3 series Genbi Shinkansen excursion set (29 April 2016 – 19 December 2020)
- E4 series: Max Asahi / Max Toki / Max Tanigawa (7 May 2001 – 1 October 2021)
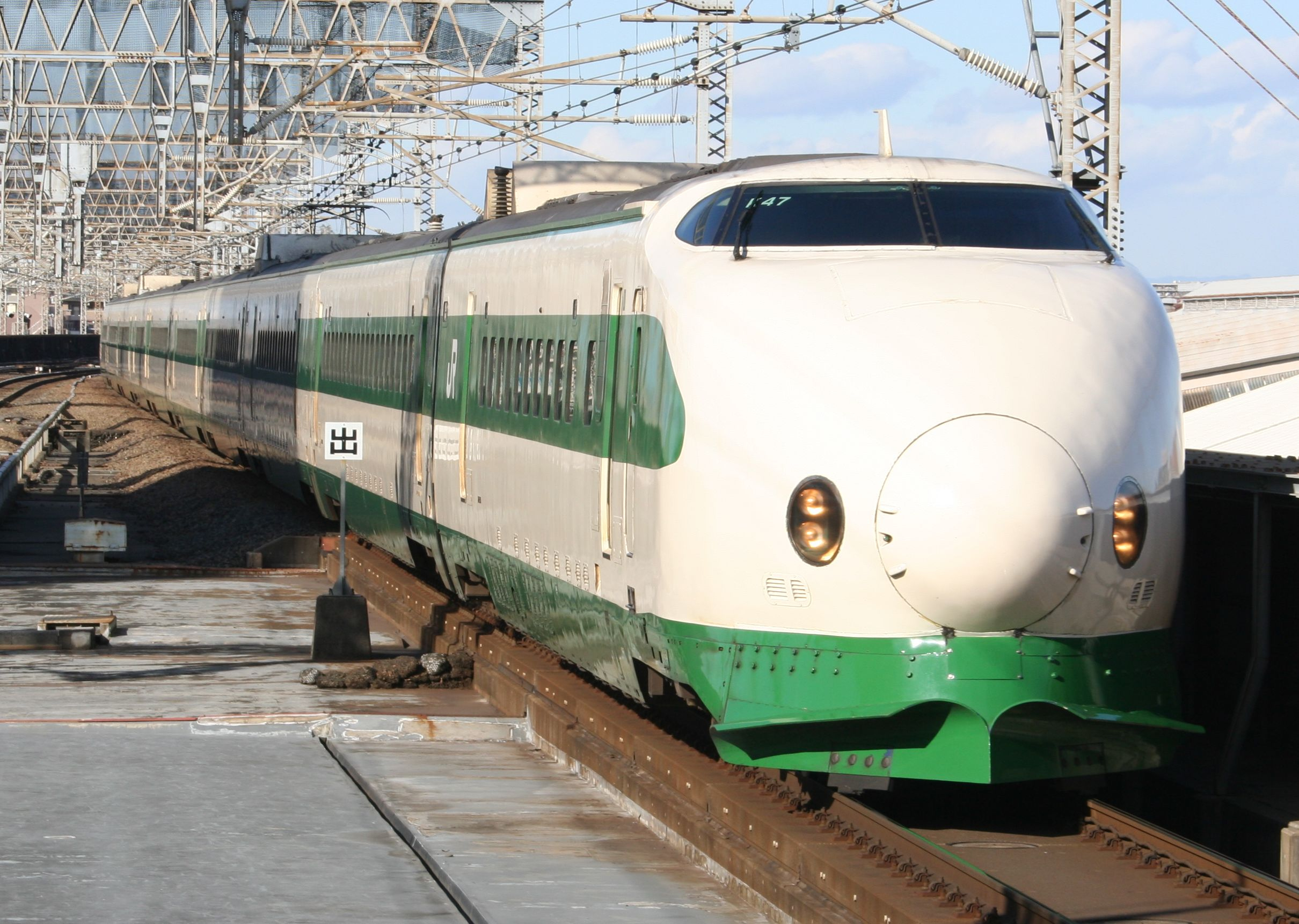
200 series trainset in January 2011

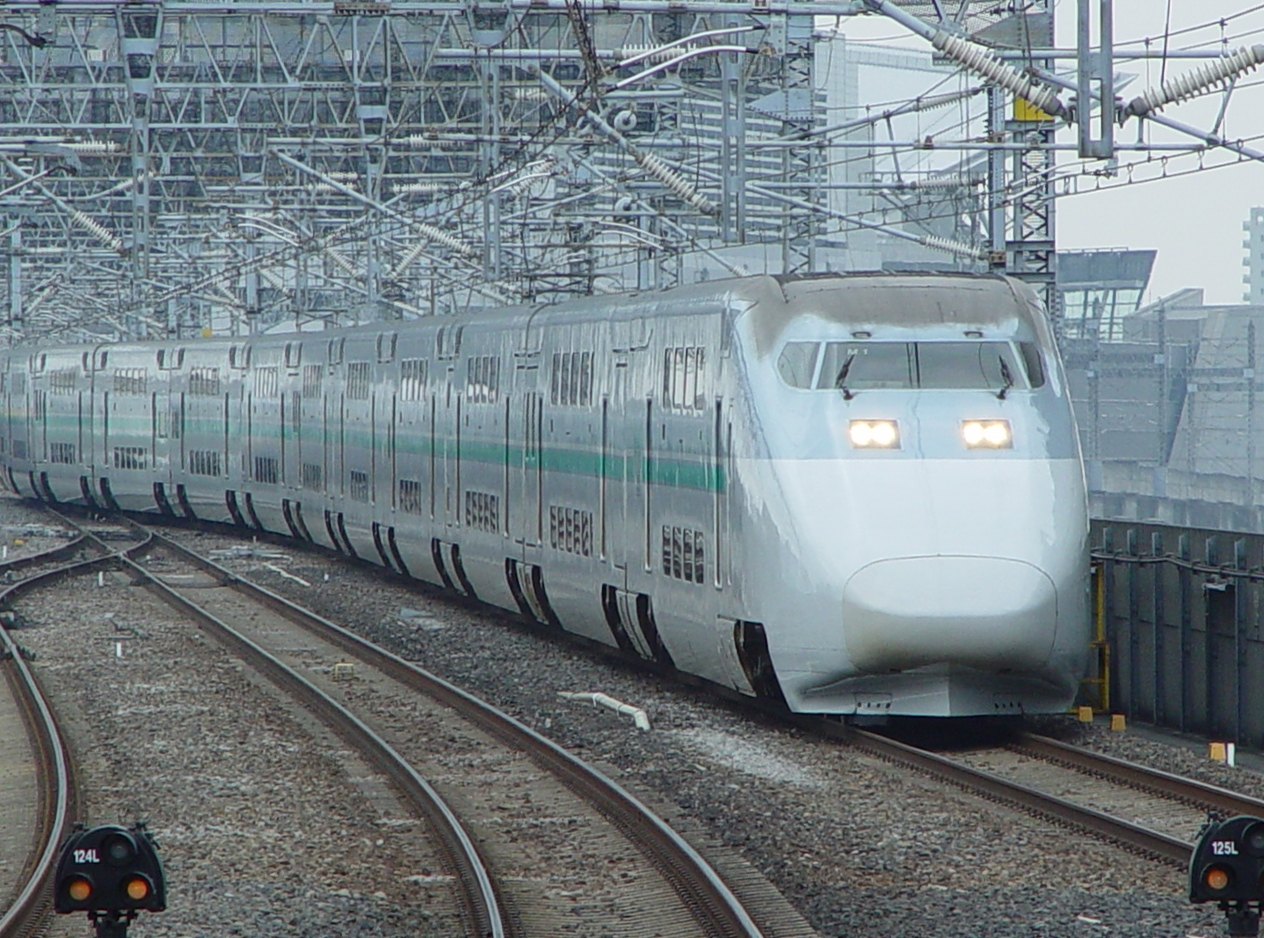
E1 series trainset in June 2002

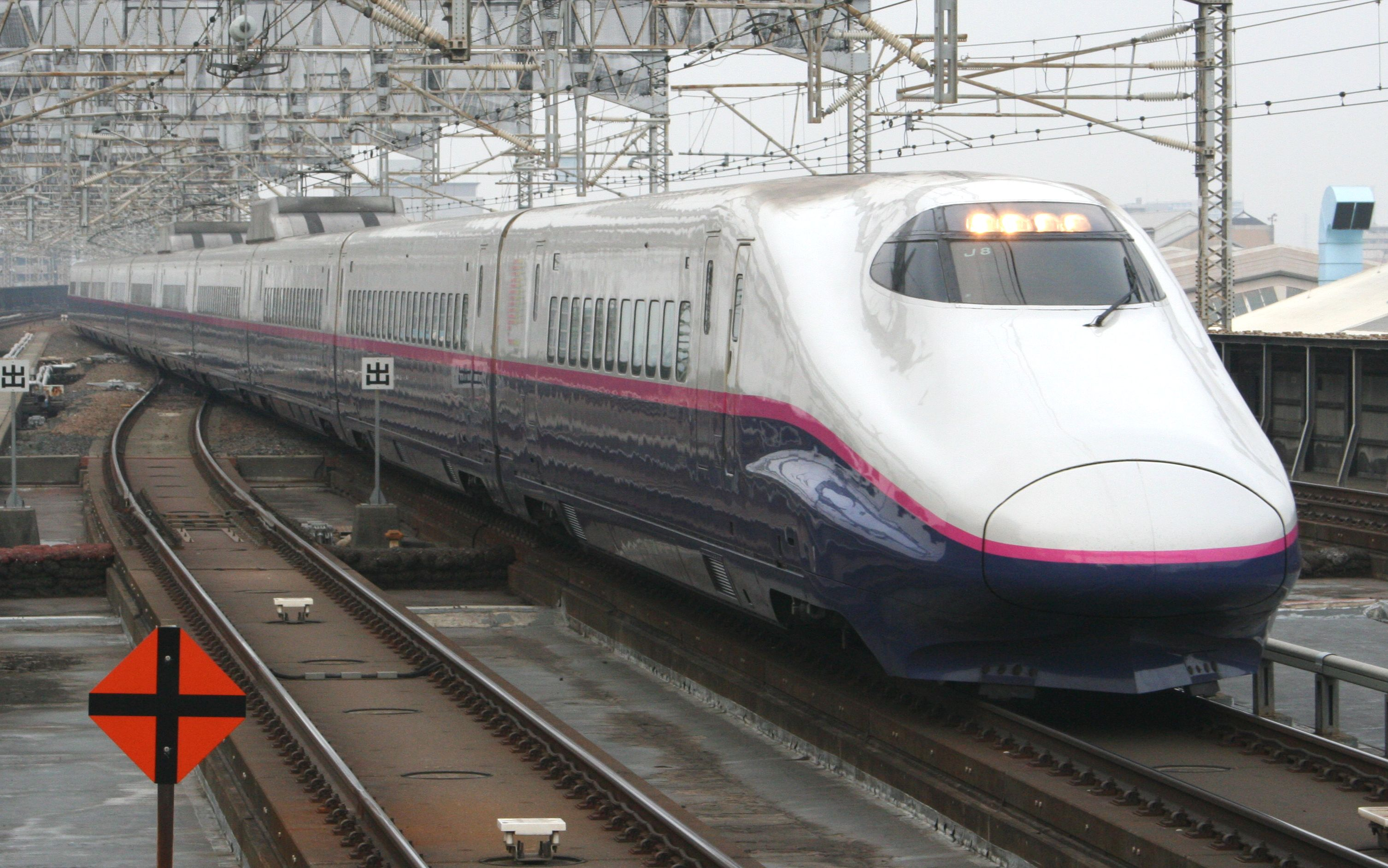
E2 series trainset in February 2011

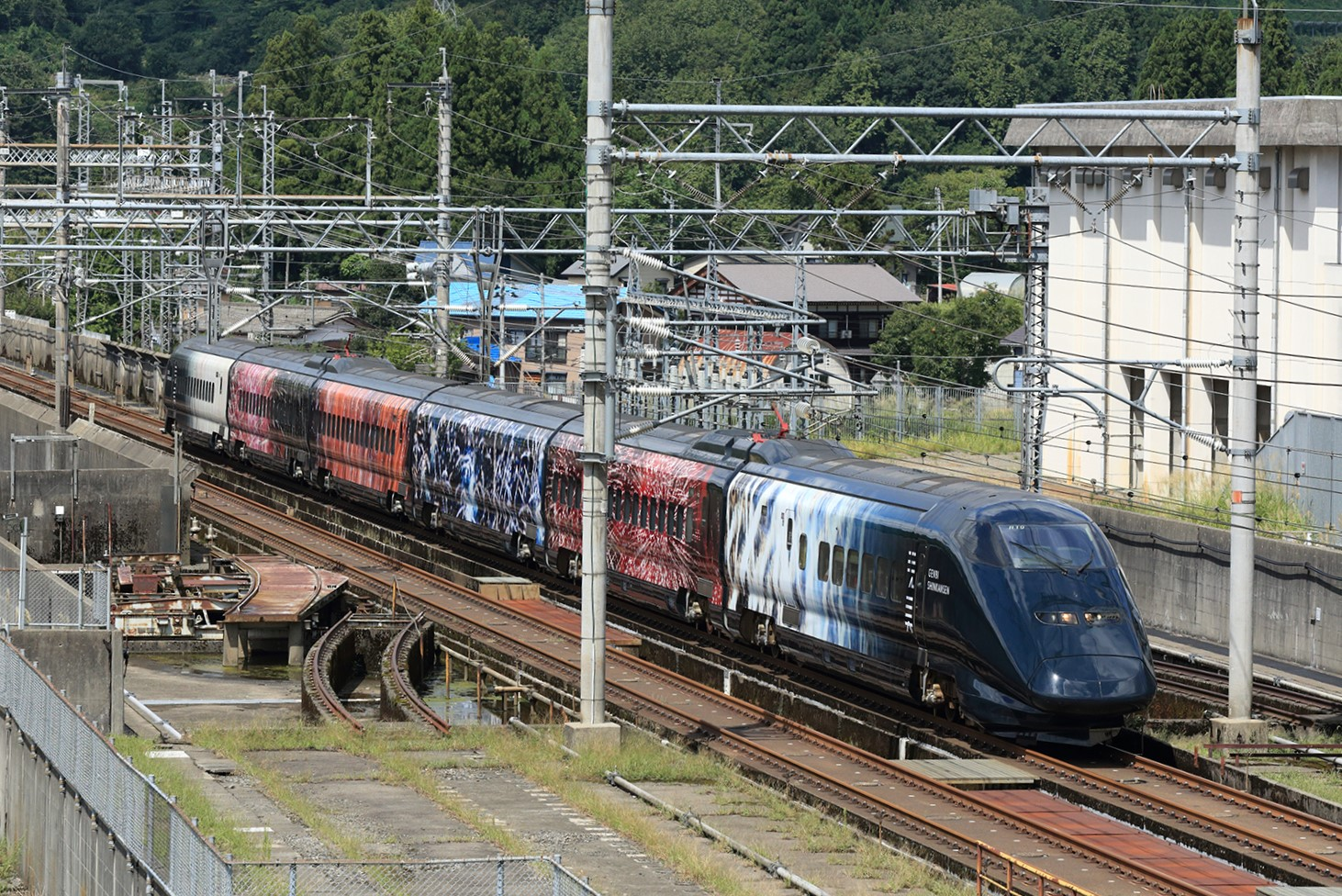
E3 series Genbi Shinkansen excursion trainset in September 2016

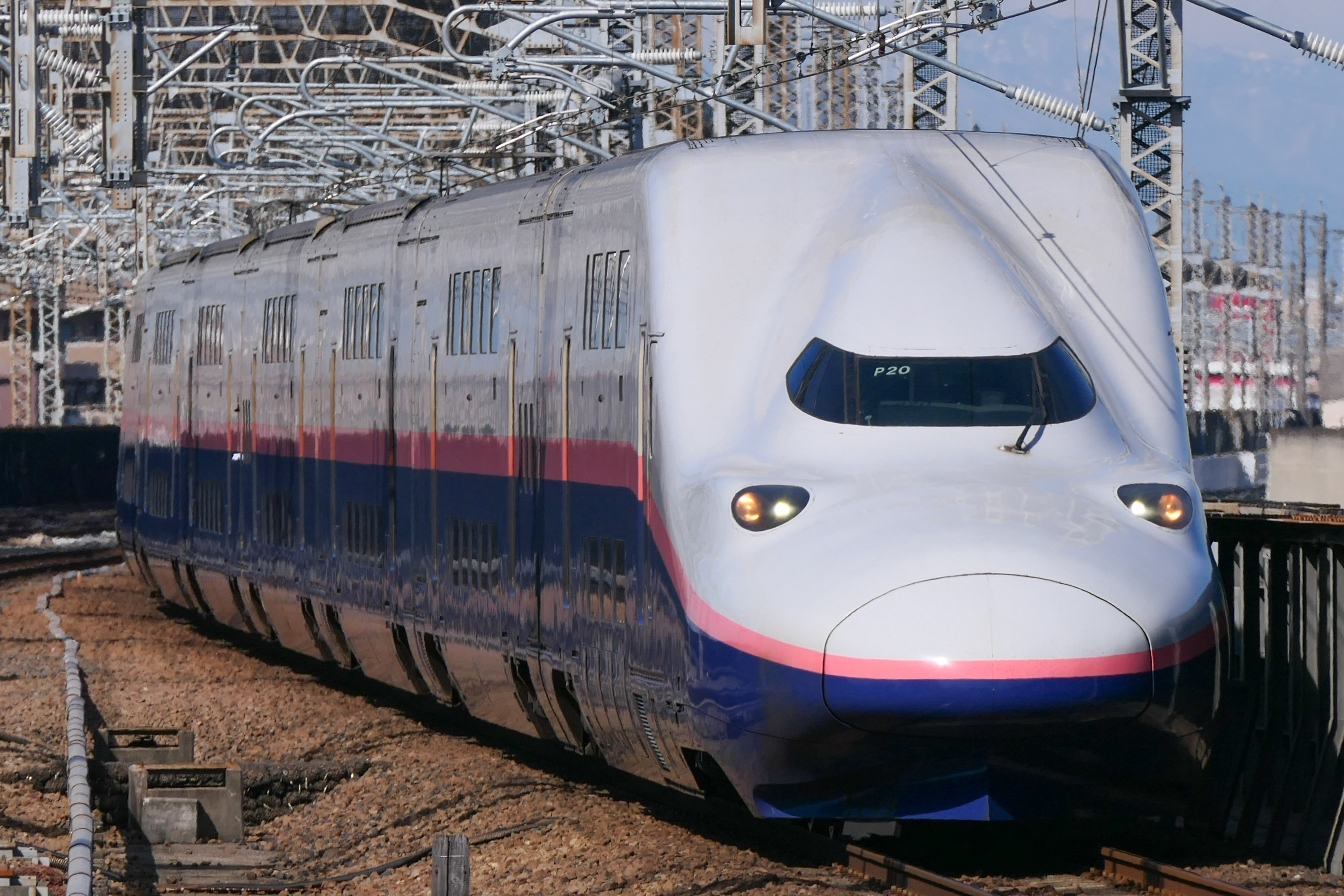
E4 series trainset in February 2021

== History ==
The program to build the new line was initiated in 1971 by Niigata-born prime minister Tanaka Kakuei; one popular anecdote is that Tanaka determined the line's routing by drawing it on a map with a red pencil. Built at a cost of $6.3 billion, it was built "to establish closer ties with Tokyo and promote regional development".

Trial runs over the line began in November 1980, and regular service began on 15 November 1982. The line was initially planned to terminate at Shinjuku Station, but economic considerations pushed Japanese National Railways (JNR) to merge the line with the existing Tōhoku Shinkansen line at Ōmiya.

In September 1991, a 400 Series Shinkansen train set a Japanese rail speed record of 345 km/h (214 mph) on the Jōetsu Shinkansen line, and in December 1993, the STAR21 experimental train recorded 425 km/h (264 mph). The maximum speed for regular services on the line at the time was 245 km/h (150 mph) except for the section between Jomo-Kogen and Urasa which is 275 km/h (171 mph) for E2 series trains travelling towards Niigata. The urban section between Tokyo and Ueno is 110 km/h (70 mph), between Ōmiya and Ueno is 130 km/h (80 mph).

The Basic Plan specifies that the Jōetsu Shinkansen should actually start from Shinjuku, which would necessitate building 30 km (19 mi) of additional Shinkansen track from Ōmiya. While some land acquisitions along the existing Saikyō Line were made, no construction ever started.

The entire line was upgraded to 275 km/h (171 mph), with construction starting in May 2019, and finished in 2023. Upgrades included improvements to the soundproofing system. This marks the first time that an E7 series train has operated commercially at more than 260 km/h (160 mph), which is the maximum speed of the only other line served by this train, the Hokuriku Shinkansen. As a result of the upgrades, all trainsets on the Jōetsu Shinkansen operate exclusively with E7 series trainsets and the travel time on the line is projected to be reduced by 7 minutes compared to the former E2 and E4 series trainsets. The end of E2 series trainsets on Jōetsu Shinkansen services took take place on 17 March 2023 with the streamlining of all services to use the E7 series taking place the following day.

=== Future plans ===
The Niigata prefectural government has proposed building a new multi-modal terminal to directly connect the Shinkansen to the port of Niigata, potentially allowing direct transfers to ferries and cruise ships, and to potentially allow direct access between the Shinkansen and Niigata Airport. However this plan is foreseen to be completed only by the mid-2040s.

== See also ==
- 2004 derailment of Joetsu Shinkansen
