= Chijire Glacier =

Glacier in Antarctica

- Location of Queen Maud Land in Antarctica

- Location within Antarctica
- Location: Queen Maud Land
- Coordinates: 68°3′S 43°23′E
- Thickness: unknown
- Status: unknown

Chijire Glacier (68°3′S 43°23′E) is a glacier flowing to the coast just east of Chijire Rocks in Queen Maud Land. It was mapped from surveys and air photos by the Japanese Antarctic Research Expedition, 1957–62, who also named it.

== See also ==
- List of glaciers in the Antarctic
- Glaciology
