= Niban Rock =

Niban Rock (68°14′S 42°28′E) is a rock which protrudes into the sea 8 nautical miles (15 km) southwest of Cape Hinode, on the coast of Queen Maud Land. Mapped from surveys and air photos by Japanese Antarctic Research Expedition (JARE), 1957–62, and named Niban-iwa (number two rock).
