= Otome Point =

Headland in Antarctica

Otome Point (68°8′S 42°36′E) is a point 2 nautical miles (3.7 km) southwest of Cape Hinode on the coast of Queen Maud Land. Mapped from surveys and air photos by Japanese Antarctic Research Expedition (JARE), 1957–62. The name "Otomenohana" or "Otome-no-hana" (girl's nose) was applied by JARE Headquarters in 1973.
