= Hinode Peak =

Coastal peak in the Antarctica

Hinode Peak (68°10′S 42°35′E) is a small coastal peak, 120 metres (390 ft) high, located 3 nautical miles (6 km) southwest of Cape Hinode on the coast of Queen Maud Land, Antarctica. It was mapped from surveys and air photos by the Japanese Antarctic Research Expedition, 1957–62, and named Hinode-yama (sunrise mountain).
