= Asachi =

Asachi (Romanian pronunciation: [aˈsaki]) is a Romanian surname that may refer to

- Elena Asachi (1789–1877), Romanian pianist, singer and composer, wife of Gheorghe
- Gheorghe Asachi (1788–1869), Moldavian-Romanian prose writer, poet, painter, historian, dramatist and translator
  - Gheorghe Asachi Technical University of Iași

== See also ==
- Asahi (disambiguation)
