= Asahi, Hokkaido =

Asahi 朝日町
- Town
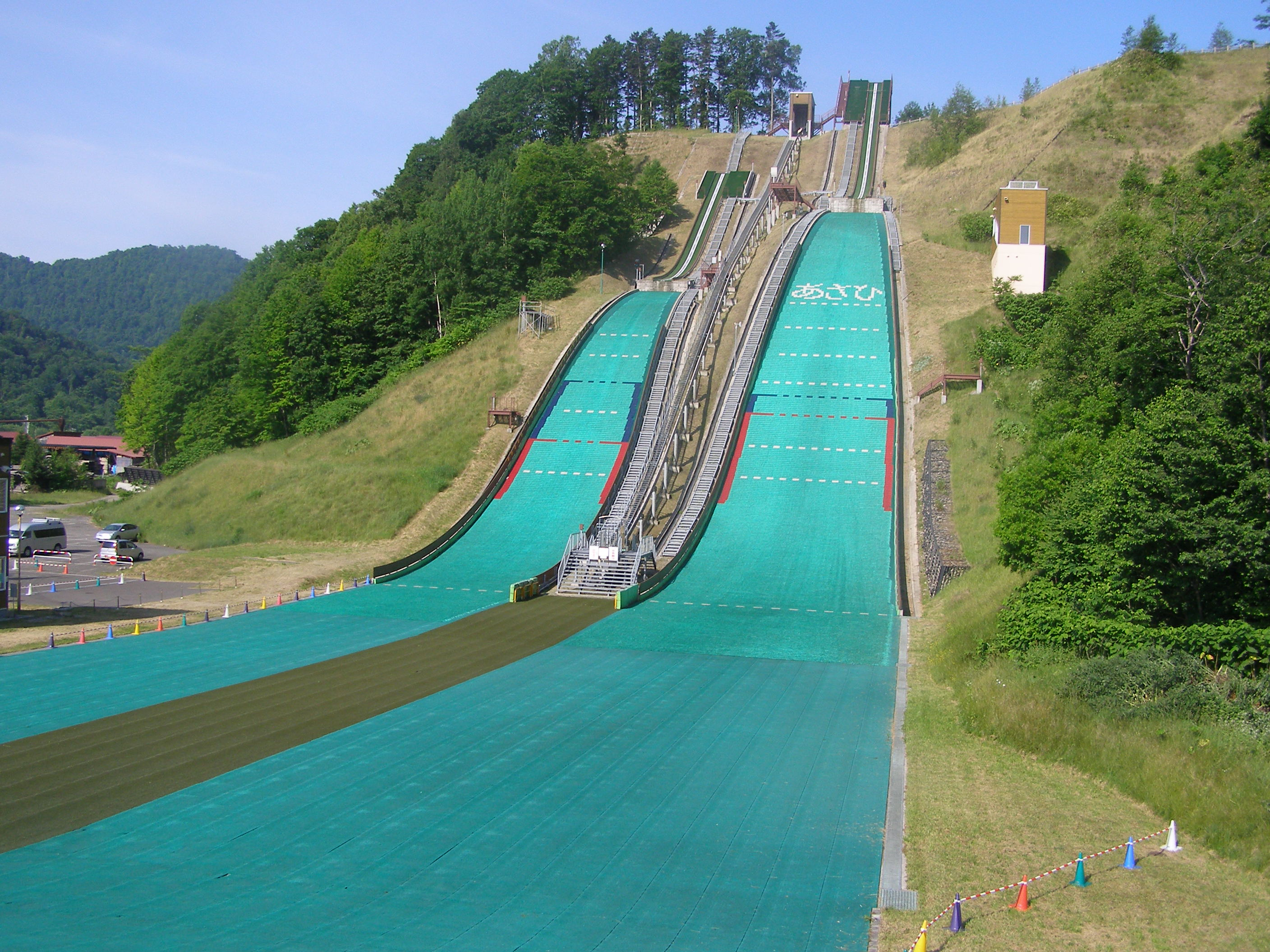
- Asahi-Sanbōdai-Schanze

- Flag Emblem

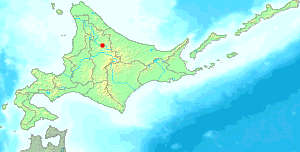
- Location of Asahi in Hokkaido (Kamikawa Subprefecture)

- Location in Japan
- Coordinates: 44°7′N 142°35′E
- Country: Japan
- Region: Hokkaido
- Prefecture: Hokkaido (Kamikawa Subprefecture)
- Now part of Shibetsu: September 1, 2005

Area
  - Total: 522.01 km^{2} (201.55 sq mi)

Population (2004)
  - Total: 1,799
  - Density: 3.45/km^{2} (8.9/sq mi)
- Time zone: UTC+09:00 (JST)
- City hall address: 10 of 4040 Central, Asahi-cho, Kamikawa-gun, Hokkaido; 095-0492
- Website: web.archive.org/web/20050403174703/http://www.hokkai.or.jp/asahi/
- Symbols
- Flower: Rhododendron dauricum
- Tree: Picea glehnii

Asahi (朝日町, Asahi-chō) was a town located in Kamikawa (Teshio) District, Kamikawa Subprefecture, Hokkaido, Japan.

As of 2004, the town had an estimated population of 1,799 and a density of 3.45 persons per km^{2}. The total area was 522.01 km^{2}.

On September 1, 2005, Asahi was merged into the expanded city of Shibetsu.

== History ==
- 1949: Asahi village was split from Kamishibetsu village (now Shibetsu city).
- 1962: Asahi village became a town.
- 2005: Asahi village merged with Shibetsu city.

== Climate ==
Climate data for Asahi, Hokkaido, elevation 225 m (738 ft), (1991−2020 normals, extremes 1977−present)
Month	Jan	Feb	Mar	Apr	May	Jun	Jul	Aug	Sep	Oct	Nov	Dec	Year
Record high °C (°F)	8.3 (46.9)	12.5 (54.5)	15.8 (60.4)	26.6 (79.9)	32.8 (91.0)	36.4 (97.5)	36.9 (98.4)	37.2 (99.0)	32.0 (89.6)	25.6 (78.1)	20.3 (68.5)	12.4 (54.3)	37.2 (99.0)
Mean daily maximum °C (°F)	−3.9 (25.0)	−2.8 (27.0)	1.8 (35.2)	9.4 (48.9)	17.5 (63.5)	22.1 (71.8)	25.6 (78.1)	25.6 (78.1)	21.2 (70.2)	13.9 (57.0)	5.3 (41.5)	−1.6 (29.1)	11.2 (52.1)
Daily mean °C (°F)	−8.0 (17.6)	−7.4 (18.7)	−2.9 (26.8)	3.9 (39.0)	10.9 (51.6)	15.8 (60.4)	19.7 (67.5)	20.0 (68.0)	15.2 (59.4)	8.3 (46.9)	1.5 (34.7)	−5.0 (23.0)	6.0 (42.8)
Mean daily minimum °C (°F)	−13.2 (8.2)	−13.3 (8.1)	−8.5 (16.7)	−1.6 (29.1)	4.5 (40.1)	10.1 (50.2)	14.8 (58.6)	15.4 (59.7)	10.0 (50.0)	3.4 (38.1)	−2.3 (27.9)	−9.3 (15.3)	0.8 (33.5)
Record low °C (°F)	−28.8 (−19.8)	−29.0 (−20.2)	−27.0 (−16.6)	−14.7 (5.5)	−4.8 (23.4)	−0.7 (30.7)	3.5 (38.3)	4.6 (40.3)	0.1 (32.2)	−5.8 (21.6)	−17.1 (1.2)	−26.3 (−15.3)	−29.0 (−20.2)
Average precipitation mm (inches)	48.2 (1.90)	37.1 (1.46)	47.3 (1.86)	49.4 (1.94)	69.5 (2.74)	73.1 (2.88)	139.2 (5.48)	149.1 (5.87)	151.0 (5.94)	123.1 (4.85)	104.8 (4.13)	76.2 (3.00)	1,067.9 (42.04)
Average precipitation days (≥ 1.0 mm)	17.2	13.8	14.5	11.6	11.5	9.7	11.3	11.9	13.5	16.4	19.0	20.0	170.4
Mean monthly sunshine hours	59.5	77.8	117.3	154.4	193.1	172.5	166.1	156.4	151.2	118.6	53.3	38.1	1,460.6
Source: JMA
