= Akebono Rock =

Exposed rock in Queen Maud Land, Antarctica

Akebono Rock (68°4′S 42°55′E) is a substantial area of exposed rock just east of the mouth of Akebono Glacier on the coast of Queen Maud Land. Mapped from surveys and air photos by the Japanese Antarctic Research Expedition, 1957–1962, who also gave the name.
