= Bōhyō Heights =

Mountains in Antarctica

The Bōhyō Heights (68°8′S 42°42′E) are a small, rocky elevation that overlooks the coast of Queen Maud Land 2 nautical miles (4 km) east-southeast of Cape Hinode. They were mapped from surveys and from air photos by the Japanese Antarctic Research Expedition (JARE), 1957–62, and the name "Bōhyō-dai" (ice view heights) was given by JARE Headquarters in 1973.
