= Asahi (automobile) =

Overview
- Manufacturer: Miyata
- Production: 1937-1939

Body and chassis
- Class: Light car
- Body style: Two-seat
- Layout: Front-wheel drive

Powertrain
- Engine: 730 cc (45 cu in) 2-cylinder

The Asahi was a light car made by Miyata from 1937 to about 1939. It was powered by a 730 cc 2-cylinder engine that drove the front wheels. It had a two-seater body and independent suspension all around.
