= Jōmō-Kōgen Station =

Railway station in Japan

Coordinates: 36°41′36″N 138°58′39″E

Jōmō-kōgen Station 上毛高原駅
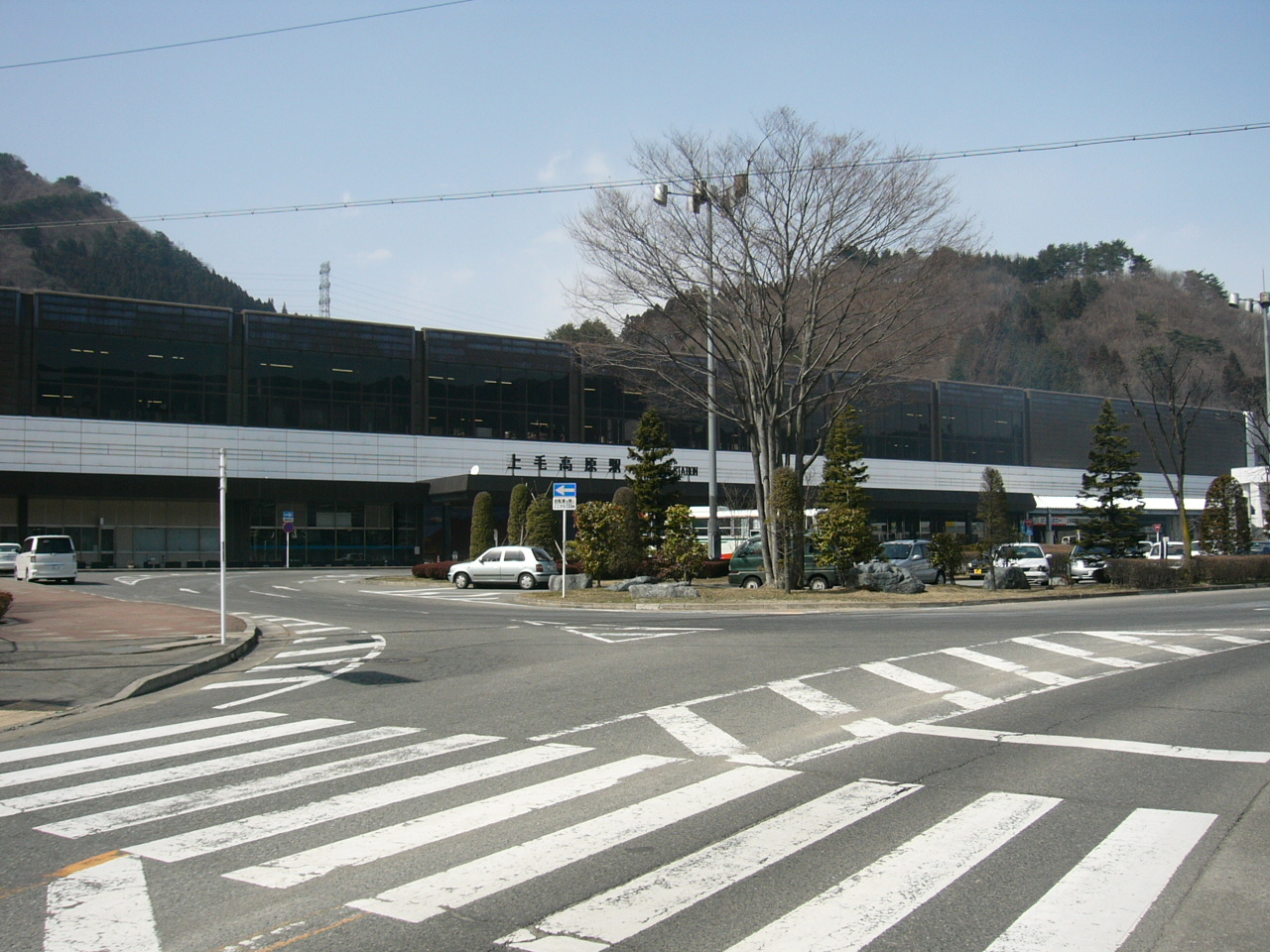

General information
- Location: Tsukiyono, Minakami, Tone District, Gunma; Japan
- Operator: JR East
- Line: Jōetsu Shinkansen
- Platforms: 2 side platforms
- Tracks: 2
- Connections: Bus stop

Construction
- Structure type: Elevated

History
- Opened: 15 November 1982; 43 years ago

Passengers
- 2021: 415 (Daily)

Services
Preceding station	JR East	Following station
Takasaki towards Tokyo	Jōetsu Shinkansen Toki	Echigo-Yuzawa towards Niigata
Takasaki towards Tokyo	Jōetsu Shinkansen Tanigawa	Echigo-Yuzawa towards Gala-Yuzawa
Location
- Location within Gunma Prefecture Location within Japan

Jōmō-Kōgen Station (上毛高原駅, Jōmō-kōgen-eki) is a railway station on the high-speed Joetsu Shinkansen in Minakami, Gunma, Japan, operated by the East Japan Railway Company (JR East).

== Station layout ==
The elevated station has two side platforms serving two tracks. There are also two middle tracks for passing trains.

=== Platforms ===
1	■ Joetsu Shinkansen	for Takasaki, Ōmiya, and Tokyo
2	■ Joetsu Shinkansen	for Echigo-Yuzawa, Nagaoka, and Niigata

== History ==
The station opened on 15 November 1982.

== Future plans ==
On 15 September 2022, a formal petition was made to JR East to change the name of the station to include the name Minakami (みなかみ). Proponents for the name change proposal state that the current name does not accurately describe the area in which the station is located. The campaign included the submission of 15,000 signatures.

== Passenger statistics ==
In fiscal 2006, the station was used by an average of 732 passengers daily (boarding passengers only).

== Bus services ==
=== Highway Buses ===
- Kan-etsu Kotsu Bus
  - "Minakami Onsen Line"
    - For Shinjuku Station via Kawagoe Station

=== Route buses ===
- Kan-etsu Kotsu Bus
  - For Minakami Station and Tanigawadake Ropeway via Kamimoku Station
  - For Numata Station, Kamata and Oze-Tokura via Gokan Station

== Surrounding area ==
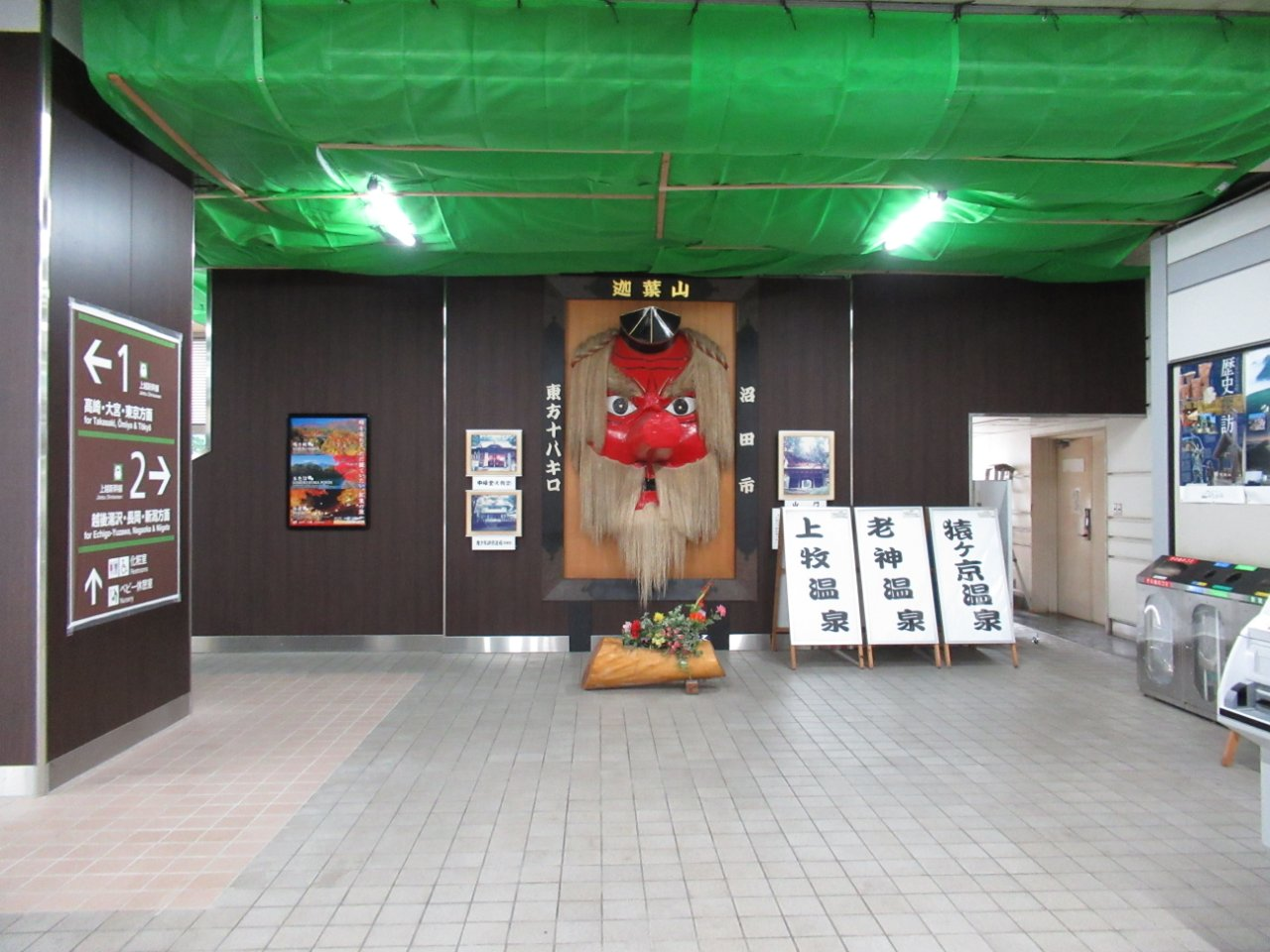
tourist information and tengu （Kasyōzan Miroku temple）

The station is located nearby Sarugakyō Mikuni Onsen, Kamimoku Onsen, Namesawa Onsen and Oigami Onsen.

== See also ==
- List of railway stations in Japan
