= Cape Hinode =

Cape on the coast of Queen Maud Land, Antarctica

Cape Hinode (68°7′S 42°38′E) is a rock cape 3 nautical miles (6 km) west of Akebono Glacier on the coast of Queen Maud Land, Antarctica. The cape and many of its nearby features were mapped and named from surveys and air photos by the Japanese Antarctic Research Expedition, 1957–62. The name Hinode-misaki means "sunrise cape".

== Nearby features ==
Kikko Terrace rises on the coast about 1.5 nmi (3 km) to the south-southeast. The Bōhyō Heights overlook the coast 2 nmi (4 km) east-southeast of Cape Hinode. Penguin Heights is a low, rocky elevation about 1 nmi (2 km) southwest of the cape. Otome Point sits on the coast about 2 nmi (4 km) to the southwest.

Nearby inland features include Maigo Peak, situated 1.5 nmi (3 km) east-southeast of Cape Hinode, and Hinode Peak, 3 nmi (6 km) to the southwest.

A pair of large rocks called the Meoto Rocks lie off the coast just west of Cape Hinode. off the coast of Queen Maud Land, Antarctica. "Meotoiwa" means "husband and wife rocks". Niban Rock protrudes into the sea 8 nmi (15 km) to the southwest,
