= E2 Series Shinkansen =

Japanese high speed train series

E2 series
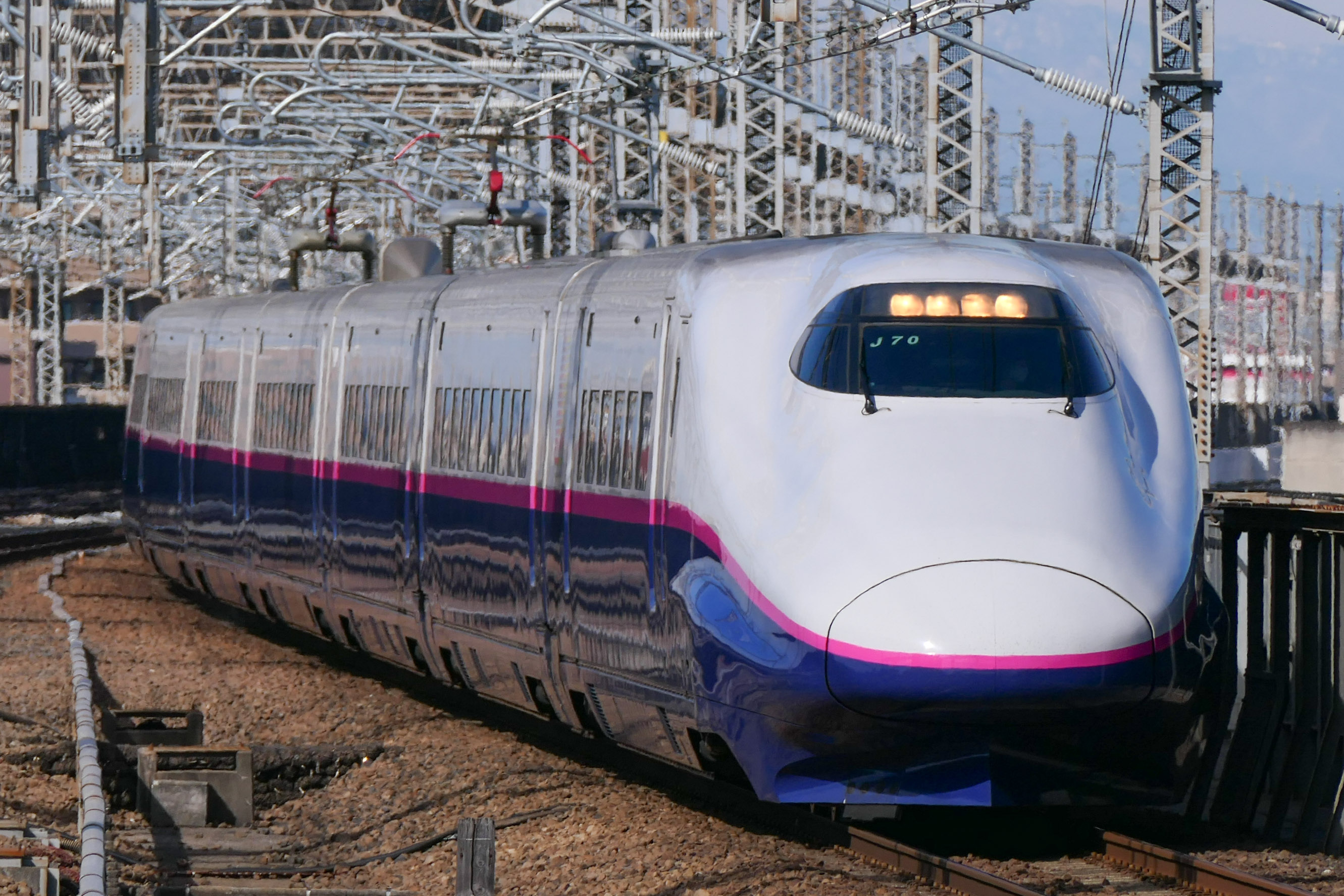
- E2 series train near Omiya Station
- In service: 22 March 1997; 29 years ago – present
- Manufacturers: Hitachi; Kawasaki Heavy Industries; Nippon Sharyo; Tokyu Car Corporation
- Replaced: 200 series
- Constructed: 1995–2005, 2010
- Entered service: 22 March 1997
- Refurbished: 2002 (E2-0 series J sets)
- Scrapped: 2013-
- Number built: 502 vehicles (53 sets)
- Number in service: 60 vehicles (6 sets) (as of 1 April 2025)
- Number preserved: 3 vehicles
- Number scrapped: 439 vehicles (47 sets)
- Successor: E5/H5 series; E7/W7 series; E10 series (planned)
- Formation: 8/10 cars per trainset
- Fleet numbers: J1–15, J51–J75, N1–13, N21, H66
- Capacity: 10-car J sets: 814–815 (51 Green); 8-car N sets: 630 (51 Green + 579 Standard)
- Operator: JR East
- Depots: Sendai, Nagano (formerly), Niigata (formerly)
- Lines served: Tohoku Shinkansen; Hokuriku Shinkansen (1997 – 2017); Joetsu Shinkansen (2013 – 2023)

Specifications
- Car body construction: Aluminium
- Car length: 25.7 m (84 ft 4 in) (end cars); 25 m (82 ft 0 in) (intermediate cars)
- Width: 3.38 m (11 ft 1 in)
- Height: 3.7 m (12 ft 2 in)
- Doors: 2 per side
- Maximum speed: 275 km/h (171 mph) (Tohoku Shinkansen); 260 km/h (162 mph) (Hokuriku Shinkansen); 240 km/h (149 mph) (Joetsu Shinkansen)
- Traction system: (AC) MT205 (24 x 300 kW (402 hp) per 8-car train, 32 x 300 kW (402 hp) per 10-car train)
- Power output: 7.2 MW (9,655 hp) (for 8-car train), 9.6 MW (12,874 hp) (for 10-car train)
- Electric system: 25 kV AC, 50/60 Hz overhead catenary
- Current collection: Pantograph
- Safety systems: ATC-2, DS-ATC
- Multiple working: E3 series (formerly)
- Track gauge: 1,435 mm (4 ft 8 1/2 in) standard gauge

The E2 series (Japanese: E2系) is a Japanese high-speed Shinkansen train type introduced in 1997 by East Japan Railway Company (JR East) for use on the Tōhoku and Hokuriku Shinkansen high-speed lines in Japan. They are formed in 8- and 10-car sets. The 8-car sets were used on the Hokuriku Shinkansen, and the 10-car sets have been used on Tōhoku Shinkansen services. The 10-car sets are fitted with couplers hidden behind retracting nose doors, formerly used for coupling to E3 series sets.

They operate at a maximum speed of 275 km/h (171 mph) on the Tohoku Shinkansen.

A total of 502 vehicles (14 8-car "N" sets and 39 10-car "J" sets) were built between 1997 and 2010, with the first withdrawals commencing in late 2013.

As of 1 April 2025, the active fleet consisted of six 10-car E2-1000 series sets, numbered J70 to J75.

== Operations ==
=== Tohoku Shinkansen ===
- Yamabiko
- Nasuno

=== Past operations ===
==== Tohoku Shinkansen ====
- Hayate (1 December 2002 - 16 March 2019)

==== Hokuriku Shinkansen ====
- Asama (1 October 1997 - 31 March 2017)

==== Joetsu Shinkansen ====
- Asahi
- Toki
- Tanigawa

== Variants ==
- E2 series 8-car "N" sets
- E2' series 10-car "J" sets
- E2-1000 series 10-car "J" sets

== 8-car "N" sets ==
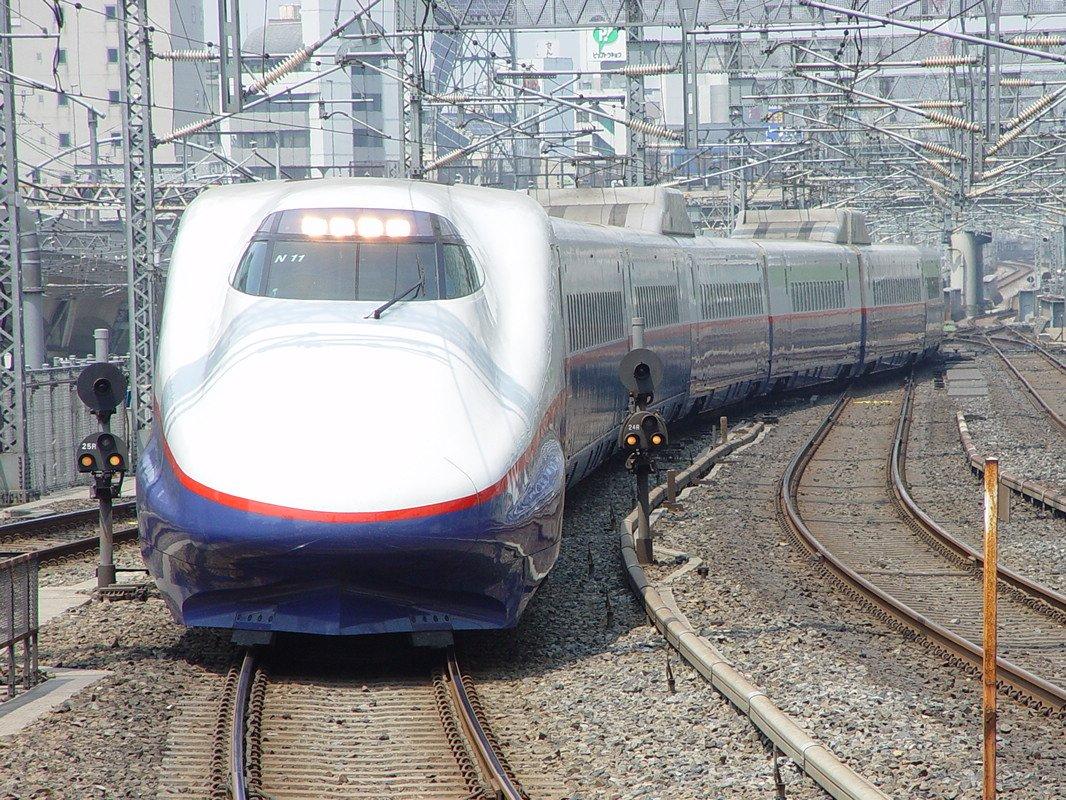
8-car set N11 on an Asama service in June 2002

The fleet of thirteen "N" sets was constructed for the new Asama services on the newly constructed Nagano Shinkansen (present-day Hokuriku Shinkansen) to Nagano from 1 October 1997, and are classified simply "E2 series". Units N2 onwards were delivered from March 1997 to September 1997. These sets are compatible with both the 50 Hz supply used by JR East and the 60 Hz supply used west of Karuizawa on the Hokuriku Shinkansen, and are limited to a maximum speed of 260 km/h (162 mph). Tohoku Shinkansen set J1 was transferred to Nagano depot in October 2002 and renumbered as set N21.

The fleet of "N" sets underwent a programme of life-extension refurbishment from fiscal 2013.

Withdrawals of E2 series "N" sets commenced in April 2014, with the withdrawal of sets N4 and N12. The remaining E2 series sets were removed from regularly scheduled Hokuriku Shinkansen Asama services from 25 December 2015, with the last E2 series Asama run taking place on 31 March 2017.

=== Formation ===
Car No.	1	2	3	4	5	6	7	8
Designation	T1c	M2	M1	M2	M1k	M2	M1s	T2c
Numbering	E223	E226-100	E225	E226-200	E225-400	E226-300	E215	E224
Seating capacity	55	100	85	100	75	100	51	64

Cars 4 and 6 are equipped with PS205 scissors-type pantographs.

=== Fleet list ===
As of 1 October 2017, the fleet was as follows:

Set number	Manufacturer	Date delivered	Date withdrawn	Remarks
N1		6 June 1995	9 July 2014	Pre-series set S6
N2	Kawasaki HI	25 March 1997	1 September 2014	
N3	Hitachi	16 April 1997	1 December 2014	
N4	Kawasaki HI	25 April 1997	23 April 2014	
N5	Nippon Sharyo	14 May 1997	1 June 2017	
N6	Hitachi	29 May 1997	17 June 2014	
N7	Nippon Sharyo	13 June 1997	25 January 2016	
N8	Kawasaki HI	27 June 1997	26 May 2014	
N9	Hitachi	11 July 1997	26 September 2014	
N10	Nippon Sharyo	25 July 1997	17 February 2016	
N11	Hitachi	8 August 1997	1 August 2014	
N12	Tokyu Car	25 August 1997	2 April 2014	
N13	Kawasaki HI	5 September 1997	11 May 2017	
N21	-	14 April 1995	6 January 2015	Pre-series set S7, later J1

== E2' series 10-car "J" sets ==
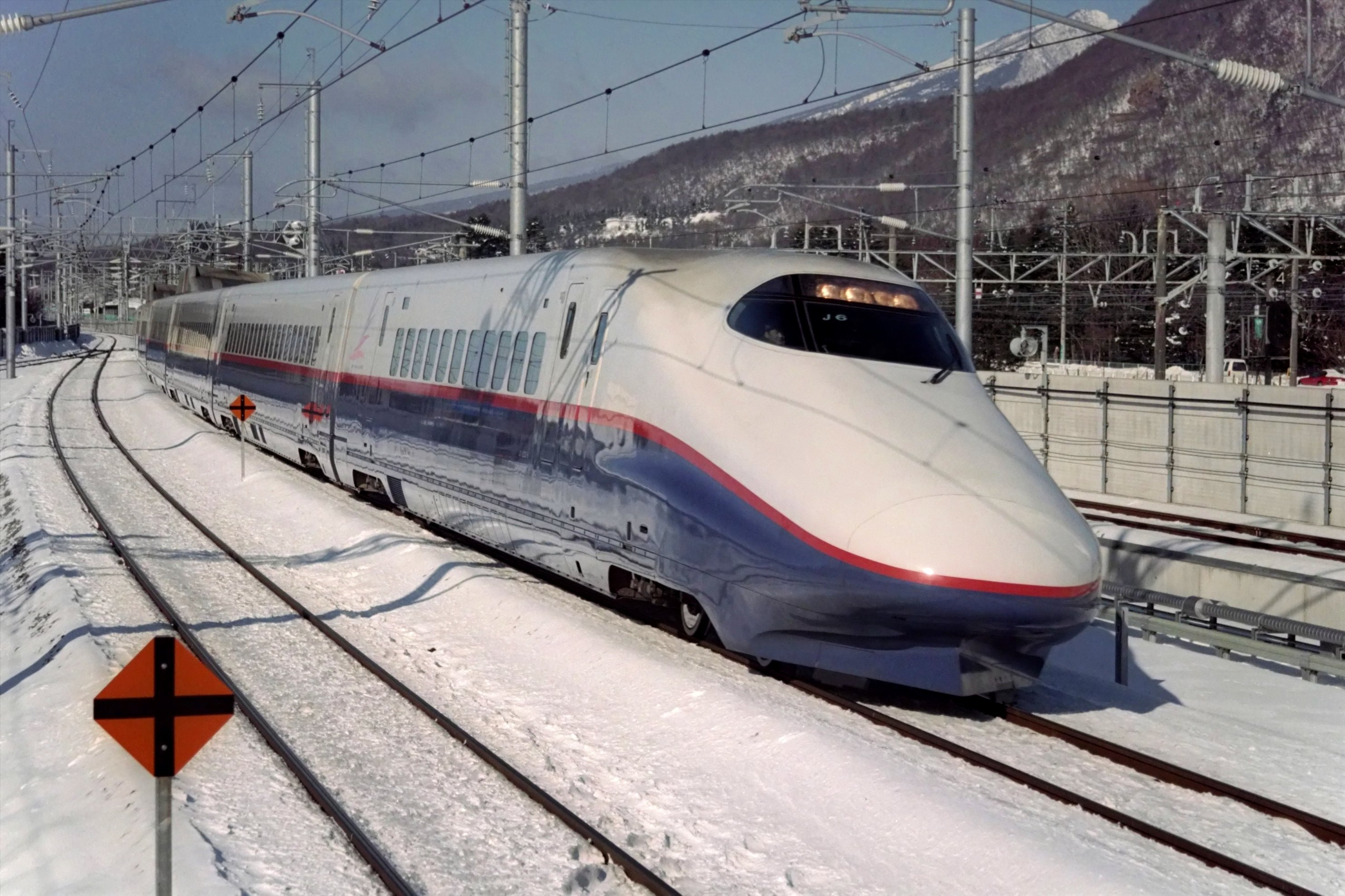
8-car set J6 in original livery on an Asama service in February 1998

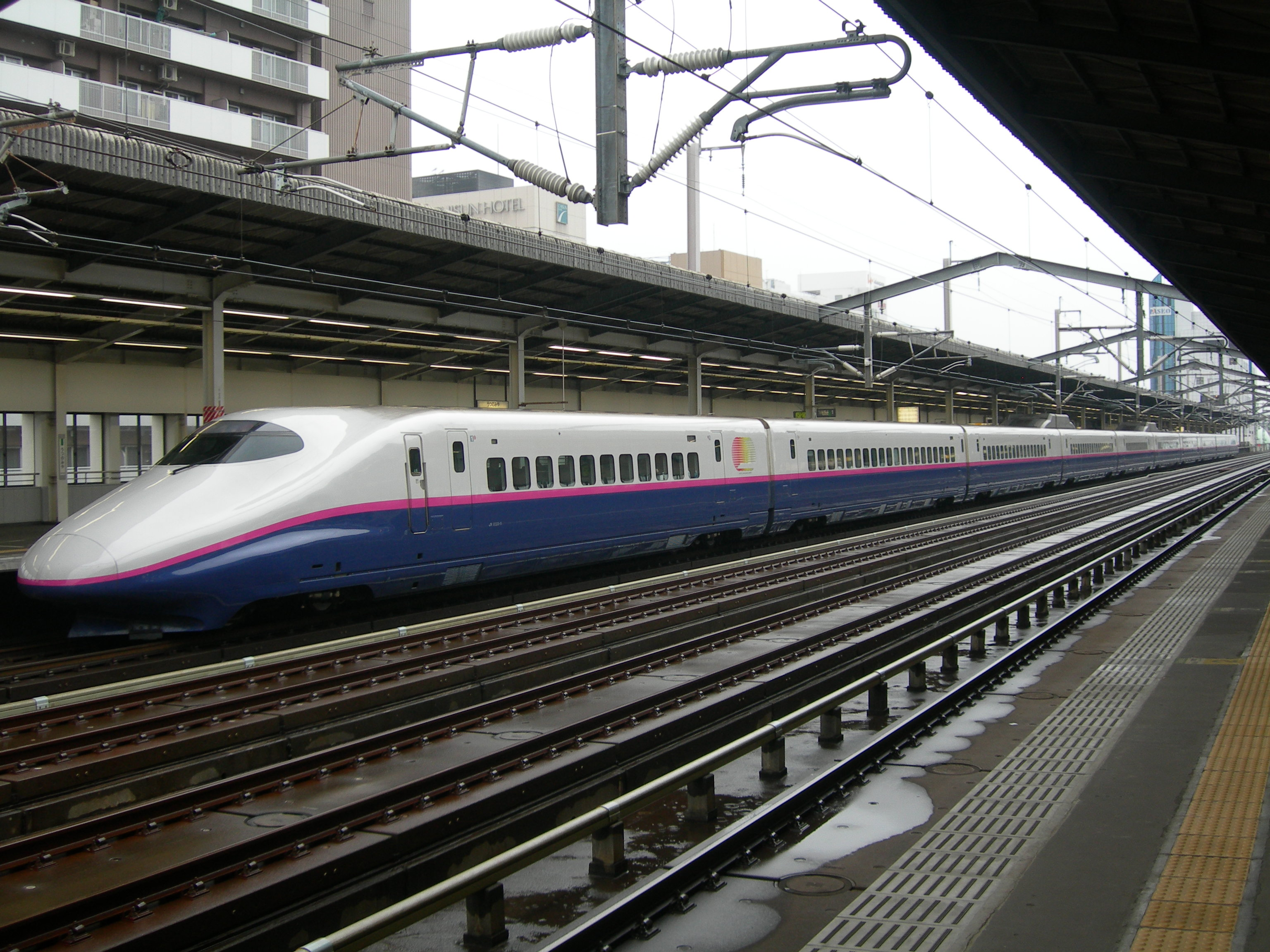
10-car J set in revised livery in September 2008

The initial fleet of six "J" sets was constructed as eight-car trains for the start of the new Akita shinkansen services starting in March 1997, and ran in conjunction with E3 series Akita Shinkansen units on Tōhoku Shinkansen Yamabiko/Komachi services between Tokyo and Morioka. These sets are classified E2', and are equipped with retractable nose-end couplers at the Morioka end. Units J2 onwards were delivered from December 1996 to March 1997.

As with the Nagano Shinkansen N units, these sets are also compatible with both 50 Hz and 60 Hz (25 kV) power supplies, and were also used on Nagano Shinkansen Asama services before they were lengthened to ten cars. A further four J sets were delivered in October/November 1998 to augment the fleet to coincide with the introduction E2 series stock on four return Asahi services between Tokyo and Niigata on the Jōetsu Shinkansen from the start of the revised timetable in December 1998. From September 2002, the fleet of J sets (except J1) was augmented from 8 to 10 cars with the addition of newly built intermediate cars for use on Hayate services to Hachinohe commencing in December 2002. The red stripe on these lengthened sets was also changed to magenta, and the original "wind" bodyside logo was changed to the new Hayate logo.

Withdrawals of E2 series "J" sets commenced in October 2013, with the withdrawal of sets J2 and J3. The last remaining original "J" sets were withdrawn before the start of the revised timetable on 16 March 2019.

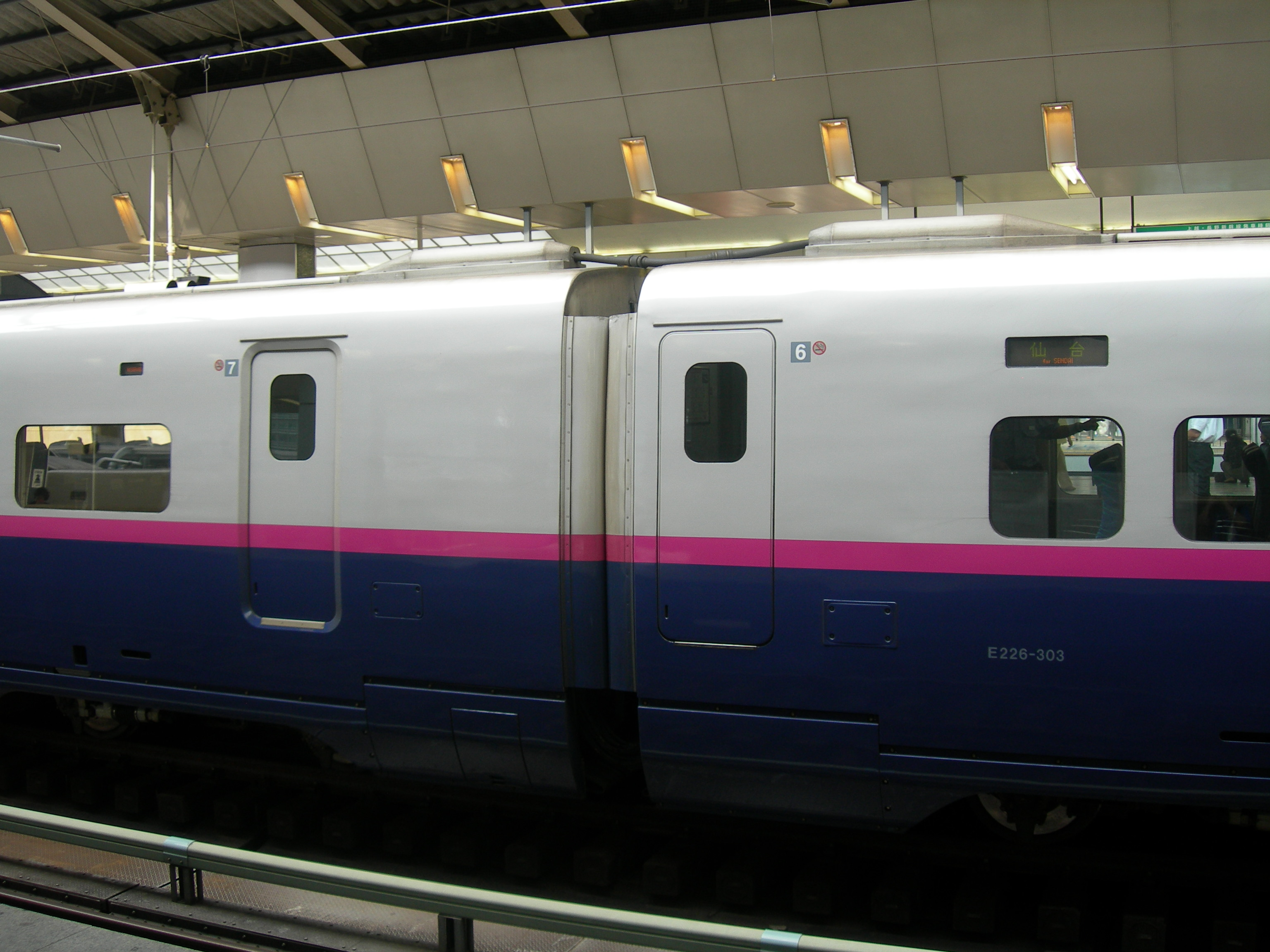
View showing new-build car 7 (E225-100) next to original car 6 (E226-300) in July 2008

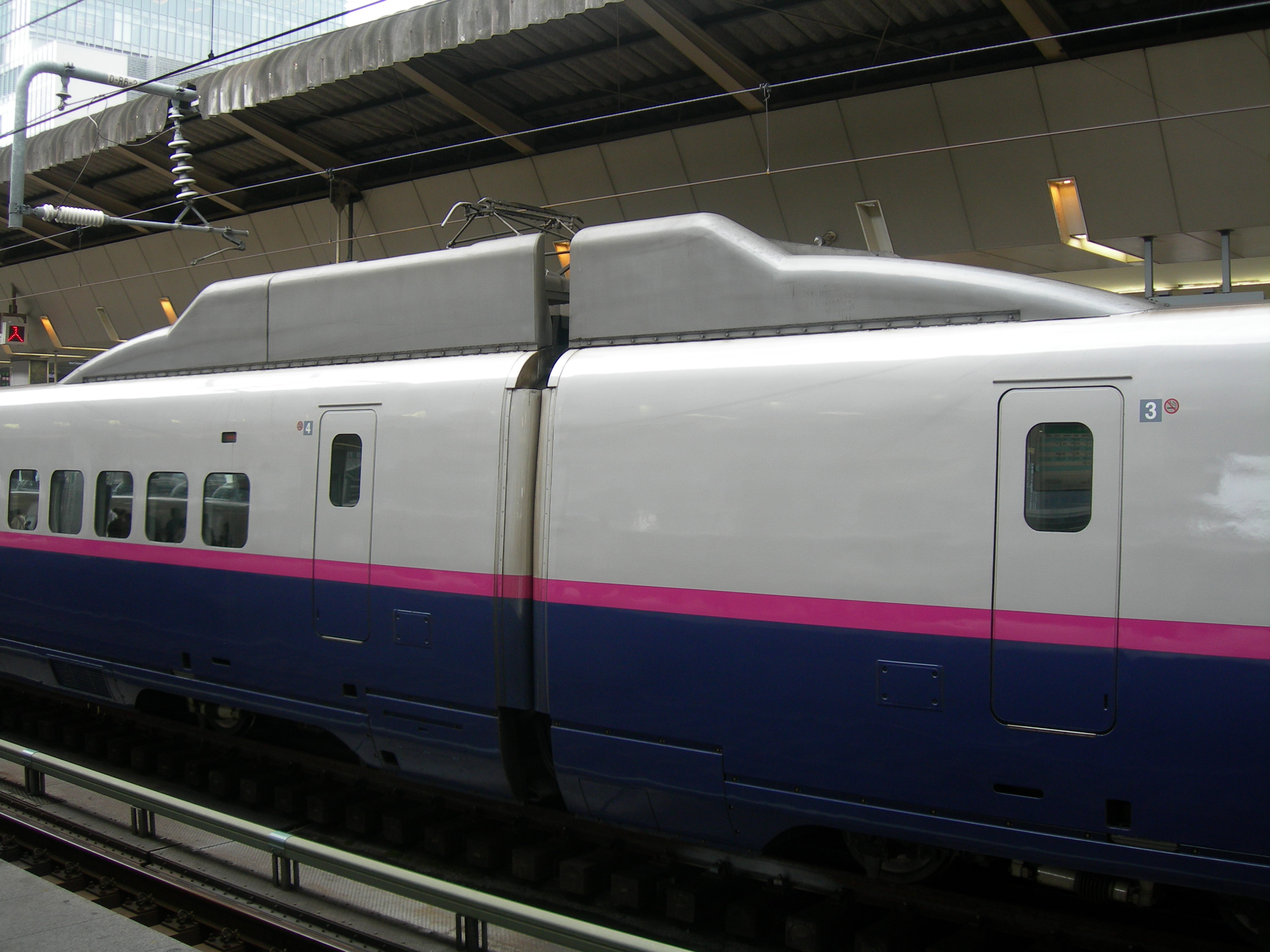
Pantograph installation on an E2 series J set in July 2008

=== Formation ===
Car No.	1	2	3	4	5	6	7	8	9	10
Designation	T1c	M2	M1	M2	M1k	M2	M1	M2	M1s	T2c
Numbering	E223	E226-100	E225	E226-200	E225-400	E226-300	E225-100	E226-400	E215	E224-100
Seating capacity	55	100	85	100	75	100	85	100	51	64

Cars 4 and 6 are equipped with PS205 scissors-type pantographs.

=== Fleet list ===
Set number	Manufacturer	Date delivered	Date lengthened to 10 cars	Date withdrawn
J1	-	14 April 1995	(Pre-series set S7, renumbered N21 from October 2002)	16 March 2019
J2	Hitachi	20 December 1996	19 December 2002	2 October 2013
J3	Hitachi	24 January 1997	24 December 2002	30 October 2013
J4	Kawasaki HI	12 February 1997	19 September 2002	8 February 2016
J5	Nippon Sharyo	3 March 1997	29 October 2002	12 June 2014
J6	Nippon Sharyo	17 March 1997	3 November 2002	2 May 2014
J7	Nippon Sharyo	5 October 1998	16 November 2002	21 August 2017
J8	Hitachi	20 October 1998	24 September 2002	31 May 2018
J9	Nippon Sharyo	23 November 1998	14 September 2002	8 April 2016
J10	Kawasaki HI	17 December 1998	14 October 2002	14 February 2017
J11	Nippon Sharyo	6 September 1999	21 November 2002	9 January 2019
J12	Tokyu Car	17 September 1999	29 September 2002	23 August 2019
J13	Hitachi	5 October 1999	4 October 2002	27 April 2018
J14	Kawasaki HI	19 October 1999	19 October 2002	7 November 2018
J15	Tokyu Car	5 November 1999	24 October 2002	17 May 2019

== E2-1000 series 10-car "J" sets ==
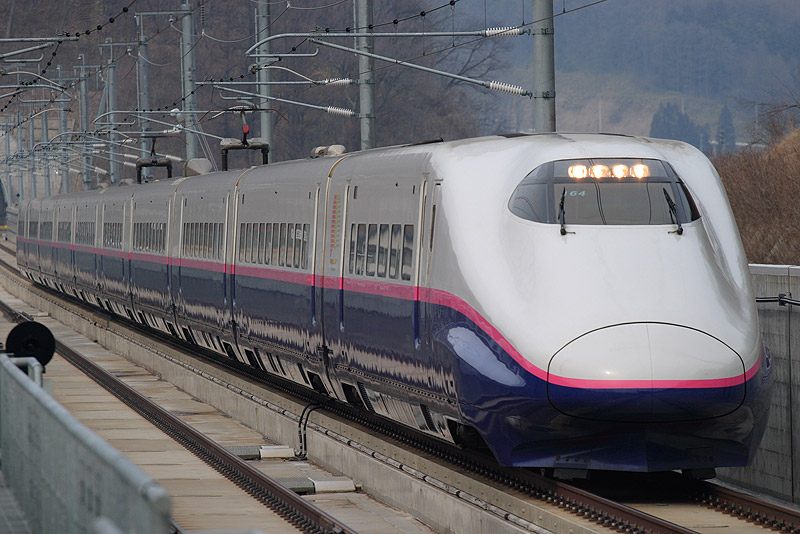
E2-1000 series set J64 on Hayate service at Iwate-Numakunai Station in March 2007

The prototype E2-1000 series train (unit J51) was delivered as an 8-car to Sendai depot in late December 2000, and entered revenue-earning service in November 2001 after extensive testing. Units J52 onwards were delivered as 10-car units from July 2002, entering service on the Tohoku Shinkansen from December 2002. These trains replaced life-expired 200 series trains and augment JR East's fleet for use on new Hayate services following the opening of the Tōhoku Shinkansen extension to Hachinohe in December 2002.

The E2-1000 series incorporates a number of design improvements compared with the earlier batches, the most noticeable of which is the change from small windows for each seating bay to wide windows similar to the E4 series trains. A new single-arm pantograph design is used with an aerofoil-shaped mounting that eliminates the need for pantograph shrouds. The pre-series set, J51, was equipped with automatic couplers at both ends, but sets J52 onwards have couplers at the northern end only, as on the earlier E2' trains. Unlike the earlier J sets, these units are only compatible with the 50 Hz power supply of the Tohoku and Joetsu Shinkansen routes and they are not equipped with slope-usable brake systems. The flush-fitting plug doors of the earlier N and J sets were replaced by conventional sliding doors on these units. While J51 was delivered in the same livery as earlier E2 series trains, units J52 onward were delivered from new in the Hayate livery with a magenta waistline stripe in place of the previous red and a new "apple" logo in place of the "wind" logo on the original batch of J and N units.

Withdrawals of E2-1000 series sets commenced in March 2019, beginning with set J51.

Effective 18 March 2023, all sets have been withdrawn from Joetsu Shinkansen services and restricted to services on the Tohoku Shinkansen as a result of operating speed upgrades on the Joetsu Shinkansen; from 240 to 275 km/h (149 to 171 mph).

From the 16 March 2024 timetable revision, the Yamabiko portions coupled with Tsubasa services between Tokyo and Fukushima were changed from E2 series to E5 series operation following the introduction of E8 series trains on the Yamagata Shinkansen.

=== Formation ===
Car No.	1	2	3	4	5	6	7	8	9	10
Designation	T1c	M2	M1	M2	M1k	M2	M1	M2	M1s	T2c
Numbering	E223-1000	E226-1100	E225-1000	E226-1200	E225-1400	E226-1300	E225-1100	E226-1400	E215-1000	E224-1100
Seating capacity	54	100	85	100	75	100	85	100	51	64

Cars 4 and 6 are equipped with PS207 single-arm pantographs. Car 1 of set No. J51 is numbered E223-1101.

=== Fleet list ===
Set number	Manufacturer	Date delivered	Date withdrawn
J51	Hitachi/Kawasaki HI/Nippon Sharyo/Tokyu Car	13 January 2001	14 March 2019
J52	Hitachi	17 July 2002	14 March 2022
J53	Kawasaki HI	5 August 2002	9 May 2022
J54	Kawasaki HI	8 March 2003	April 2023
J55	Hitachi	7 November 2002	27 October 2022
J56	Hitachi	23 November 2002	10 August 2022
J57	Nippon Sharyo	4 October 2003	24 March 2023
J58	Tokyu Car	11 September 2003	4 February 2023
J59	Tokyu Car	21 October 2003	18 March 2023
J60	Kawasaki HI	24 December 2003	October 2023
J61	Nippon Sharyo	17 January 2004	August 2023
J62	Kawasaki HI	2 February 2004	7 July 2023
J63	Tokyu Car	8 December 2003	31 May 2023
J64	Hitachi	11 June 2003	19 December 2023
J65	Kawasaki HI	10 March 2004	24 November 2022
J66	Nippon Sharyo	6 April 2005	15 March 2024
J67	Hitachi	7 June 2005	17 October 2024
J68	Hitachi	10 July 2005	26 September 2024
J69	Kawasaki HI	5 December 2005	1 October 2024
J70	Hitachi	19 February 2010	
J71	Nippon Sharyo	11 March 2010	
J72	Hitachi	12 April 2010	
J73	Kawasaki HI	10 May 2010	
J74	Kawasaki HI	7 June 2010	
J75	Nippon Sharyo	27 September 2010	

== Pre-series units ==
The pre-series E2' series unit S7 (renumbered as J1 and later as N21) was delivered in April 1995, with S6 (now numbered as N1) delivered in June of the same year. Visually, these two units differed from subsequent production standard units in having large pantograph shields resembling the original 300 series design. These were later changed to the current low-profile design. Before its retirement in 2015, car E926-13 of the East-i was rarely inserted into set N21 for track inspection purposes when the East-i was being maintained.

== Interior ==
Seating is 2+3 in standard class with a seat pitch of 960 mm (38 in), and 2+2 in green class with a seat pitch of 1,160 mm (46 in).

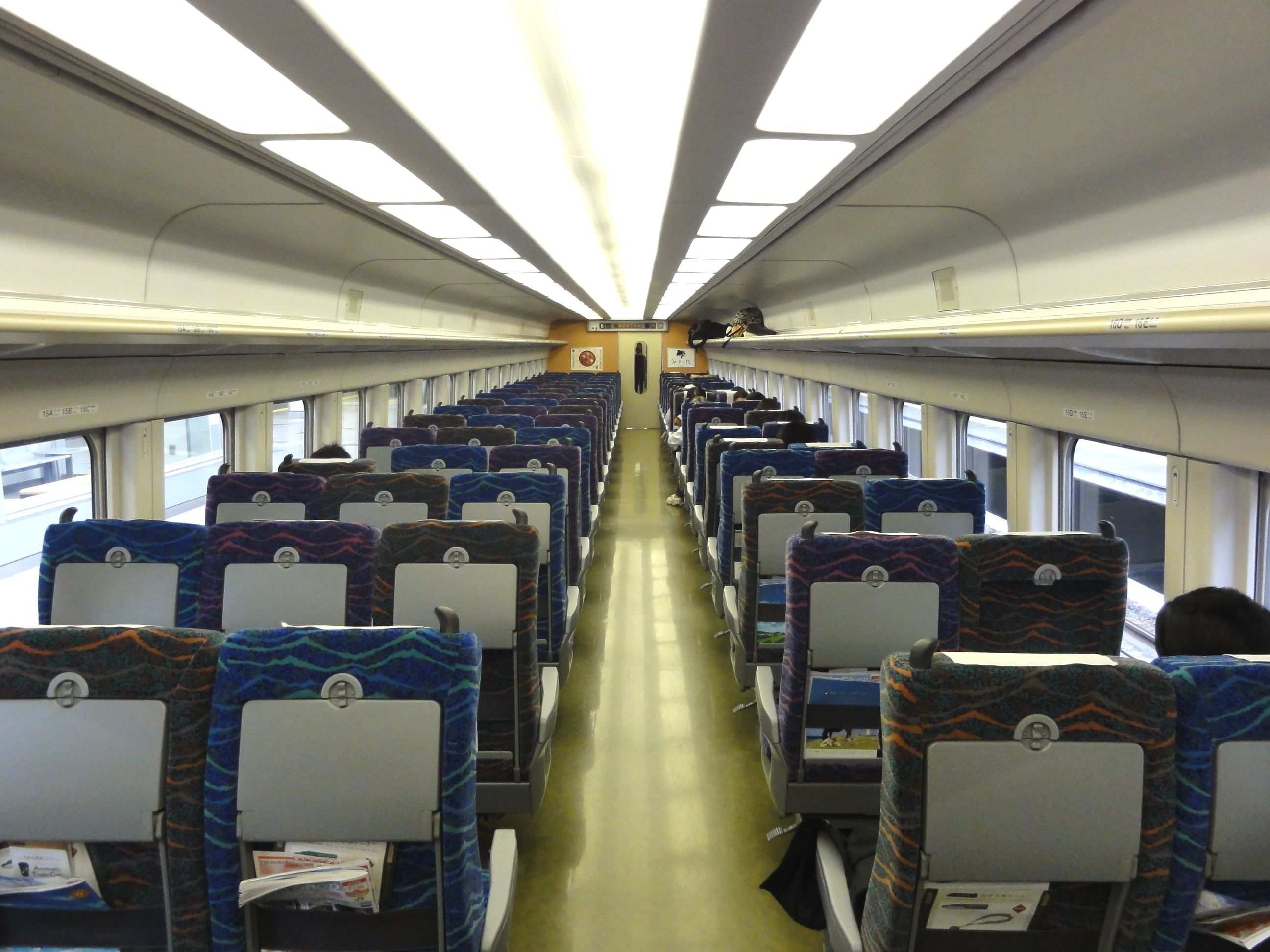
Standard seating with a 3+2 configuration

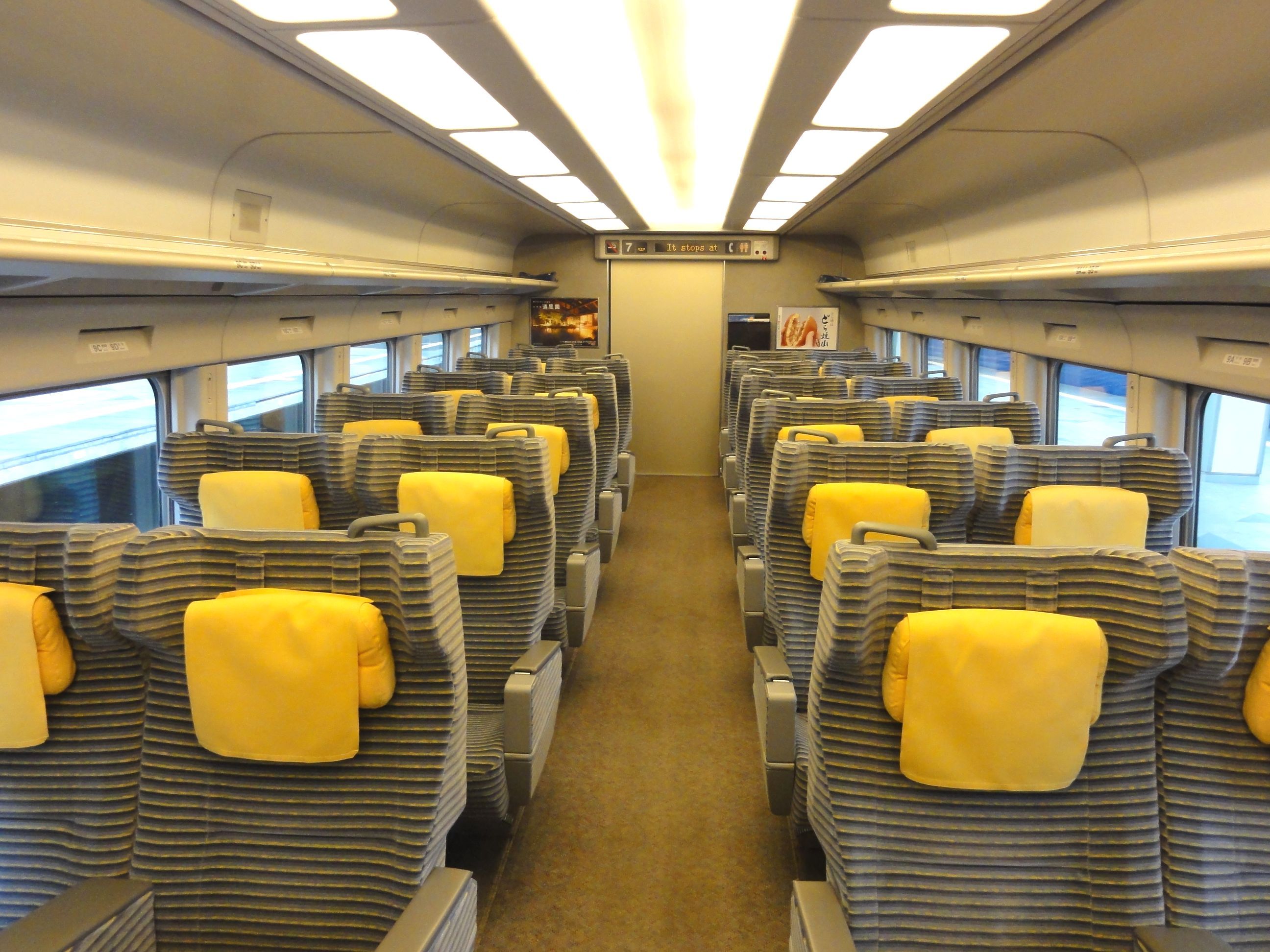
Inside a Green Car carriage with 2+2 configuration

== Test running ==
An E2-1000 series train (J56) broke the Japanese rail speed record for a production train (i.e. not a dedicated test train) in April 2003 when it reached a speed of 362 km/h (225 mph) during a series of late-night high-speed test runs between Urasa and Niigata on the Joetsu Shinkansen. This train was modified to allow high speed operation, such as changes to the gear ratio and ATC. Also, the effectiveness of new pantograph covers and sound-absorbing bogie covers was tested.

== Special liveries ==
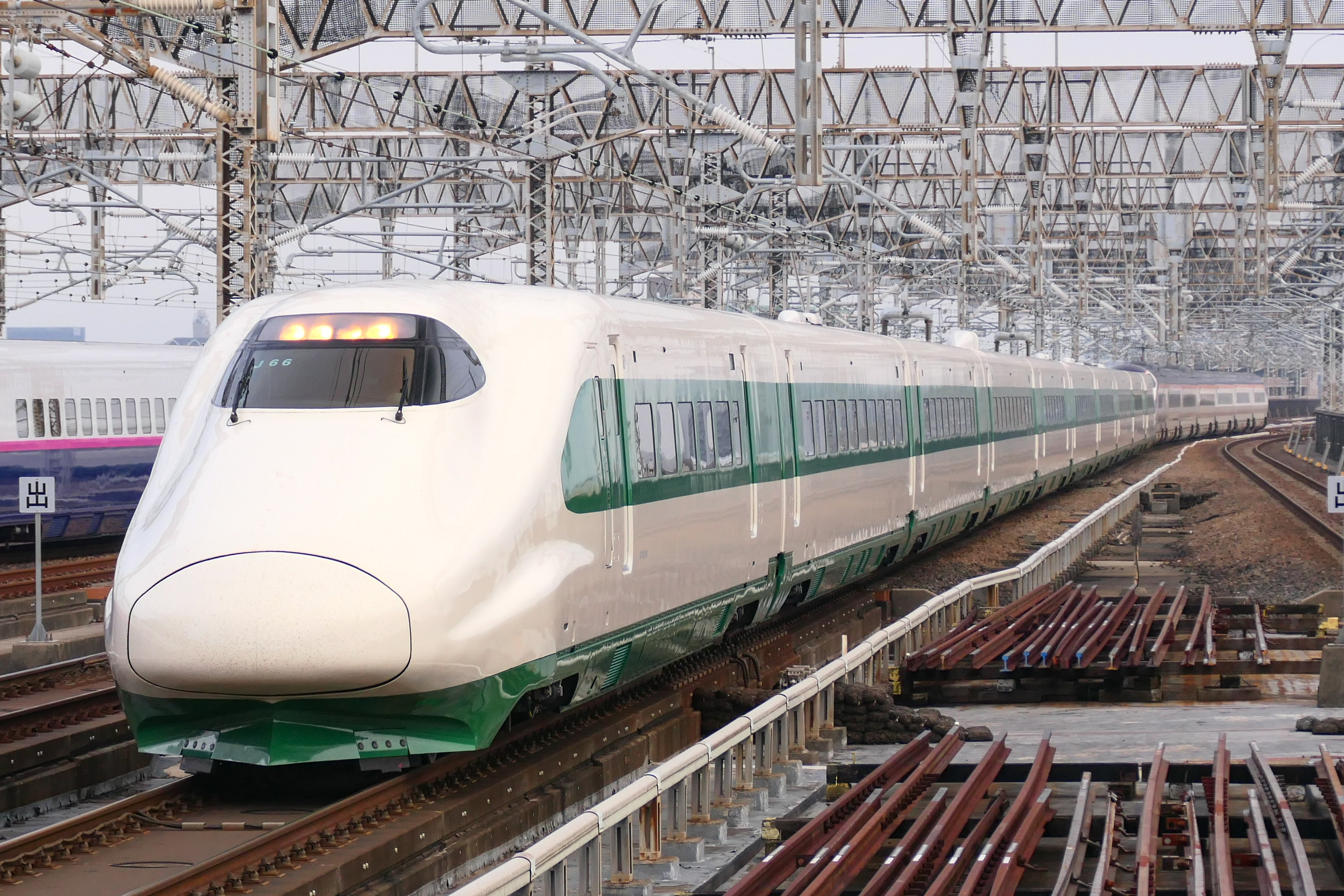
Set J66 painted in the commemorative livery, June 2022

To celebrate 150 years of rail transport in Japan, JR East announced plans in 2022 to repaint a set into a livery similar to that of the 200 series when they first entered service in 1982. The special livery was painted on set J66 and introduced on 8 June 2022. Set J66 was withdrawn on 15 March 2024, a day before the start of the revised timetable on 16 March 2024. J66 was later shipped to Hakodate in Hokkaido in April 2025, where it was rebuilt into a test train and renumbered as H66.

To celebrate the 40th anniversary of the Tokyo Disney Resort, set J69 was wrapped with a Disney-themed wrap, featuring artworks of Disney characters. Set J69 with the special wrap, nicknamed the Magical Dream Shinkansen, was introduced on 22 December 2023.

== Exports ==
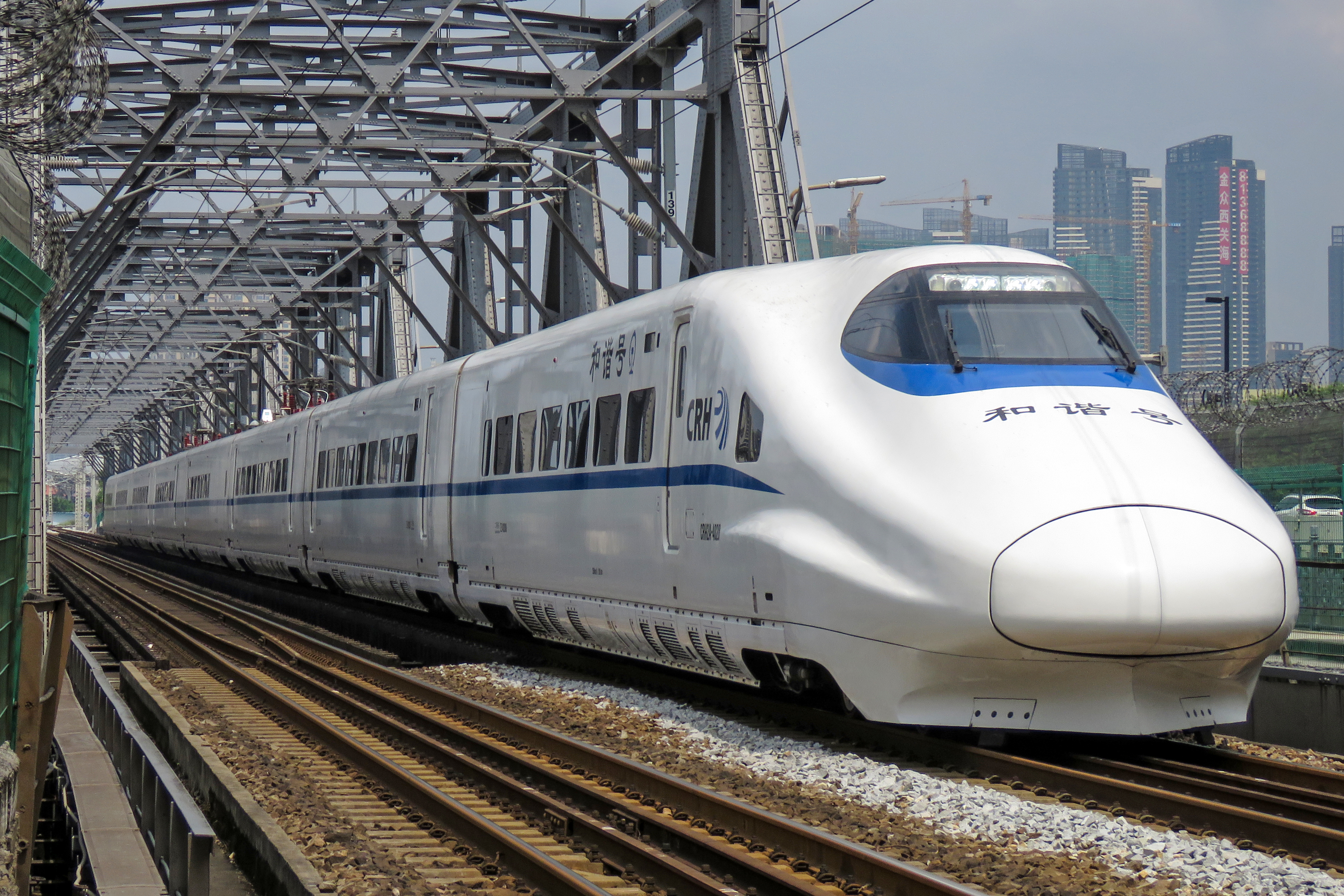
A CRH2A unit in September 2018

China ordered 60 trainsets based on the E2-1000 series design in 2004 for upgraded mainline services; the type was later designated CRH2A and became the second Shinkansen-derived train exported after the 700T for Taiwan. Under the contract, three sets were built in Japan, six were supplied in complete knock down (CKD) form for assembly by CSR Sifang Locomotive and Rolling Stock, and the remaining 51 were built by Sifang through technology transfer.

== Withdrawals ==
Withdrawals of E2 series sets commenced in October 2013, with the withdrawal of sets J2 and J3.

In March 2025, JR East announced development of the E10 series as the planned successor to the E2 and E5 series on the Tohoku Shinkansen, with pre-series vehicles scheduled for completion after autumn 2027 and commercial service targeted for fiscal 2030.

== Preserved examples ==
Car E223-23 of former set J10 was moved from Sendai Depot to Sanwa Tekki Corporation in Utsunomiya, Tochigi, in February 2017, where it is preserved.

Car E223-1101 of former set J51 is used as a training facility at the Shinkansen Education and Training Center, a training facility of JR East.

Car E224-127 of former set J14 was moved to the Hirosawa City theme park in Chikusei, Ibaraki, in November 2018, where it is preserved.

== See also ==
- List of high speed trains
