= China Railway CRH2 =

Chinese high-speed train type

China Railway CRH2 EMU
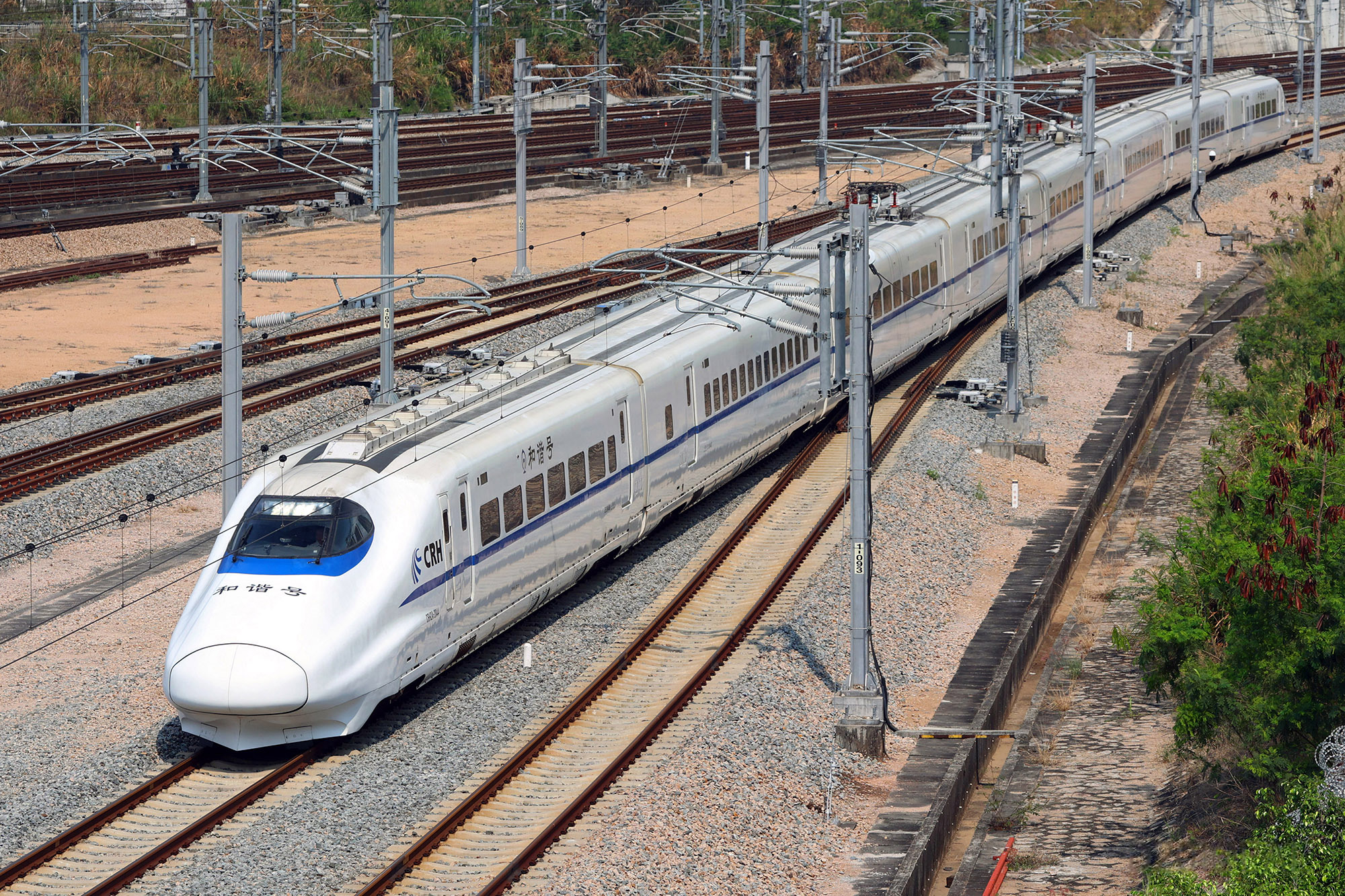
- CRH2A-2044
- In service: 2007–present
- Manufacturers: Kawasaki Heavy Industries, CRRC Qingdao Sifang
- Family name: Shinkansen (E2 series)
- Number built: CRH2A: 120+369+1 trainsets (3920 cars); CRH2B: 27 trainsets (432 cars); CRH2C (stage 1): 30 trainsets (240 cars); CRH2C (stage 2): 30 trainsets (240 cars); CRH2E: 20+5 trainsets (480 cars); CRH2G: 29 trainsets (232 cars)
- Number scrapped: 1 trainset (10 cars; derailment)
- Successor: CR300AF, CR300BF, CR400AF, CR400BF
- Formation: CRH2A: 8 cars per trainset (4M4T); CRH2B/E: 16 cars per trainset (8M8T); CRH2C: 8 cars per trainset (6M2T)
- Capacity: CRH2A: 610/571/562/588/600/608; CRH2B: 1230; CRH2C: 610/626; CRH2E: 630/880(CRH2E-2463, 2464 and 2465)
- Operators: China Railway: CR Beijing; CR Shanghai; CR Jinan; CR Xi'an; CR Wuhan; CR Nanchang; CR Zhengzhou; CR Taiyuan; CR Chengdu; CR Guangzhou; CR Nanning
- Lines served: Most 200–250 km/h (124–155 mph) high speed rail lines across China, plus some conventional lines

Specifications
- Train length: CRH2A/C: 201.4 m (660 ft 9 in); CRH2B/E: 401.4 m (1,316 ft 11 in)
- Width: 3,380 mm (11 ft 1 in)
- Height: 3,700 mm (12 ft 2 in)
- Platform height: 1,250 mm (4 ft 1 in)
- Maximum speed: CRH2A/B/E: 250 km/h (155 mph); CRH2C (stage 1): 300 km/h (186 mph); CRH2C (stage 2): 350 km/h (217 mph)
- Traction system: Water cooling IGBT–VVVF inverter control (CRH2B/E: Mitsubishi Electric type MAP-304-A25V141, CRH2A/C: Hitachi type CII-HHR1420A/B/D, Zhuzhou CSR Times Electric type TGA10/10A/10E/10G)
- Traction motors: 3-phase AC induction motors (CRH2B/E: Mitsubishi Electric type MB-5120-A, Zhuzhou CSR Times Electric type MT-205; CRH2A/C: Hitachi/CRRC Yongji Electric type YJ-92A, Zhuzhou CSR Times Electric type YQ-365)
- Power output: CRH2A: 4.8 MW (6,437 hp); CRH2B/E: 9.6 MW (12,874 hp); CRH2C: Stage 1: 7.2 MW (9,655 hp); Stage 2: 8.76 MW (11,747 hp)
- Transmission: AC-DC-AC
- Electric system: 25 kV 50 Hz AC Overhead catenary
- Current collection: Pantograph
- Braking systems: Regenerative, electronically controlled pneumatic brakes
- Track gauge: 1,435 mm (4 ft 8 1/2 in) standard gauge

The CRH2 Hexie (simplified Chinese: 和谐号; traditional Chinese: 和諧號; pinyin: Héxié Hào; lit. 'Harmony') is one of the high-speed train models in China. The CRH2 is based on the E2-1000 Series Shinkansen design from Japan with the license purchased from a consortium formed of Kawasaki Heavy Industries, Mitsubishi Electric, and Hitachi, and represents the second Shinkansen train model to be exported.

In 2004, the Ministry of Railway in China purchased an initial 60 sets of the train from Kawasaki Heavy Industries with a maximum speed of 250 km/h (155 mph). However, the newer versions of the CRH2 are not related to the E2-1000 Series despite having the same exterior shell.

== Variants ==
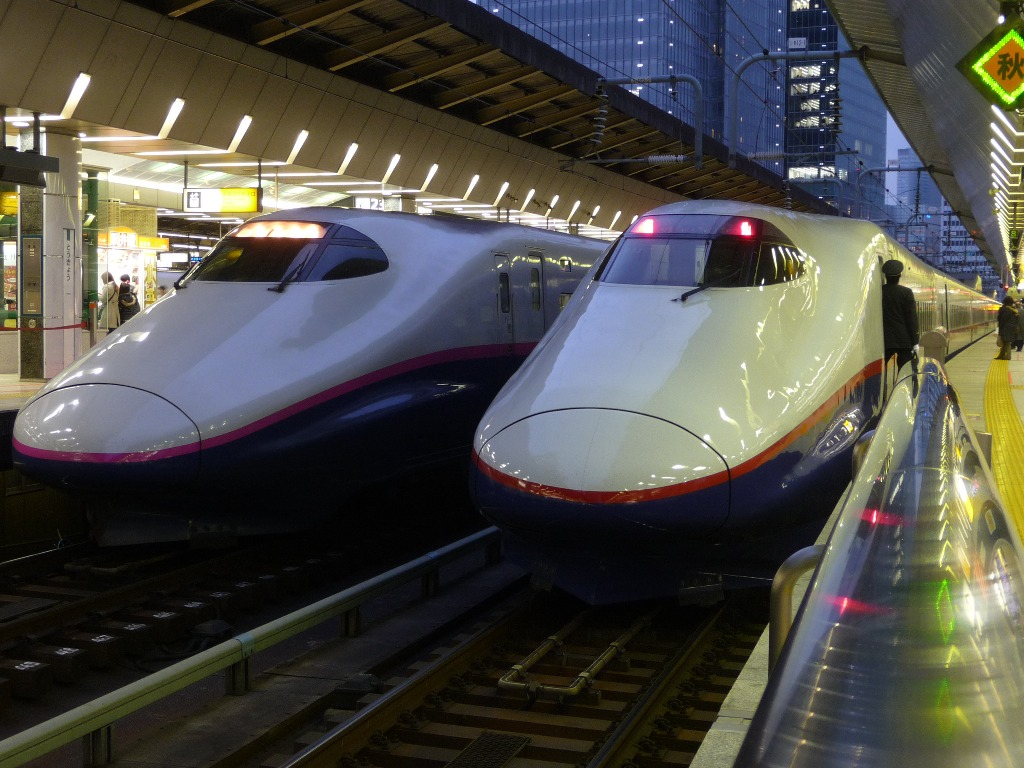
The CRH2 developed from the E2 Series Shinkansen

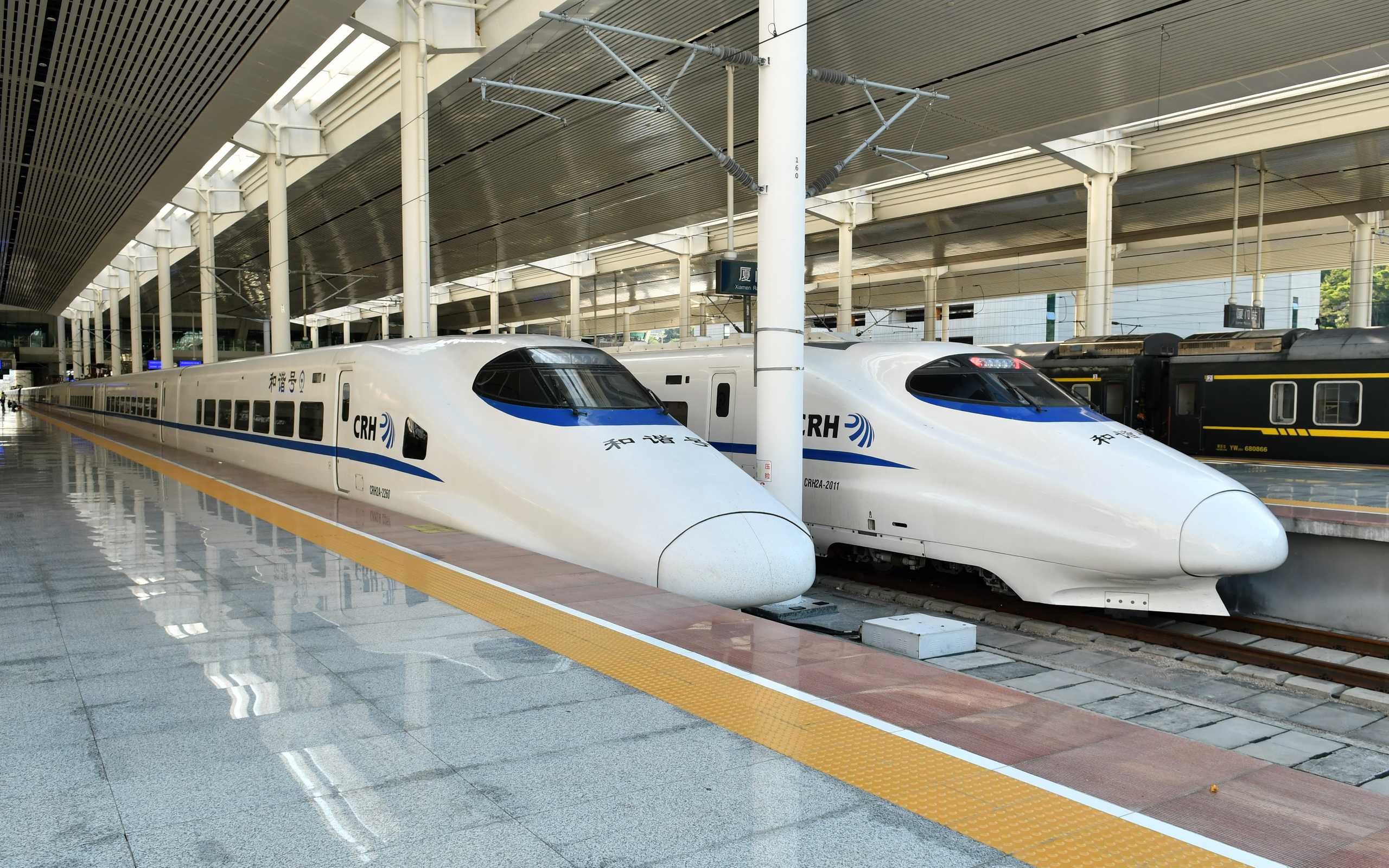
CRH2A-2260&2011 at Xiamen railway station

=== CRH2A ===
On October 20, 2004, the Ministry of Railway in China ordered 60 sets of CRH2A trains from Kawasaki Heavy Industries in Japan. Along with 60 sets of Bombardier's Regina-based CRH1A, and 40 sets of Alstom's Pendolino-based CRH5A, these train sets are consider as first batch of CRH trains.

Each of the CRH2A set consists of 8 cars. The first 3 sets (CRH_{2}-001A - CRH_{2}-003A) were built in Japan, the next 6 sets (CRH_{2}-004A - CRH_{2}-009A) were delivered in complete knock down form and assembled by CSR Sifang Locomotive and Rolling Stock. The remaining 51 sets (CRH_{2}-010A - CRH_{2}-060A) were built by Sifang through technology transfer from Japan.

The first train arrived at Qingdao port on March 8, 2006, with little fanfare, and was not even publicized in China. These trains have a maximum operation speed of 250 km/h (155 mph) and started providing high-speed train service from April 18, 2007, the date of the sixth national railway speed-up.

According to Chinese and Japanese media, CRH2A trains started test trials ahead of commercial operation on the Shanghai-Hangzhou and Shanghai-Nanjing lines on January 28, 2007.

On September 14, 2010, the Chinese MOR ordered additional 40 sets of CRH2A trains (CRH_{2}-151A - CRH_{2}-190A) from CSR Sifang.

Additionally, from 2012 to 2017, CRH_{2}A-2212 to CRH_{2}A-4131 were introduced.

==== CRH2A-4020 ====
Following a derailment in Guizhou in 2022, CRH_{2}A-4020 was converted to become the first dedicated High-Speed freight train of China. The two derailed carriages, 00 and 07, were scrapped, while new windowless carriages were rebuilt in place. The rest of the train was also modified in a similar manner, but the windows were retained. The modified train was revealed in March 2024, and entered testing the following month.

=== CRH2B ===
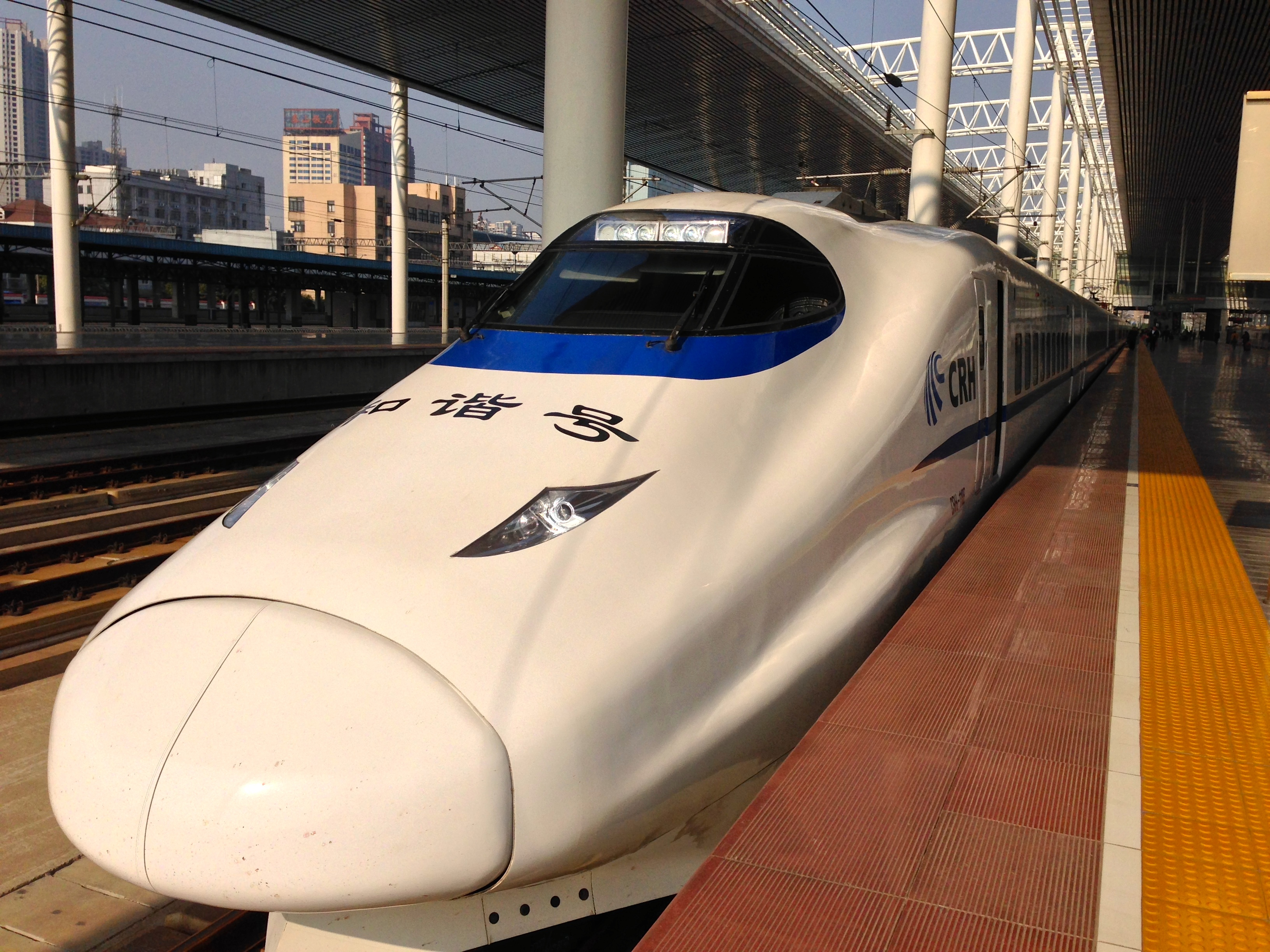
CRH2B at Wuxi Railway Station

In November 2007, the Ministry of Railway in China ordered 10 CRH2 sets with 16 cars per set (8M8T). These trains have been given designations CRH2B (CRH_{2}-111B - CRH_{2}-120B). Each CRH2B has three 1st seating cars (ZY), twelve 2nd seating cars (ZE), and one dining car (CA). Designed maximum operation speed is 250 km/h (155 mph) with a power of 9,600 kW (12,874 hp). These CRH2 have "Phoenix eyes" headlights who were not present on the CRH2A.

The first units were delivered on June 29, 2008, and came into service on the Hefei–Nanjing Passenger Railway on August 1, 2008.

=== CRH2C ===
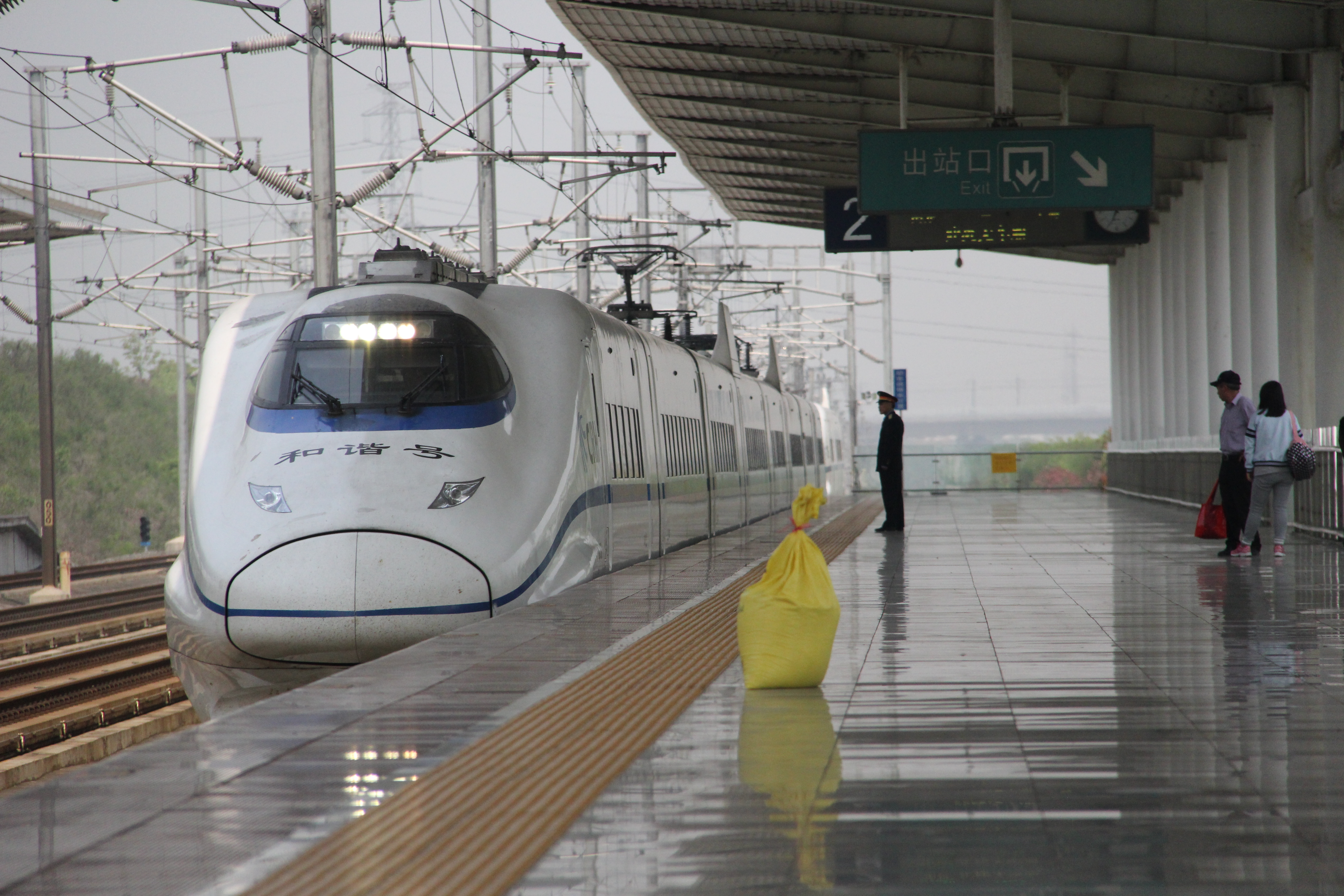
CRH2C

After the introduction of the modified E2-1000 Series, Sifang built its own CRH2 with a maximum safe operating speed of 300 km/h (186 mph). The original train sets imported from Kawasaki had a maximum safe operating speed of 250 km/h (160 mph).

During June 2005 and September 2005, The Chinese Ministry of Railways launched bidding for High speed trains with a top speed over 300 km/h (186 mph). Along with Siemens's Velaro-based CRH3C, CSR Sifang bid 60 sets of CRH2C, includes 30 sets of CRH2C stage one with a top speed of 300 km/h (186 mph), and 30 sets of CRH2C stage two with a top speed of 350 km/h (217 mph).

In development and research of the 350 km/h (217 mph) high speed train, The CRH2-300 project was launched by Chinese MOR and CSR. In 2006 the China Development Bank provided CNY 15 billion developmental financial loans to CSR Group for the projects of 200–300 km/h (124–186 mph) high speed trains. Over 50 academics, 150,000 technicians, 600 contractors were involved in the project. This train's livery is not like the CRH2A, which the blue stripe does not end at the fronts of trainsets.

==== CRH2C stage one ====
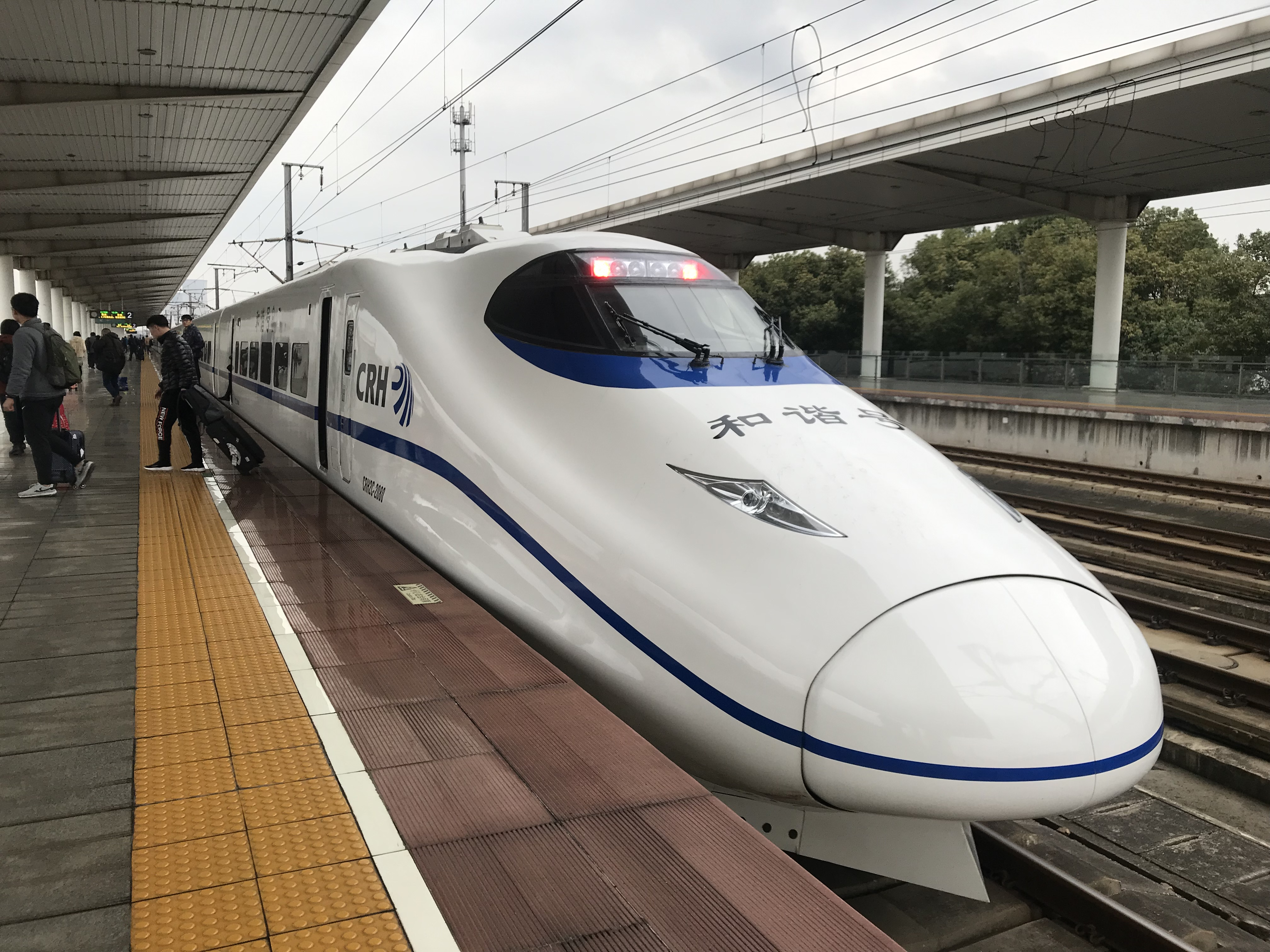
CRH2C-2080

CRH2C Stage one is a modified version of CRH2A. It has a maximum operating speed up to 300 km/h (186 mph) by replacing two intermediate trailer cars with motorized cars. Equipped with an array of the state-of-the-art technologies, including aluminum alloy body with a reduced weight, high speed turntable, high speed pantograph, and optic-fiber based integrated control system.

Chinese MOR ordered 30 sets of CRH2C stage one, name code CRH_{2}-061C - CRH_{2}-090C. The first set, CRH_{2}-061C was unveiled on December 22, 2007.

During the test on April 22, 2008, CRH_{2}-061C reached a top speed of over 370 km/h (230 mph) on Beijing-Tianjin high-speed rail.

During the test on December 11, 2009, CRH_{2}-061C reached a top speed of 394.2 km/h (244.9 mph) on Zhengzhou-Xi'an high-speed rail.

Together with CRH3C, the CRH2C stage one first came into service on Beijing-Tianjin Intercity high-speed rail on August 1, 2008, and all CRH2C stage one trains have been replaced by CRH3C in April, 2009. Currently, most of these trains are serving on the Shanghai-Nanjing high speed rail.

==== CRH2C stage two ====
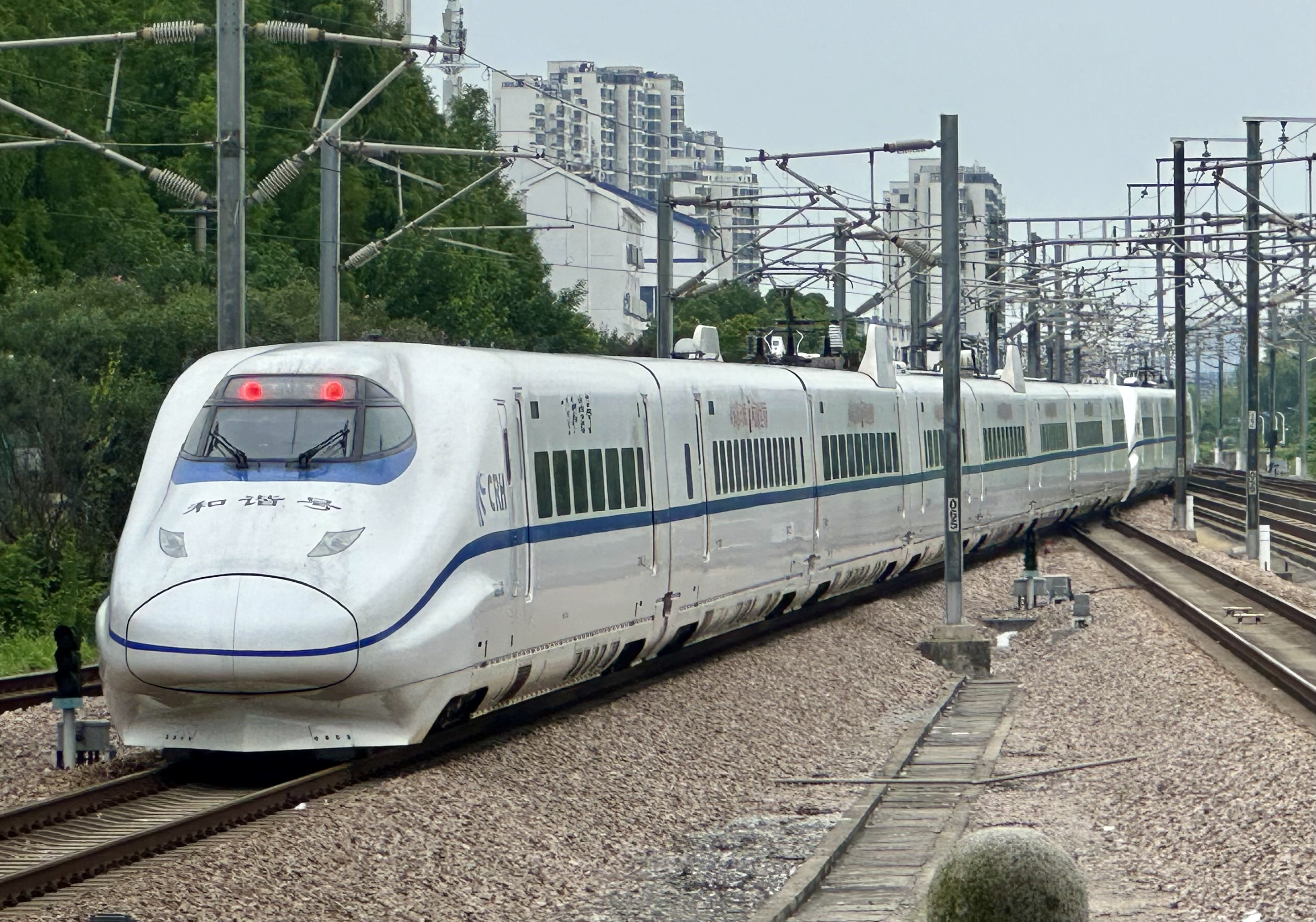
CRH2C-2103

CRH2C Stage two is the "re-design" version of the CRH2. Some of the details, like the aluminum body structure, noise reduction technology & reduction technique, draw on the CRH3C. And cancelled the driver's door. According to CSR Sifang, the improvements include the following aspects:

- The axle weight of the bogie increased from 14 to 15 tonnes (30,865 to 33,069 lb), to prevent tremble of the train body at a higher speed, the gear ratio has been optimized from 3.036 to 2.379, the critical instability speed is 550 km/h (340 mph).
- The thermal capacity of the bogie has been increased, which satisfied the continuous operation at 350 km/h (217 mph)
- With the YQ-365 type AC traction motor. It has a maximum operating speed up to 350 km/h (217 mph) with a power of 8,760 kW (11,747 hp).
- The rigidity of the car body has been increased to lower the noise and vibration.
- Optimized car body and window design for better air tightness and strength.
- Added pressure protection system to avoid pressure fluctuation in the compartment and improvement of comfort.
- Optimized design of the roof antenna, exterior windscreen and windows for a lower air resistance.

Chinese MOR ordered 30 sets of CRH2C stage two, name code CRH_{2}-091C - CRH_{2}-110C and CRH_{2}-141C - CRH_{2}-150C. The first set, CRH_{2}-091C was unveiled in January 2010 and came into service on Zhengzhou-Xi'an high-speed rail in February 2010. Currently, most of these trains are serving on the Shanghai-Nanjing high speed rail, too.

=== CRH2E ===
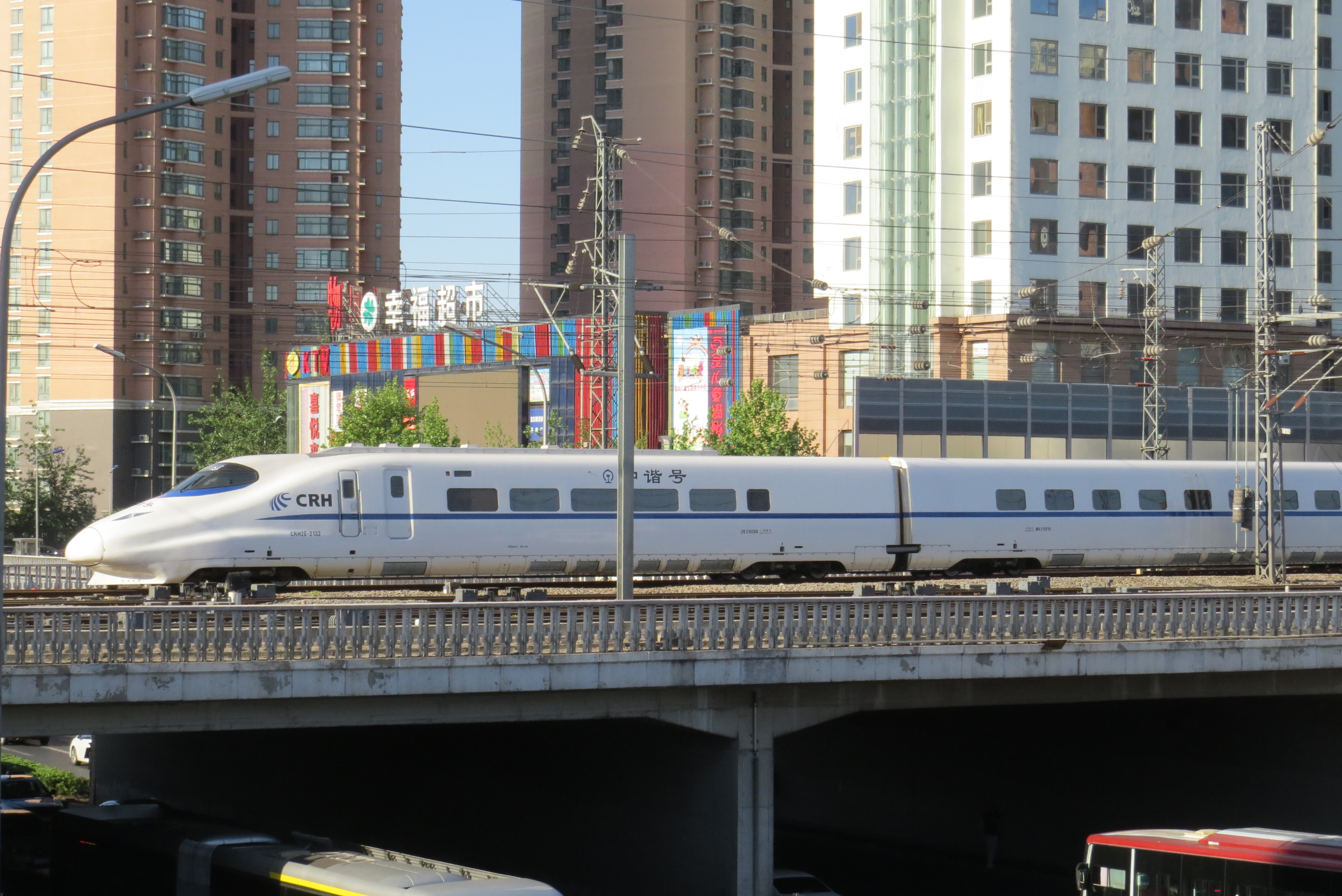
A CRH2E arriving Beijing West railway station as D924 Guangzhou-Beijing overnight train in 2015.

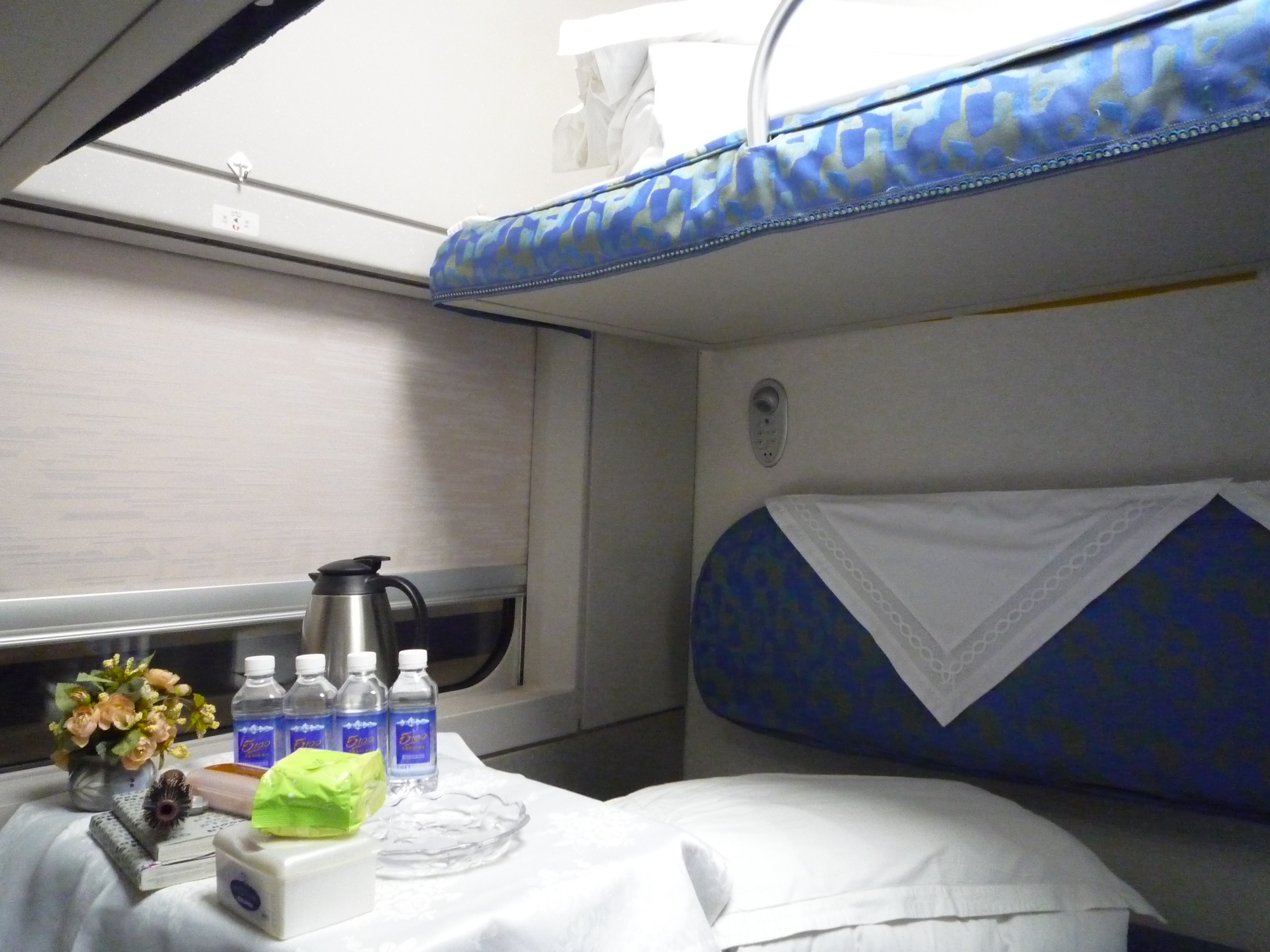
Inside a traditional berth style sleeper car of a CRH2E.

In November and December 2007, the Ministry of Railway in China ordered 20 CRH2 sleeper trains with 16 cars per set (8M8T). These trains are modified CRH2Bs, outfitted with traditional railway sleeping berths (couchette car) and have been given designations CRH2E (numbered CRH2-121E - CRH2-140E). Each CRH2E has thirteen 1st class sleeping cars (WR), two 2nd class seating cars (ZE), and one buffet car (CA) or one second class/dining car (ZEC). Designed maximum operation speed is 250 km/h (155 mph) with 9,600 kW (12,874 hp) of power output.

The first batch of CRH2E, CRH_{2}-121E - CRH_{2}-126E, came into service on Beijing-Shanghai railway on December 21, 2008. On 23 July 2011, one sleeper coach on CRH_{2}-139E trainset has been derailed in the 2011 Wenzhou train collision, together with CRH_{1}-046B.

The rest of CRH2Es were deployed on Beijing–Guangzhou–Shenzhen–Hong Kong High-Speed Railway since January 2015, operating overnight sleeper trains between Beijing and Guangzhou (including some trains to Shenzhen).

==== Double Deck CRH2E ====
A brand new variant of the CRH2E entered service in 2017 numbered beyond CRH2E-2463. Instead of a traditional railway sleeping berth the sleeper train is organized with the corridor running down the middle of the train car with double deck "capsules" on each side. Each capsule is similar in layout to airplane first class, and passengers are no longer sharing the room. Each capsule comes with independent tables, outlets, lamps, hangers and curtains. The body of the train is redesigned to reduce noise levels during travel. The trains have been dubbed "moving hotels".

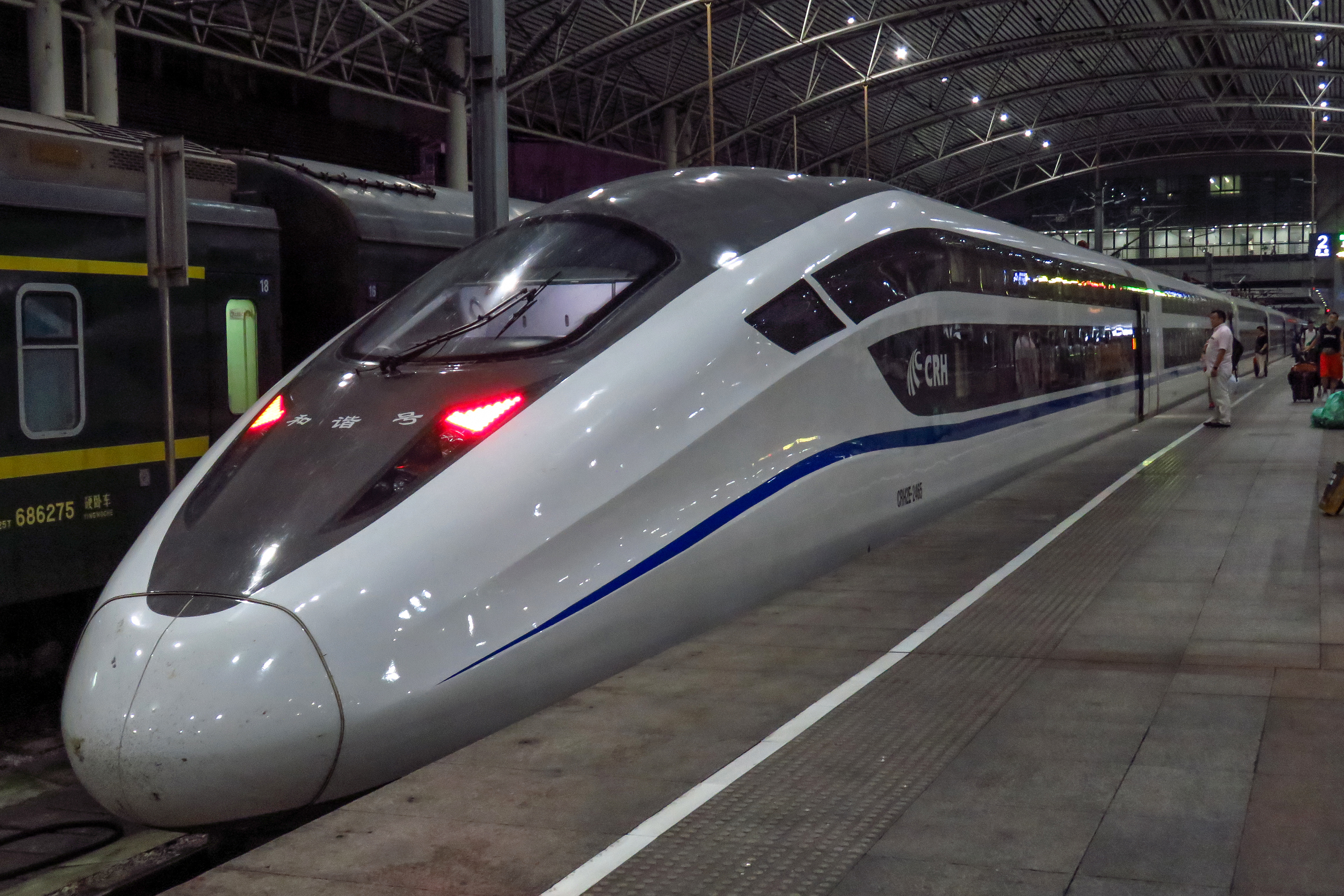
Front

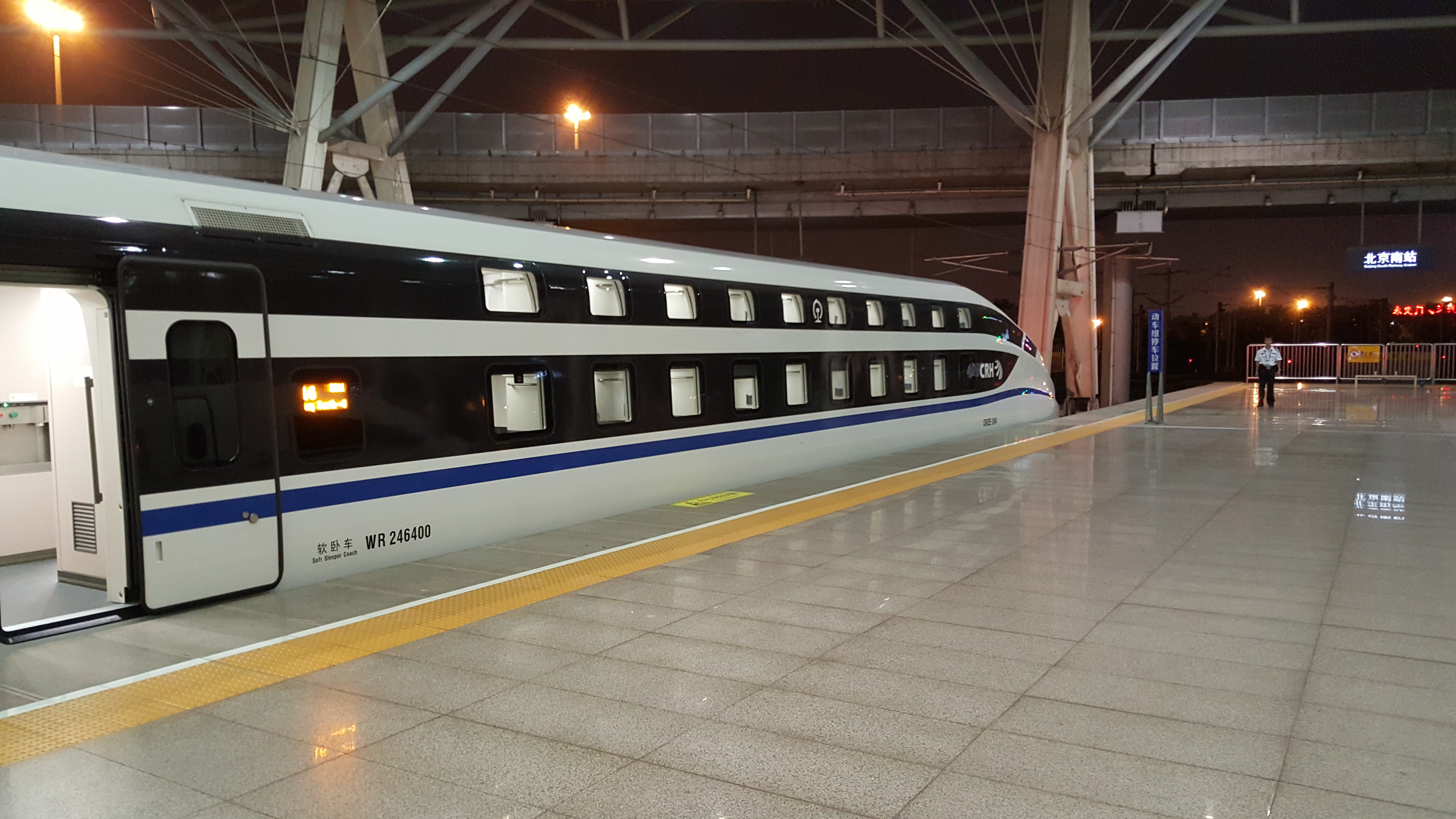
Exterior

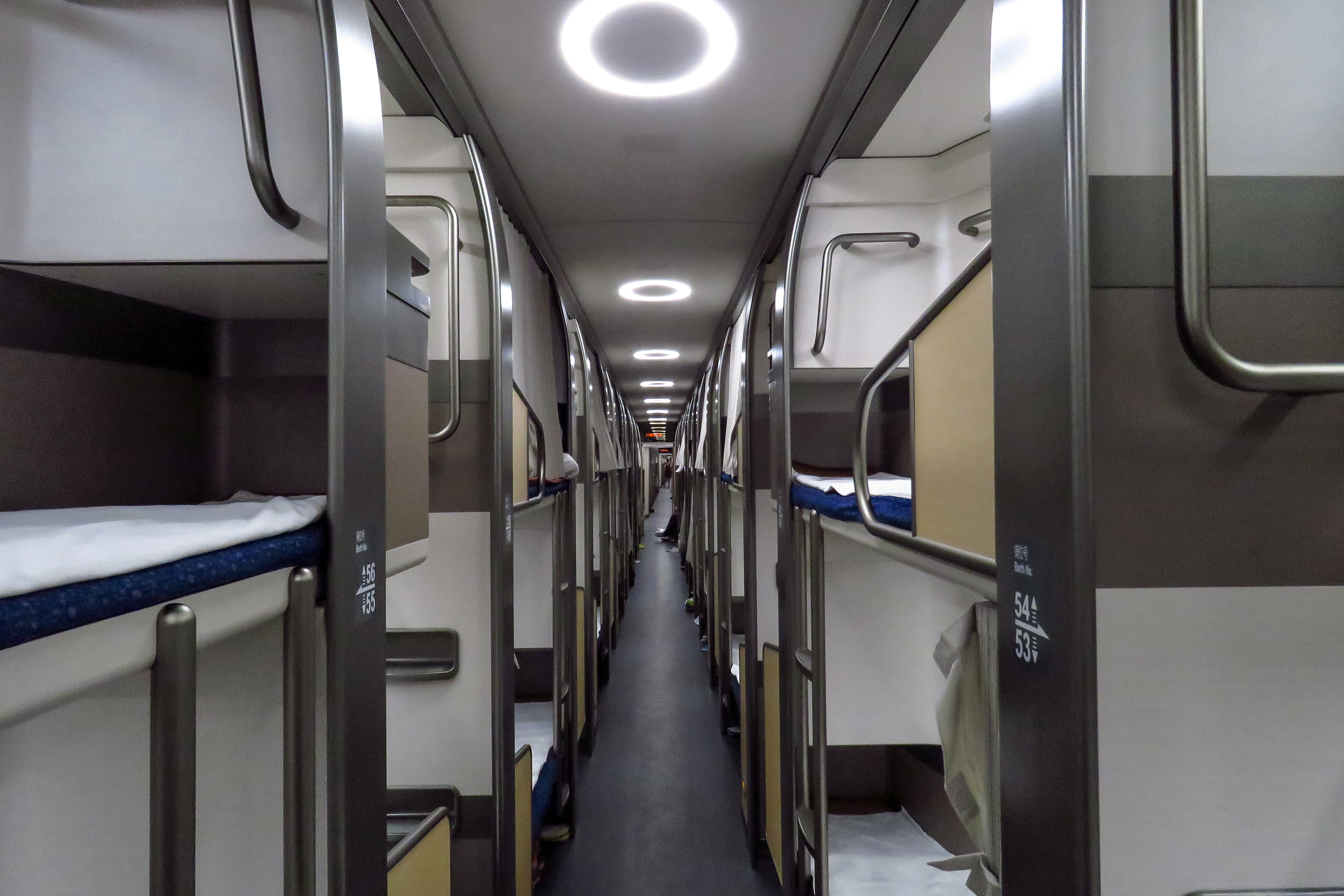
Interior

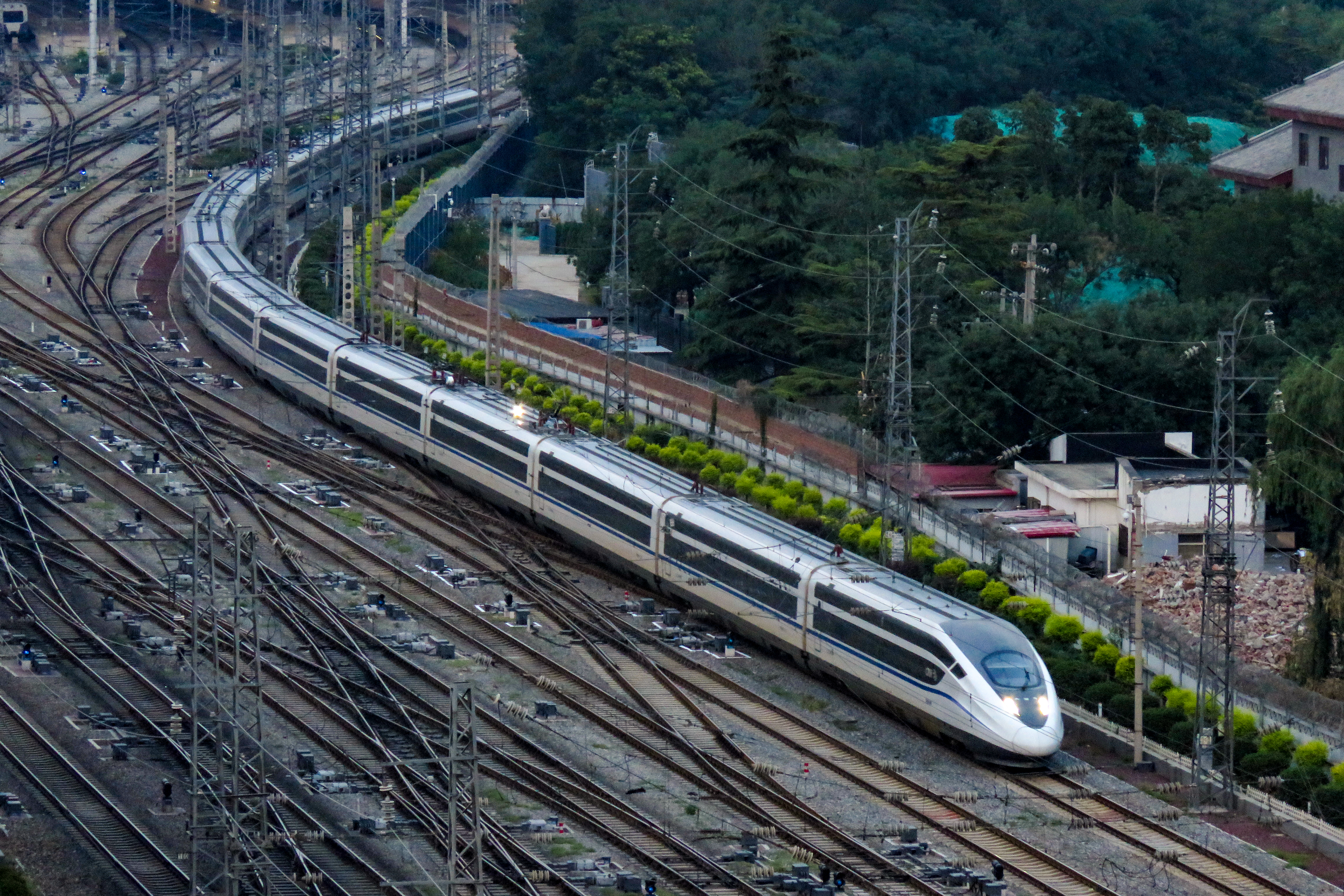
Leaving Beijing West railway station

=== CRH2G ===
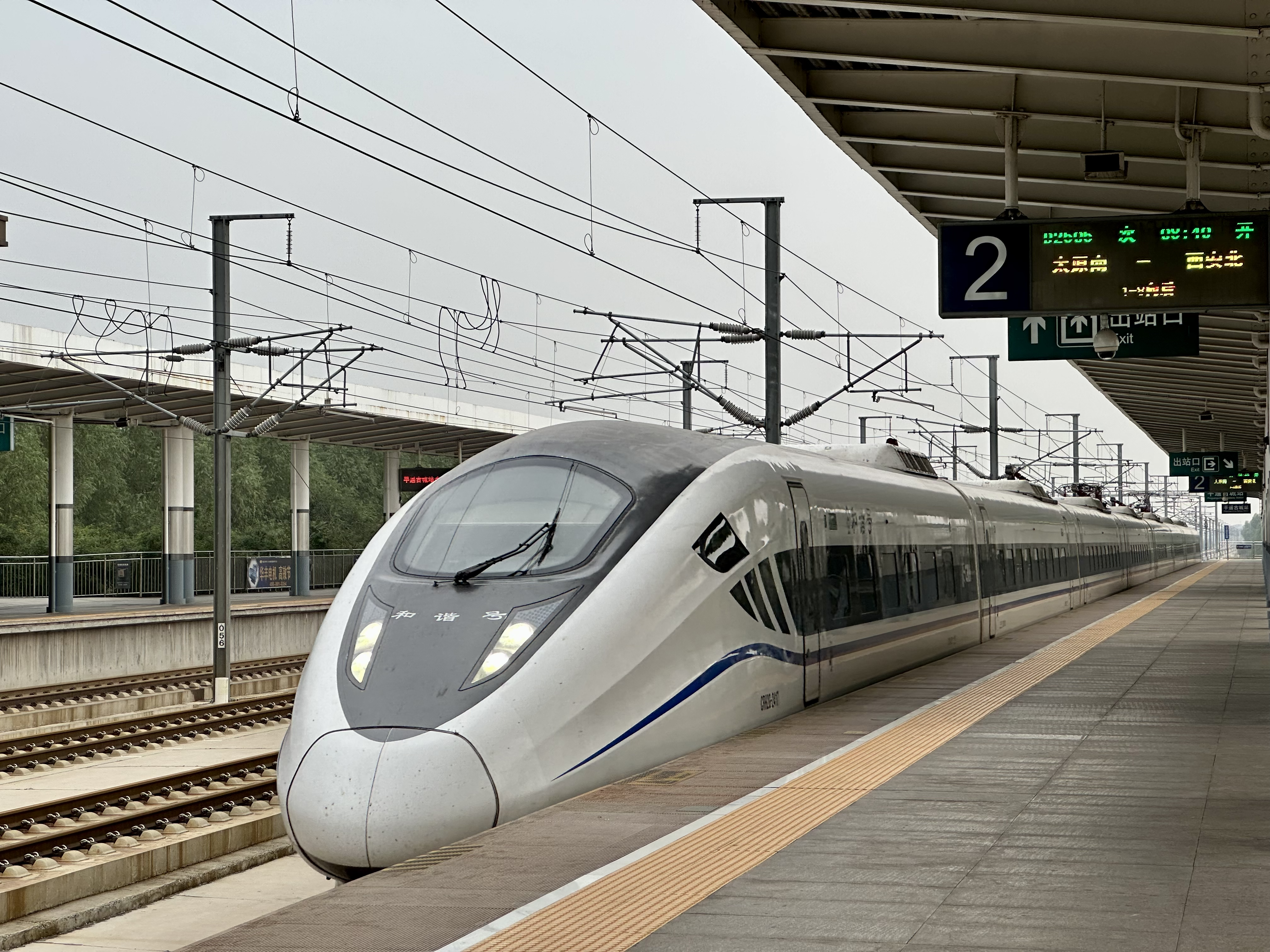
CRH2G-2417

CRH2G is a specialized cold and sand/windstorm resistant version of the CRH2 manufactured by CRRC Qingdao Sifang. The trains were tested on the Lanzhou–Xinjiang HSR and Harbin–Dalian HSR. Tests where completed on November 10, 2015, and the first sets were assigned to Lanzhou–Xinjiang HSR.

=== CRH2-380 (CRH2C-2150 experimental train) ===
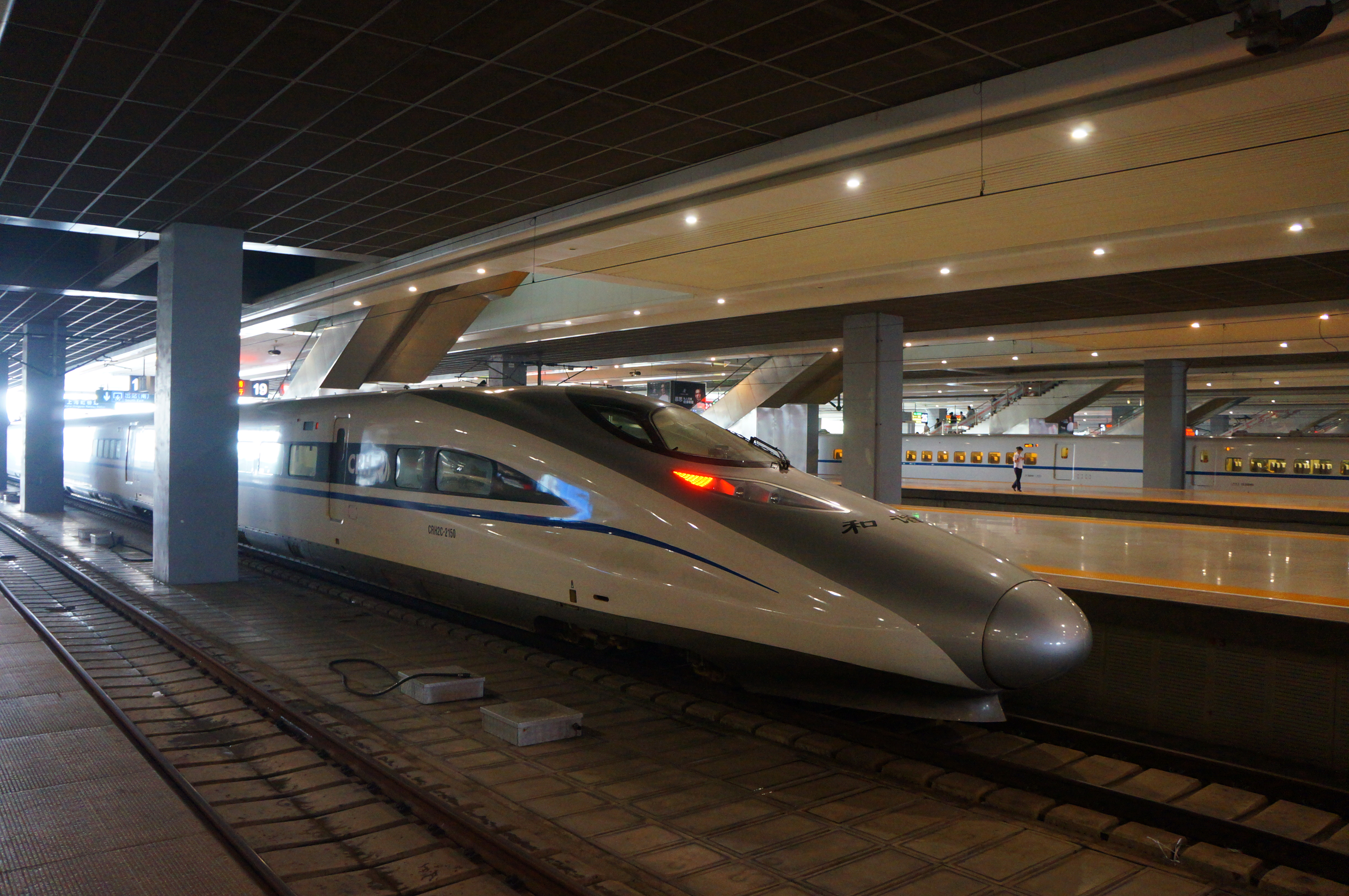
CRH2C-2150, an experimental testbed for CRH380A, at Shanghai Hongqiao Railway Station.

In 2008, the Chinese MOR & CSR launched CRH2-380 project, the main purpose is to develop new-generation of high speed trains with maximum operation speed of 380 km/h (236 mph). CRH2 is one of the fundamental platforms of the new trains, which is designated as CRH380A. The experimental train is a highly modified CRH2C number 2150. The main difference between this train and the regular CRH380A is the presence of two additional doors on the rear of the first and the last coach like on the CRH2C.

== Gallery ==
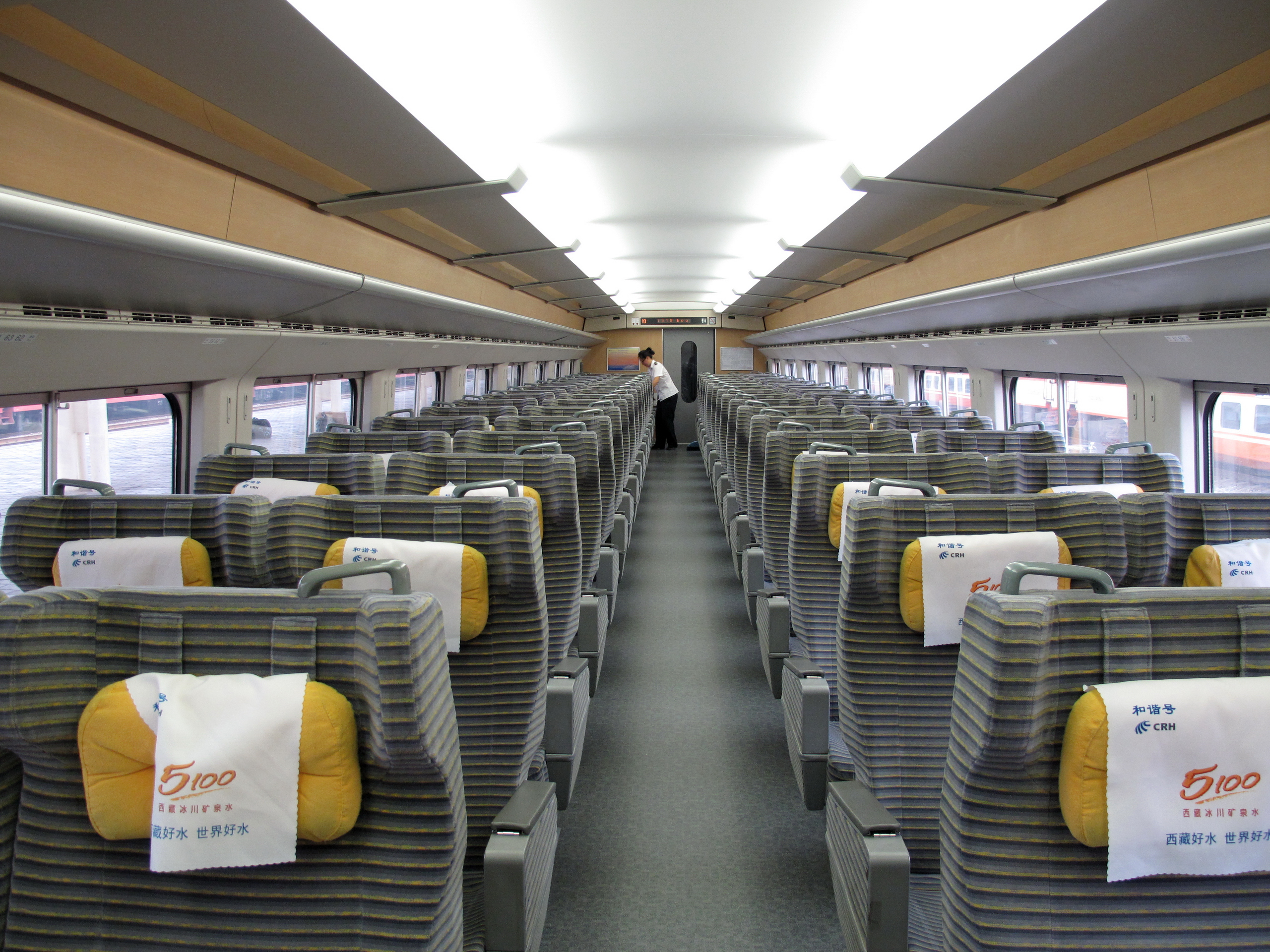
First Class Coach

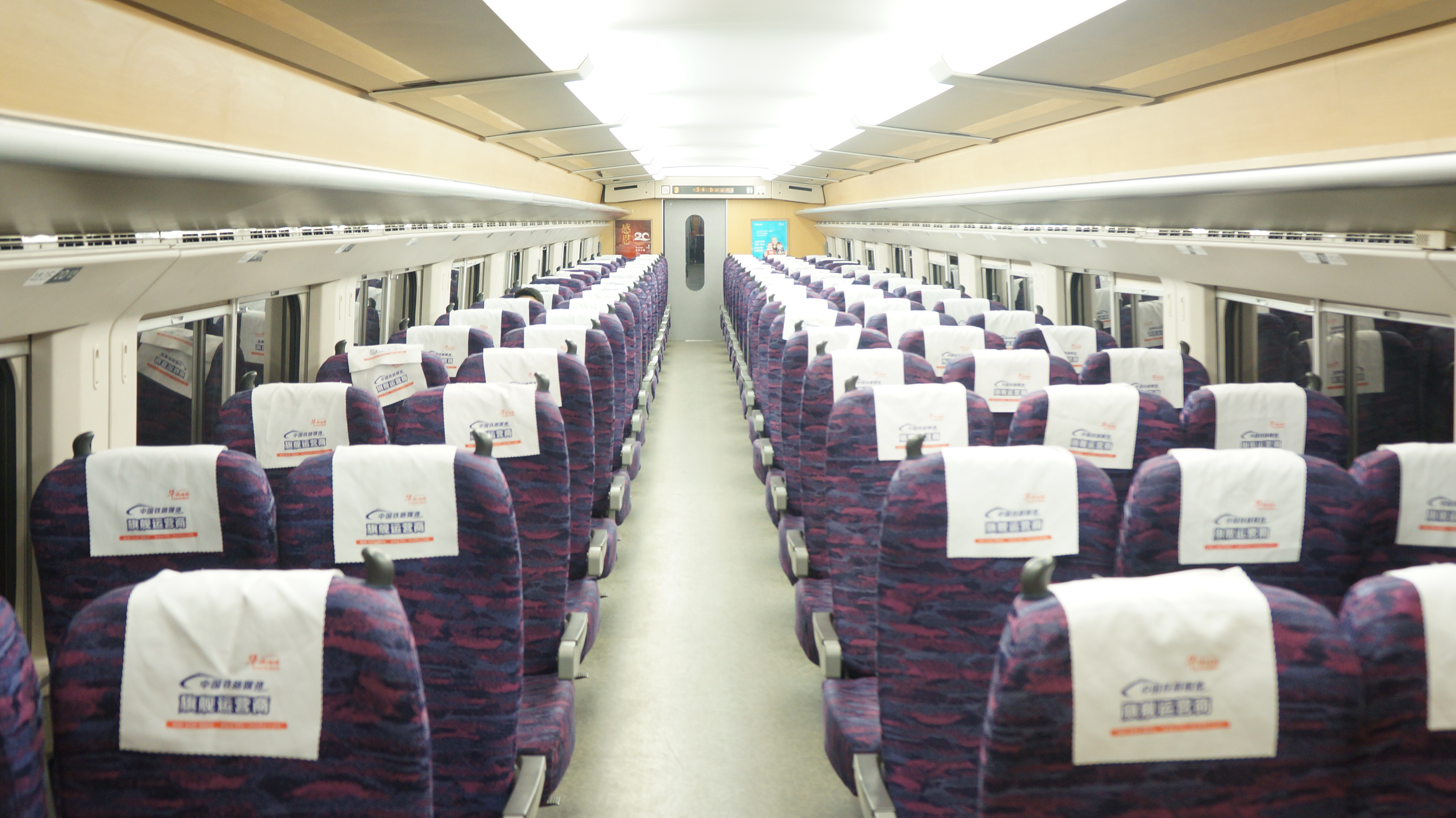
Second Class Coach

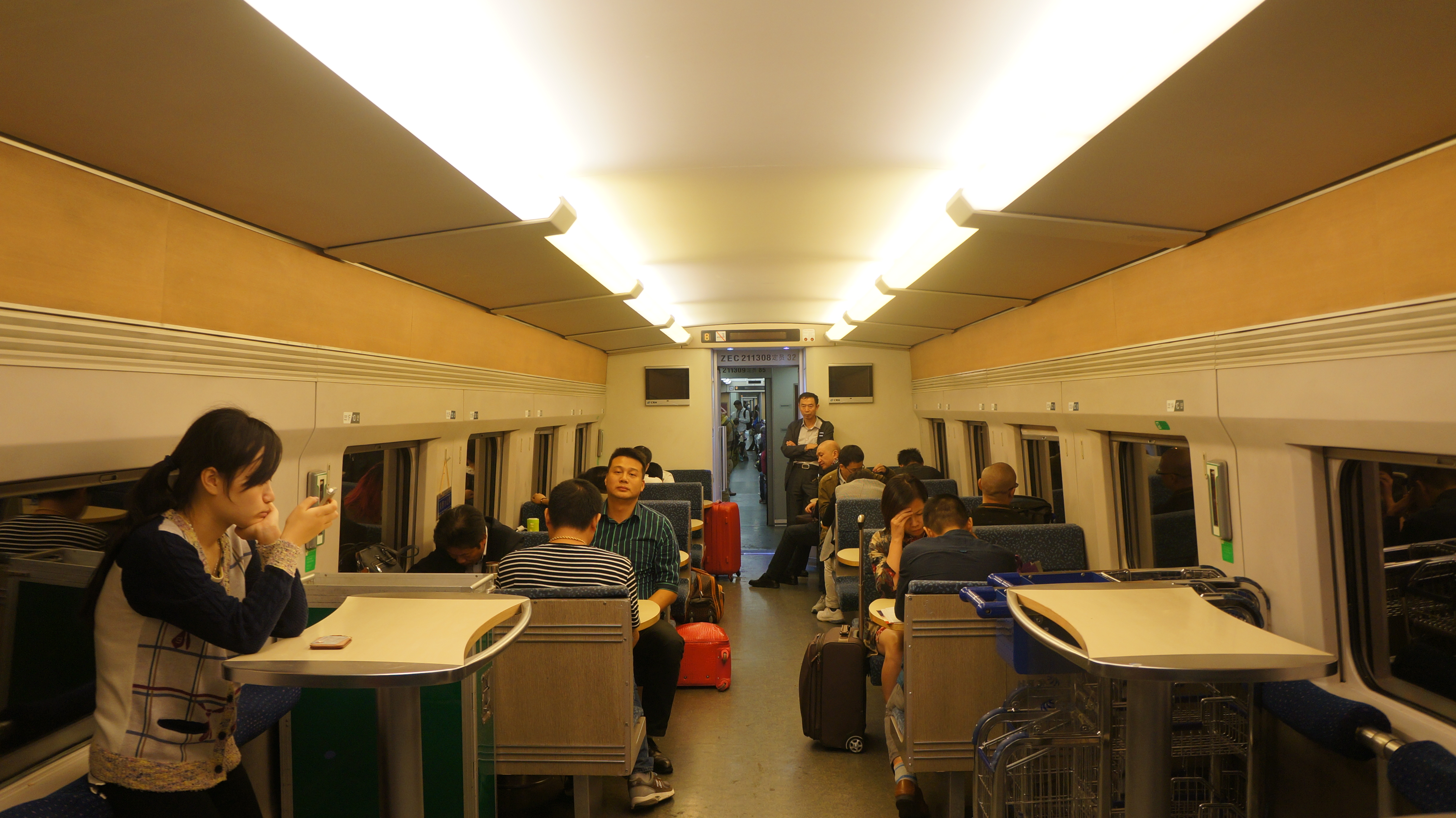
Buffet Car

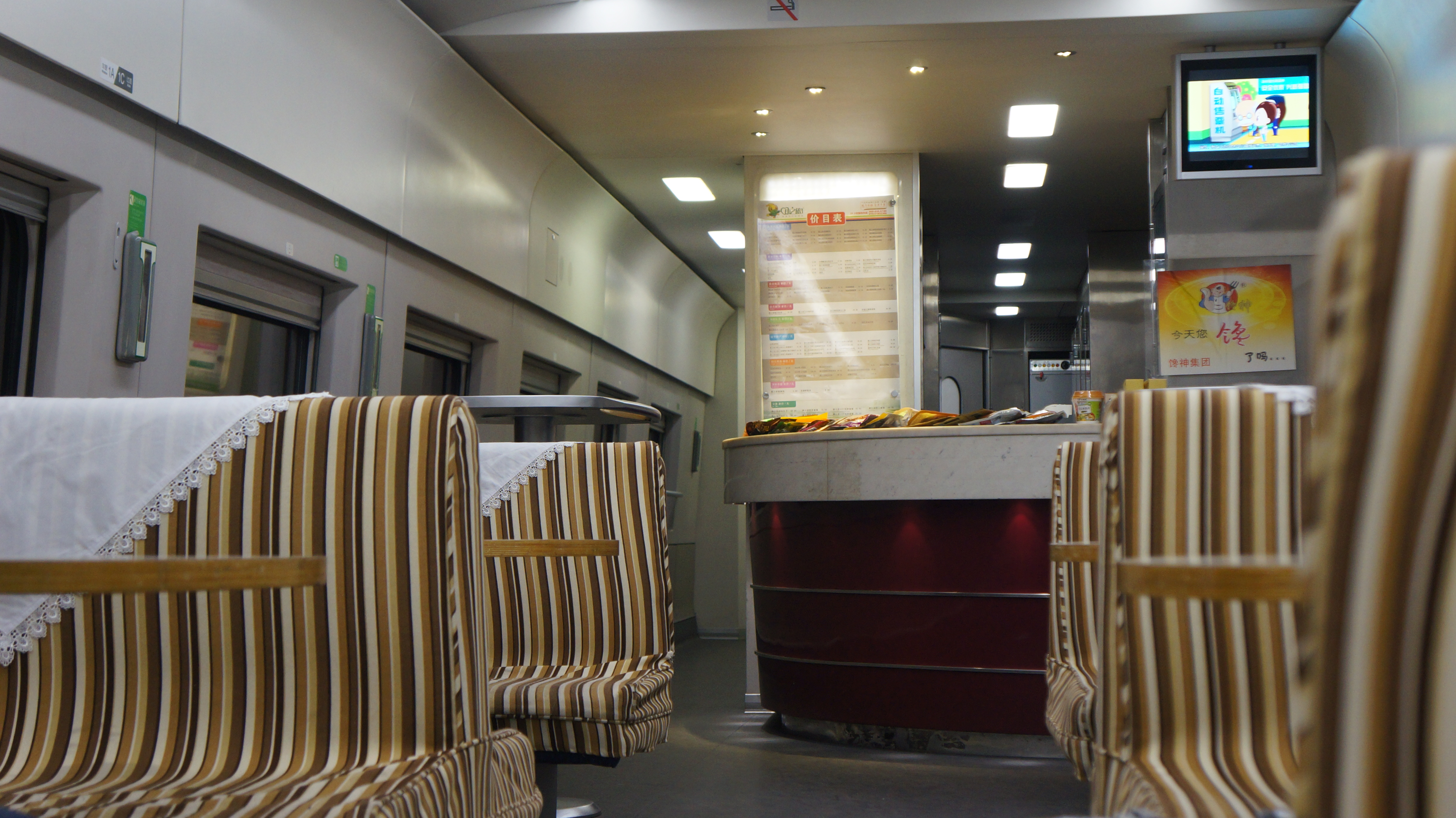
The buffet car of the CRH2E

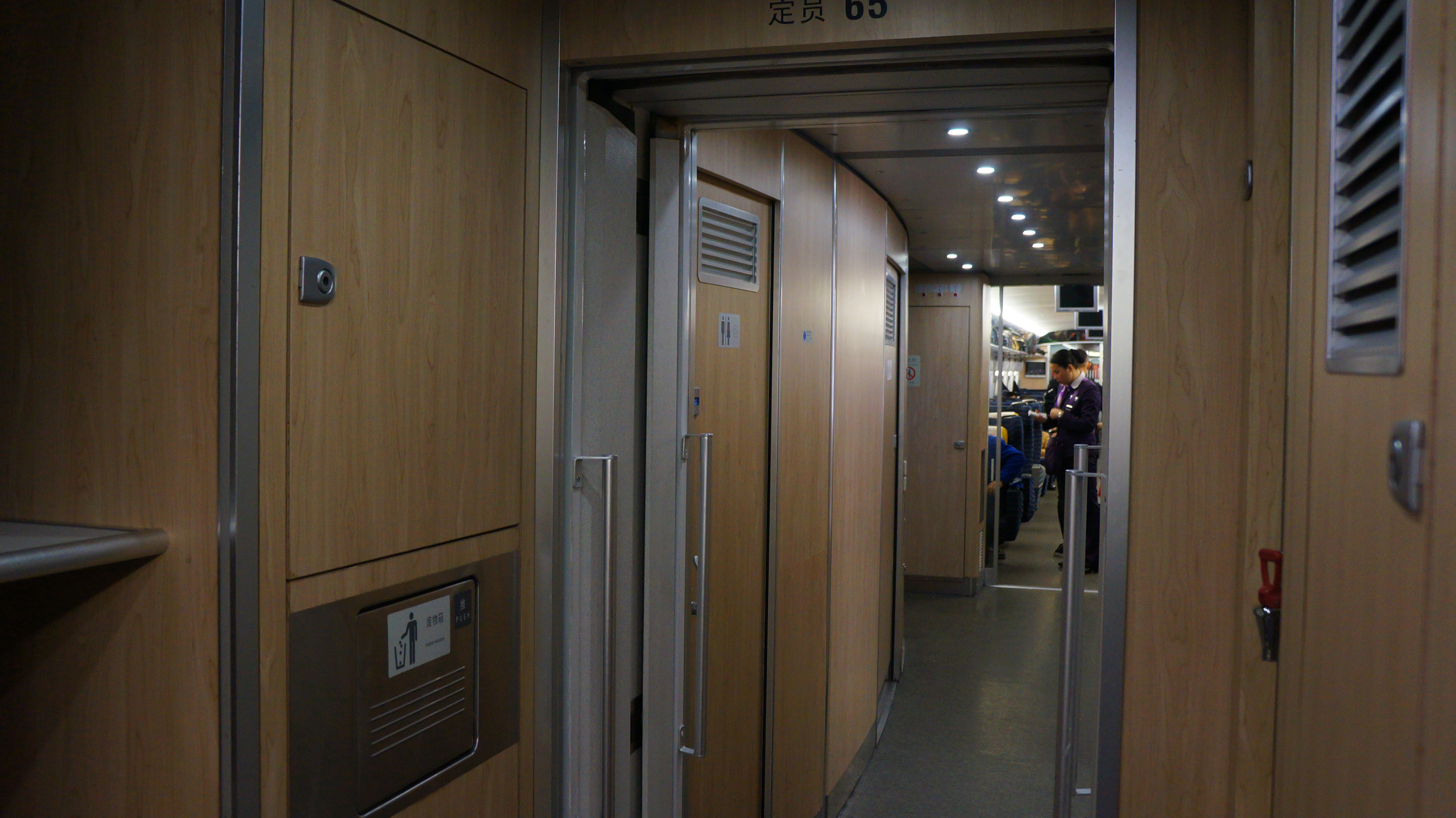
Compartment Connection

== Formation ==
At the time of the sixth national railway speed-up, at least 37 CRH2A sets had been delivered by Kawasaki and Sifang. In 2008, all 60 CRH2A sets had been delivered by Kawasaki. The post-2008 production model of the CRH2 are designed and made solely by Sifang with a maximum safe operation speed of 350 km/h (217 mph).

Power Destination

- M – Motor car
- T – Trailer car
- C – Driver cabin
- P – Pantograph

Coach Type

- ZY – First Class Coach
- ZE – Second Class Coach
- CA – Dining Car
- ZEC – Second Class Coach/Buffet Car
- WR – Soft Sleeper Car
- WRC – Soft Sleeper Car/Dining Coach

=== CRH2A (Previous) ===
Coach No.	1	2	3	4	5	6	7	8
Type^{1}	ZE				ZEC	ZE	ZY	ZE
Type^{2}	ZE		ZY	ZE	ZEC	ZE	ZY	ZE
Type^{3}	ZE		ZET	ZE	ZEC	ZE	ZY	ZE
Type^{4}	ZYS		ZE	ZE	ZEC	ZE	ZYT	
Type^{5}	ZY		ZE		ZEC	ZE	ZY	
Type^{6}	ZE				ZEC	ZY		ZE
Type^{7}	ZE		ZYE	ZE	ZEC	ZE	ZY	ZE
Type^{8}	ZY	ZE			ZEC	ZE		
Power Configuration	TC	M		TP	T	MP	M	TC
Power Units	Unit 1				Unit 2			
Capacity^{1}	55	100	85	100	55 (+16)	100	51	64
Capacity^{2}	55	100	46	100	55 (+16)	100	51	64
Capacity^{3}	55	100	43+16	100	55 (+16)	100	51	64
Capacity^{4}	15+4	51+4	85	100	55 (+16)	100	24+4	
Capacity^{5}	42	78	85	100	55 (+16)	100	51	
Capacity^{6}	55	100	85	100	55 (+16)	78	51	64
Capacity^{7}	55	100	16+43	100	71	100	51	64
Capacity^{8}	48	90	90	77	63	90	90	65

- ^1 Other train sets
- ^2 Set Nº. 2006, 2011 and 2021
- ^3 Set Nº. 2015, 2027 and 2030
- ^4 Set Nº. 2042
- ^5 Set Nº. 2043
- ^6 Set Nº. 2044–2060
- ^7 Set Nº. 2151–2211. Coach No. 3 has 16 First Class Seats and 43 Second Class seats
- ^8 Set Nº. 2212–2416, 2427–2460, 2473–2499, 2828, 4001–4071, 4082–4095 and 4114–4131

=== CRH2A (Renovated) ===
Coach No.	1	2	3	4	5	6	7	8
Type^{1}	ZE				ZEC	ZE	ZY	ZE
Type^{2} (EC)	ZY	ZE			ZEC	ZE		
Power Configuration	TC	M		MP	M	MP	M	TC
Power Units	Unit 1				Unit 2			
Capacity^{1}	55	100	85	100	55 (+16)	100	51	64
Capacity^{2} (EC)	48	90	90	77	63	90	90	65

- ^1 Set Nº. 2001–2009, 2011–2060 and 2151–2211
- ^2 Set Nº. 2212–2416, 2427–2460, 2473–2499, 2828, 4001–4071, 4082–4095 and 4114–4131

=== CRH2B ===
Coach No.	1	2	3	4	5	6	7	8	9	10	11	12	13	14	15	16
Type	ZY			ZE				CA	ZE							
Power Configuration	TC	M		TP	T	M		T		M		T	TP	M		TC
Power Units	Unit 1				Unit 2				Unit 3				Unit 4			
Capacity	36	68	51	100	85	100	85	(32)	85	100	85	100	85	100	85	65

- Set Nº. 2111–2120, 2466–2472 and 4096–4105

=== CRH2C ===
Coach No.	1	2	3	4	5	6	7	8
Type	ZE				ZEC	ZE	ZY	ZE
Power Configuration	TC	M		MP	M	MP	M	TC
Power Units	Unit 1				Unit 2			
Capacity^{1}	55	100	85	100	55+16	100	51	64
Capacity^{2}	55	100	85	100	54+16	100	51	65

- ^1 Set Nº. 2062–2067 and 2069–2090
- ^2 Set Nº. 2091–2110 and 2141–2149

=== CRH2E ===
Coach No.	1	2	3	4	5	6	7	8	9	10	11	12	13	14	15	16
Type^{1}	ZE	WR						CA	WR							ZE
Type^{2}	ZE	WR							WRC	WR						ZE
Type^{3}	WR								WRC	WR						
Power Configuration	TC	M		TP	T	M		T		M		T	TP	M		TC
Power Units	Unit 1				Unit 2				Unit 3				Unit 4			
Capacity^{1}	55	40						(0)	40	40						55
Capacity^{2}	55	40							20	40						55
Capacity^{3}	40	60							20	60						40

- ^1 Set Nº. 2121–2138 and 2140
- ^2 Set Nº. 2461 and 2462
- ^3 Set Nº. 2463–2465

=== CRH2G ===
Coach No.	1	2	3	4	5	6	7	8
Type	ZY	ZE			ZEC	ZE		
Power Configuration	TC	M		MP	M	MP	M	TC
Power Units	Unit 1				Unit 2			
Capacity	48	90		77	63	90		65

- Set Nº. 2417–2426, 4072–4081 and 4106–4113

== Accidents ==
On July 23, 2011, two bullet trains were traveling in the same direction and the train in front, the CRH 1-046B was stopped by a or a faulty signal hit by lightning. The light that the second train was supposed to stop at was hit by lightning, malfunctioned and showed a green signal while it was supposed to be red. The second train was a CRH 2-139E. The CRH2 front cars fell off the viaduct and one standing at a 90° angle between the viaduct and the ground. The cars that fell to the ground are cars 1-3 and the fourth one was the one standing.

On June 6, 2022, D2809, operated by CRH2A-4020, was impacted by a mudslide just outside of Rongjiang Railway Station in Guizhou. The train derailed, and the driver was killed in the accident. All passengers survived.

== Distribution ==
As of April 2024:

Operator	Quantity	Serial number	Depot	Notes
CRH2A
CR Wuhan	33	2011, 2013, 2022, 2029, 2033, 2035, 2039, 2043, 2046, 2050-2052, 2054-2055, 2059-2060, 2152, 2162-2164, 2173, 2179, 2192-2193, 2200-2201, 2205-2211	Hankou	
CR Wuhan	15	2017, 2019, 2023, 2027, 2034, 2045, 2047-2049, 2053, 2056, 2151, 2169, 2180, 2199	Wuhan	
CR Shanghai	28	2001-2003, 2005, 2007, 2016, 2018, 2020, 2028, 2031, 2057-2058, 2161, 2166, 2168, 2174-2176, 2181-2184, 2187, 2189, 2194-2196, 2203	Shanghai South	
CR Shanghai	44	2004, 2006, 2008-2009, 2012, 2014-2015, 2021, 2024-2026, 2030, 2032, 2036-2038, 2040-2042, 2044, 2153-2160, 2165, 2167, 2170-2172, 2177-2178, 2185-2186, 2188, 2190-2191, 2197-2198, 2202, 2204	Nantong	
CR Nanchang	19	2215-2218, 2233, 2236-2237, 2246, 2249-2250, 2252, 2257, 2260-2261, 2284-2285, 2290, 2429-2430	Nanchang	
CR Nanchang	20	2212-2214, 2220-2224, 2247-2248, 2251, 2253-2256, 2259, 2291-2293, 2302	Nanchang West	
CR Nanchang	18	2219, 2235, 2282-2283, 2324, 2427, 2447, 2452, 2457-2458, 4006, 4012-4013, 4045, 4047-4050	Xiamen North	
CR Nanchang	7	2234, 2258, 2451, 2453-2454, 4008, 4046	Fuzhou South	
CR Nanchang	22	2271, 2275, 2326, 2434-2437, 2440-2442, 2446, 2455-2456, 2476-2477, 2493-2494, 4009, 4014-4017	Longyan	
CR Chengdu	25	2230, 2305, 2321, 2323, 2335-2336, 2338-2340, 2385, 2390, 2438, 2480-2482, 2490-2491, 4007, 4022, 4035-4040	Chongqing North	
CR Chengdu	8	2228, 2231, 2304, 2325, 2373, 2492, 4023, 4042	Chongqing West	
CR Chengdu	13	2272, 2333, 2337, 2360, 2363-2364, 2374, 2391-2392, 2395-2397, 4020	Guiyang North	
CR Nanning	55	2238, 2240-2245, 2262-2263, 2269-2270, 2276, 2279, 2281, 2286-2287, 2296-2297, 2301, 2303, 2312-2314, 2327-2328, 2346-2348, 2370-2371, 2375, 2377-2378, 2383, 2386-2387, 2393-2394, 2398-2399, 2401, 2404, 2407, 2443-2445, 2450, 4018, 4027, 4031-4032, 4069, 4071, 4114-4115	Nanning	
CR Nanning	35	2239, 2266, 2277-2278, 2280, 2288-2289, 2300, 2306-2307, 2366-2369, 2376, 2384, 2400, 2402, 2412-2413, 2431-2433, 2439, 4034, 4041, 4043, 4068, 4070, 4116-4121	Guilin North	
CR Taiyuan	20	2294-2295, 2308-2311, 2316-2319, 4122-4131	Taiyuan	
CR Guangzhou	21	2274, 2298, 2320, 2330-2331, 2341, 2349-2350, 2380-2381, 2389, 2403, 2405, 2416, 2474, 2488, 4002, 4004, 4025, 4056, 4067	Guangzhou South	
CR Guangzhou	26	2299, 2329, 2343-2344, 2372, 2379, 2382, 2388, 2408-2409, 2428, 2448, 2473, 2475, 2478-2479, 2487, 2495, 2497, 4003, 4024, 4060, 4062-4064, 4066	Foshan West	
CR Guangzhou	6	2449, 2496, 2498, 4055, 4061, 4065	Changsha	
CR Jinan	22	2225-2227, 2267-2268, 2332, 2334, 2361-2362, 2365, 2410-2411, 2414-2415, 2459, 2483, 2485-2486, 4010-4011, 4051-4052	Qingdao	
CR Jinan	10	2345, 2352-2359, 2484	Jinan	
CR Kunming	43	2229, 2232, 2264-2265, 2273, 2315, 2322, 2342, 2351, 2406, 2460, 2489, 2499, 2828, 4001, 4005, 4019, 4021, 4026, 4028-4030, 4033, 4044, 4053-4054, 4057-4059, 4082-4095	Kunming South	
China Railway	1	2010	—N/a	200~250 km/h comprehensive inspection train
CRH2B
CR Shanghai	10	2111-2120	Nanjing	
CR Wuhan	17	2466-2472, 4096-4105	Hankou	
CRH2C
CR Shanghai	57	2062-2067, 2069-2110, 2141-2149	Nanjing	
China Railway	3	2061, 2068, 2150	—N/a	Track Inspection Train
CRH2E
CR Beijing	17	2122-2126, 2128, 2130-2135, 2137-2138, 2463-2465	Beijing	
CR Guangzhou	7	2121, 2127, 2129, 2136, 2140, 2461-2462	Shenzhen	
China Railway	1	2139	Retired	CRH2E-2139 was severely damaged after Wenzhou train collision on 23 July 2011. Carriages 1 to 5 scrapped after derailment, Carriages 6 to 10 dismantled by MOR, and Carriages 11 to 16 transformed into inspection trains.
CRH2J
China Railway	1	0205	—N/a	Comprehensive inspection trains in orange livery

== See also ==
- China Railway CRH6
- China Railway CRH380A
- China Railway CIT trains
- E2 Series Shinkansen
- List of high-speed trains
- THSR 700T
