= Gala-Yuzawa Line =

Japanese railway branch line

Coordinates: 36°57′02″N 138°47′58″E

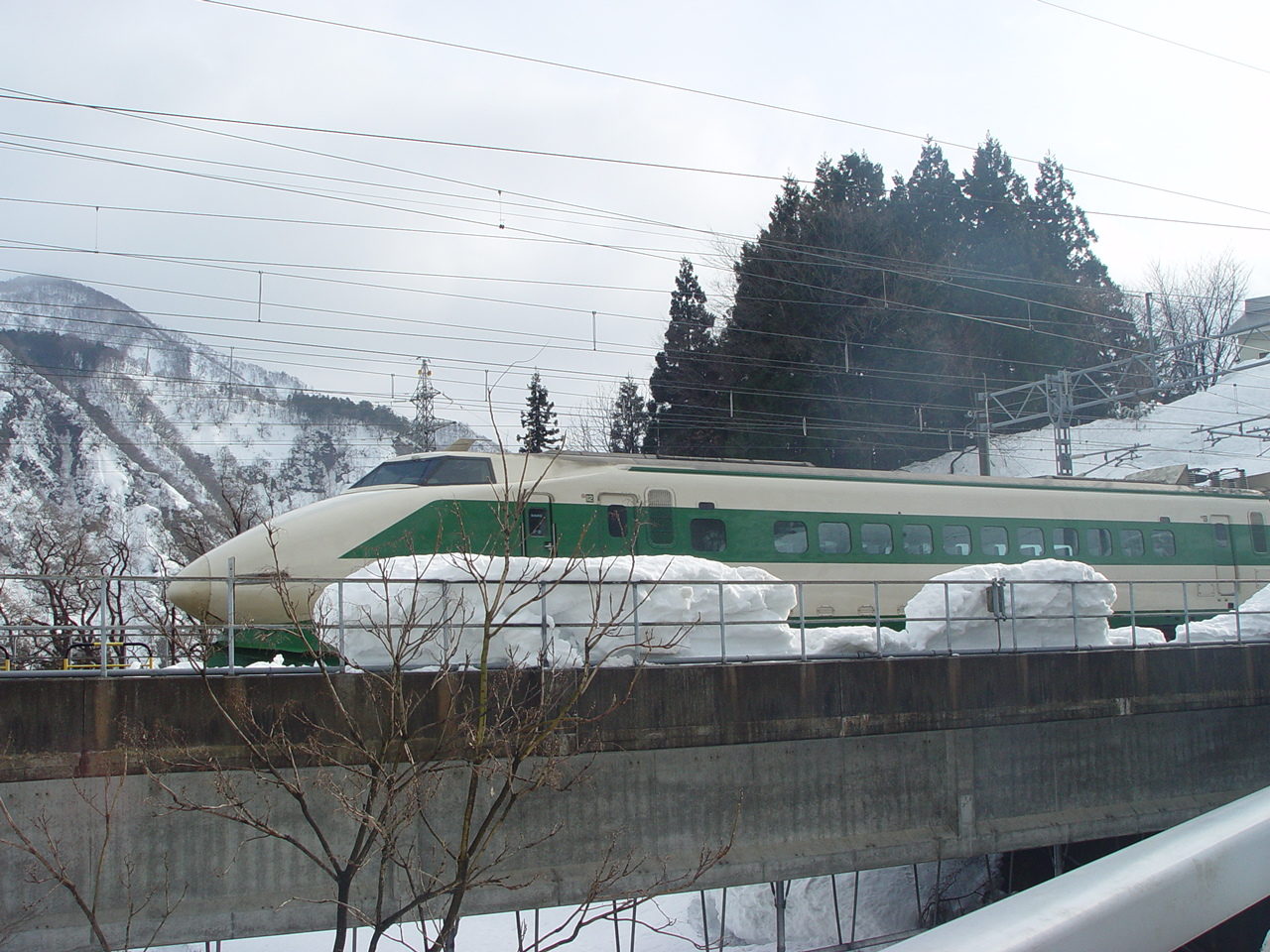
- 200 Series Shinkansen approaching Gala-Yuzawa Station (January 2006)

Overview
- Native name: ガーラ湯沢線
- Owner: JR East
- Locale: Yuzawa, Niigata
- Termini: Echigo-Yuzawa; Gala-Yuzawa
- Stations: 2
- Color on map

Service
- Type: Shinkansen
- Rolling stock: E7 series

History
- Opened: 1990

Technical
- Track length: 1.8 km (1.1 mi)
- Track gauge: 1,435 mm (4 ft 8 1/2 in) standard gauge
- Electrification: Overhead line, 25 kV 50 Hz AC

The Gala-Yuzawa Line (Japanese: ガーラ湯沢線, Hepburn: Gāra-yuzawa-sen) is the unofficial name for a railway branch line in Yuzawa, Niigata, Japan, operated by East Japan Railway Company (JR East).

The standard gauge line is a short 1.8-kilometre (1.1 mi) branch line that extends from Echigo-Yuzawa Station on the Jōetsu Shinkansen to Gala-Yuzawa Station, but is officially classified as a branch of the (narrow gauge) Jōetsu Line. The line has no intermediate stations.

Gala-Yuzawa Station serves the nearby Gala Yuzawa ski resort (ski lifts operate directly from the station), so the station is only used during the winter period. During the skiing season, Tanigawa services from Tokyo are extended to run to Gala-Yuzawa. All trains on the line are classified as "limited express", so a limited express surcharge is required.

The branch line was originally built as an area to store and do light maintenance on trains, but was upgraded for passenger service from 20 December 1990 when JR East developed the ski resort. Outside the winter season, the line is used for switching trains terminating at and departing from Echigo-Yuzawa Station. From 1 October 1997, Tanigawa services were used for the all-stations services between Tokyo and Echigo-Yuzawa, replacing the Toki all stations service, however, this service was revived from December 2002 to replace the Asahi service from Tokyo to Niigata.

== Rolling stock ==
- E7 series (from 3 March 2019)
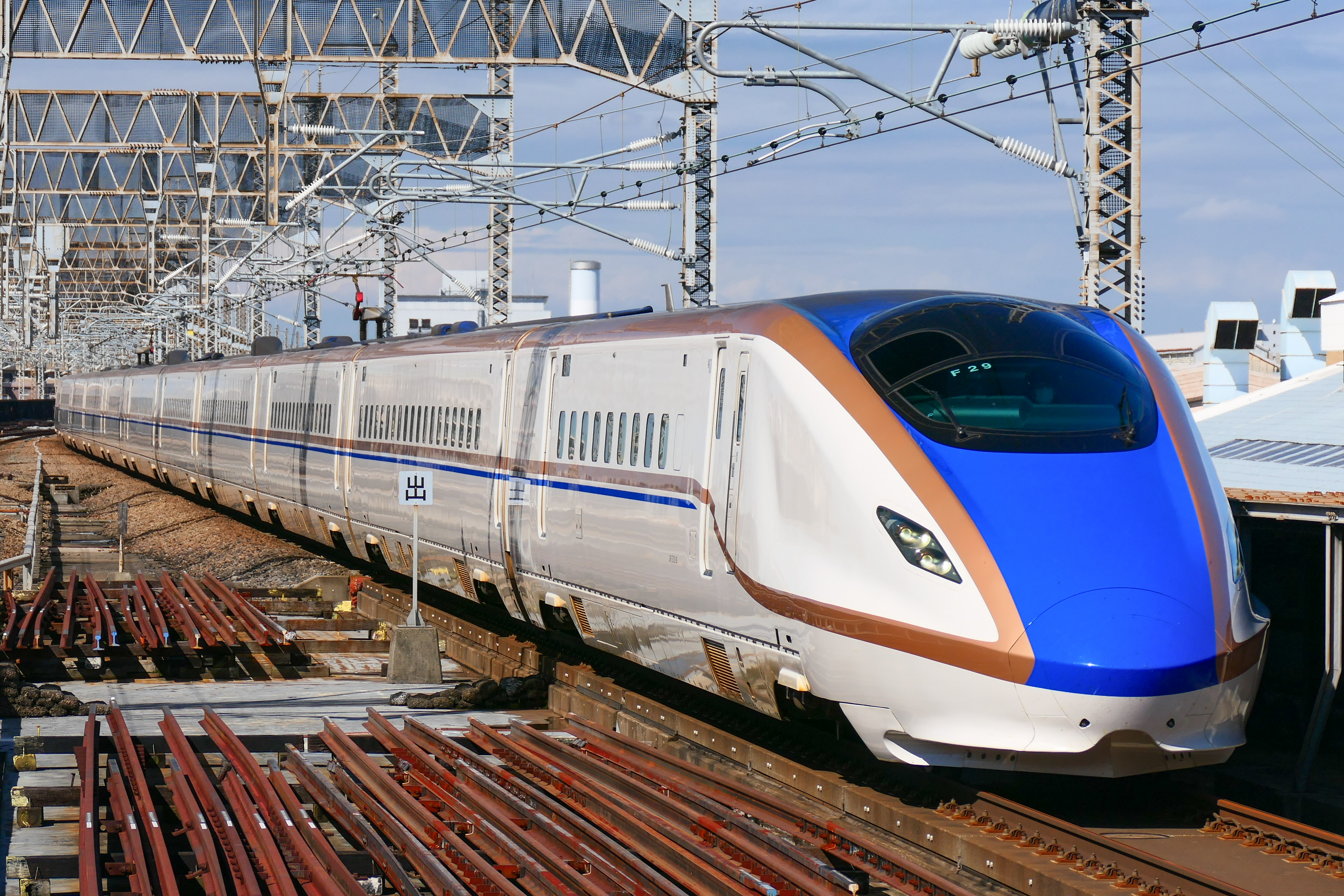
Set F29 of the E7 series Shinkansen on a Tanigawa 410 service entering Omiya Station

== Former rolling stock ==
- 200 series 10-car "K" sets (1 October 1997 – 15 March 2013)
- E1 series (Max Tanigawa) (1 October 1997 - 28 September 2012)
- E2 series 10-car sets (26 January 2013 - 17 March 2023)
- E4 series (Max Tanigawa) (7 May 2001 - 1 October 2021)
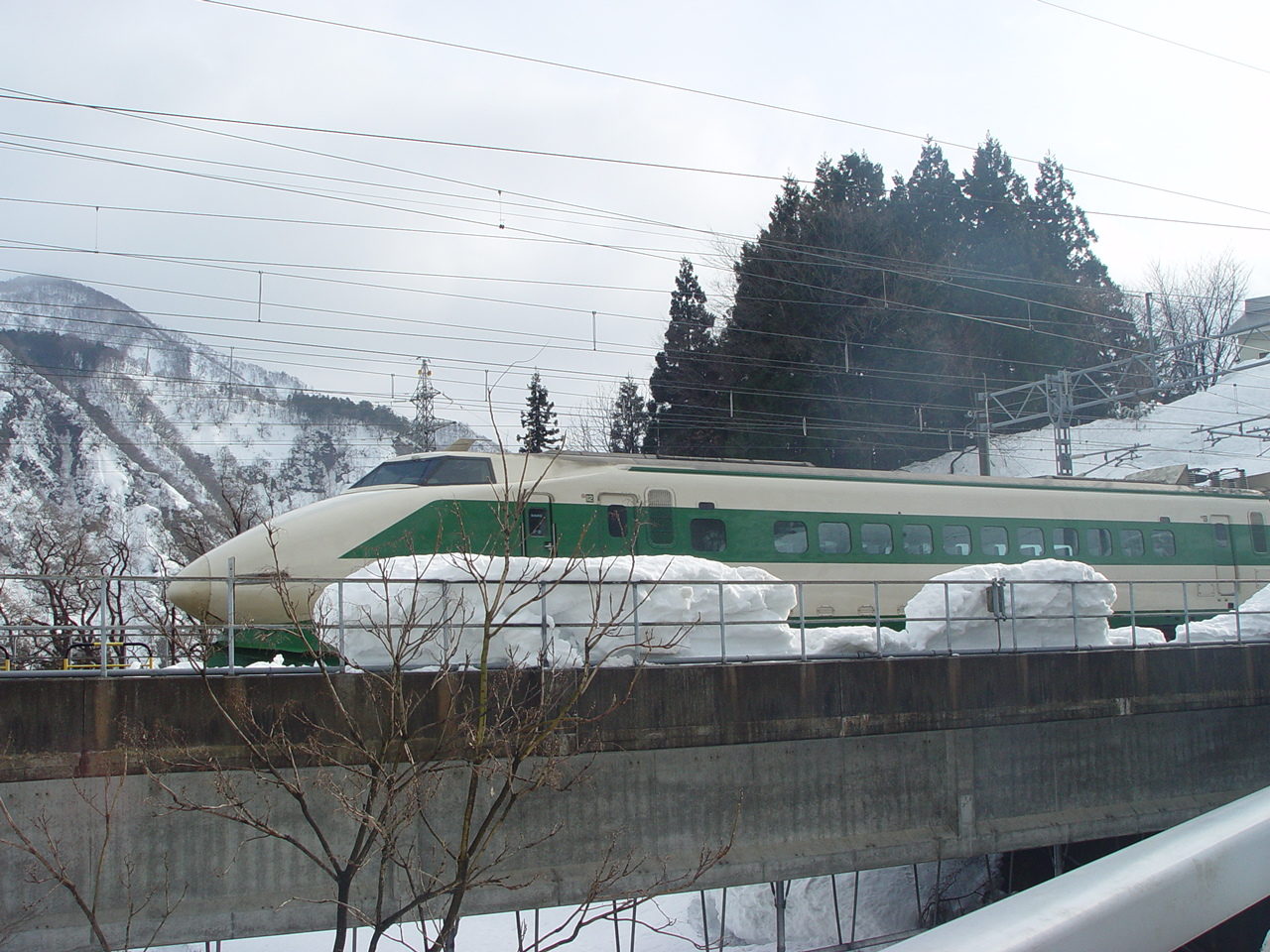
A 200 series Shinkansen approaching Gala Yuzawa station

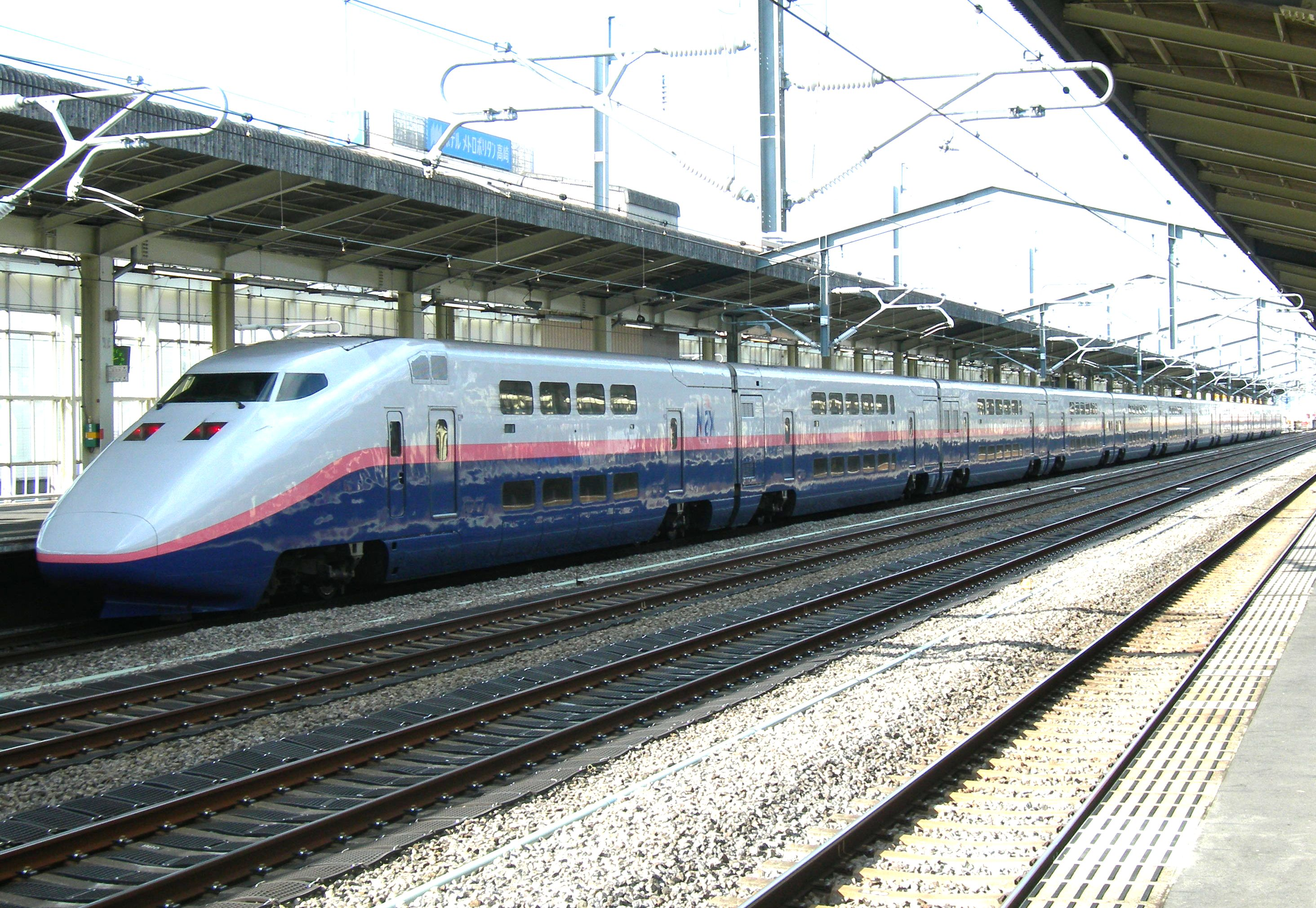
An E1 Shinkansen at Takasaki station

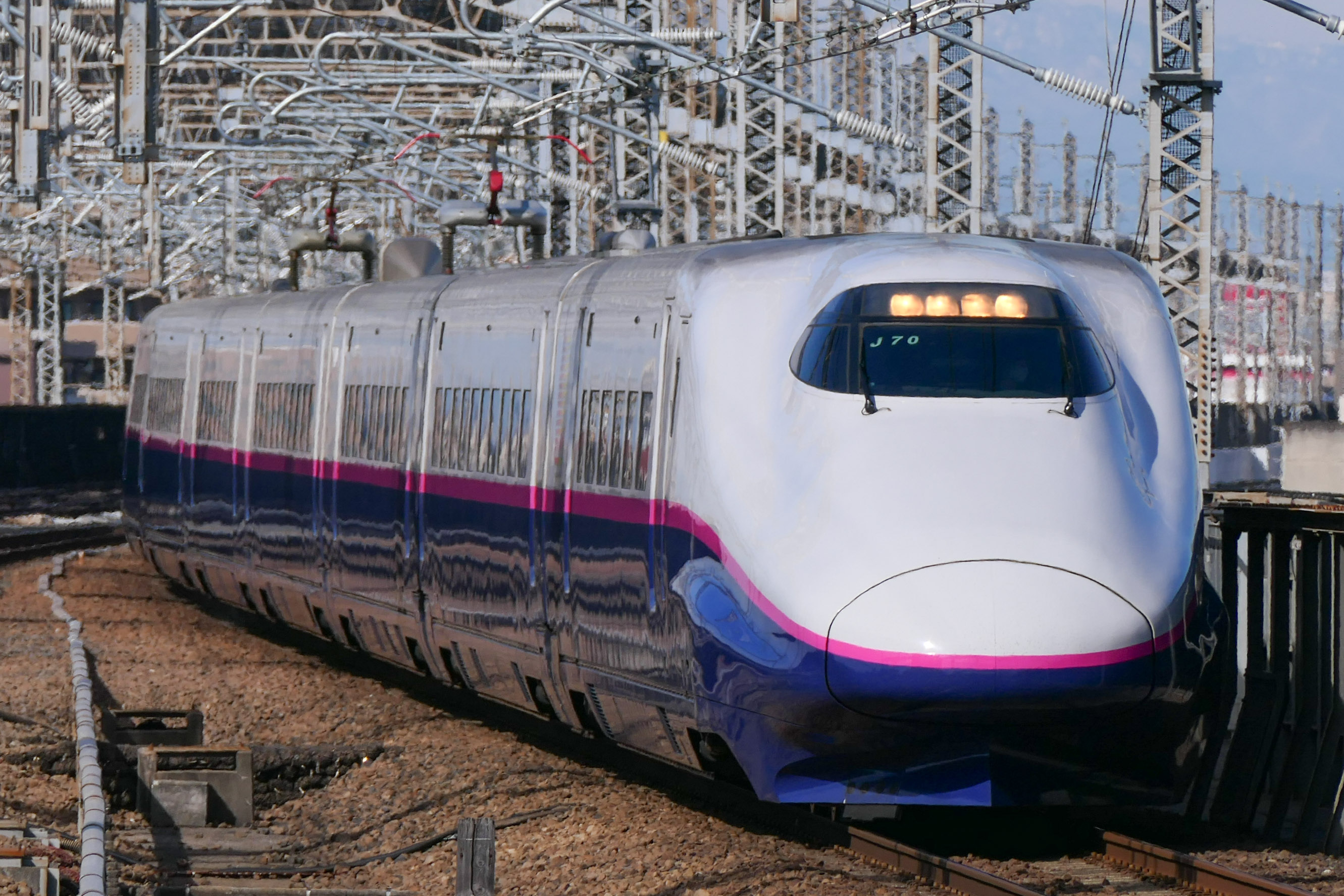
Set J70 of the E2-1000 Shinkansen, similar to those previously used on the Gala-Yuzawa Line

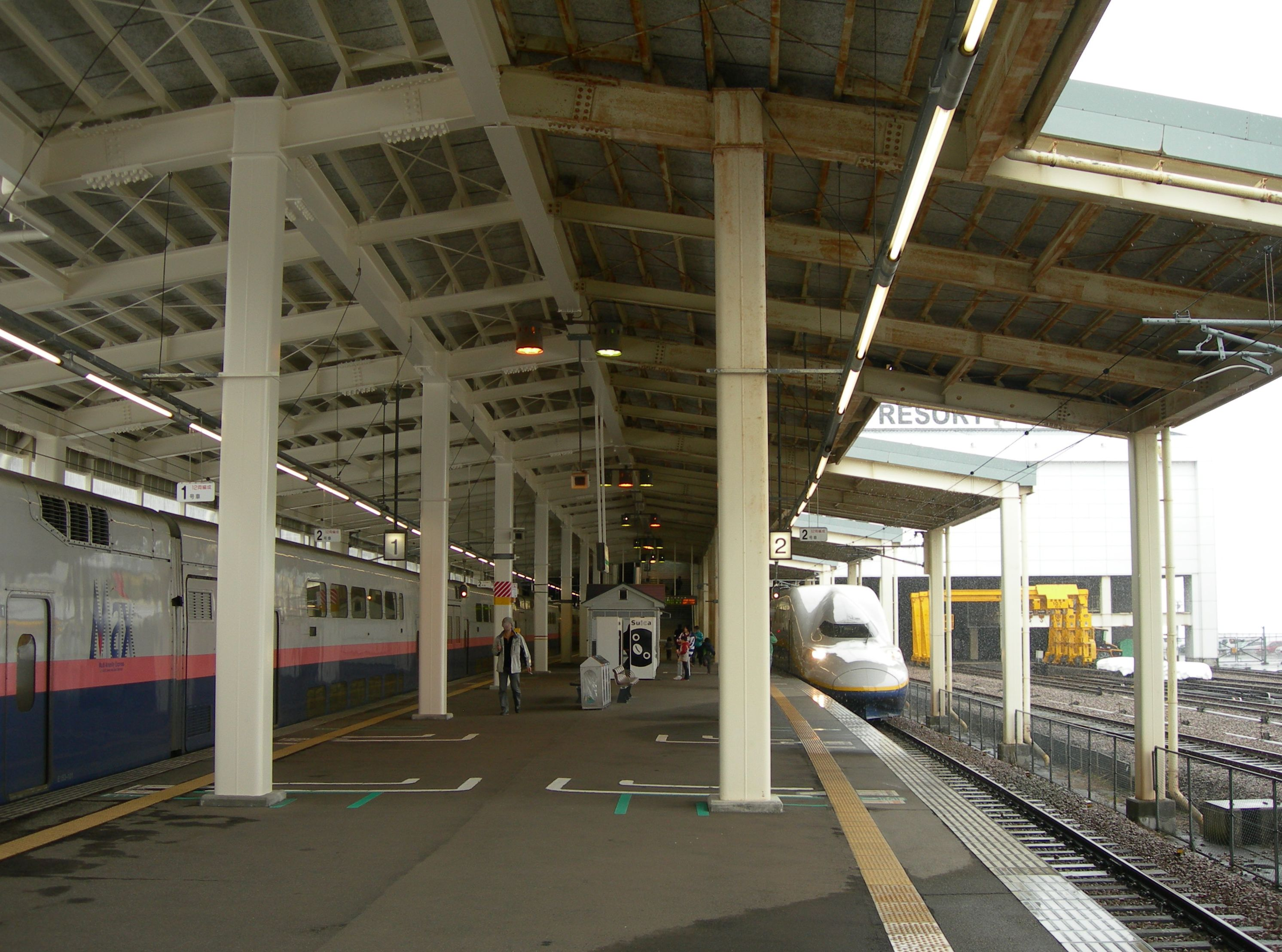
Two E4 series Shinkansen at Gala Yuzawa station, March 2010

== See also ==
- Hakata-Minami Line, a similar section of the Shinkansen network
