= Gala-Yuzawa Station =

Railway station in Japan

Gala-Yuzawa Station ガーラ湯沢駅
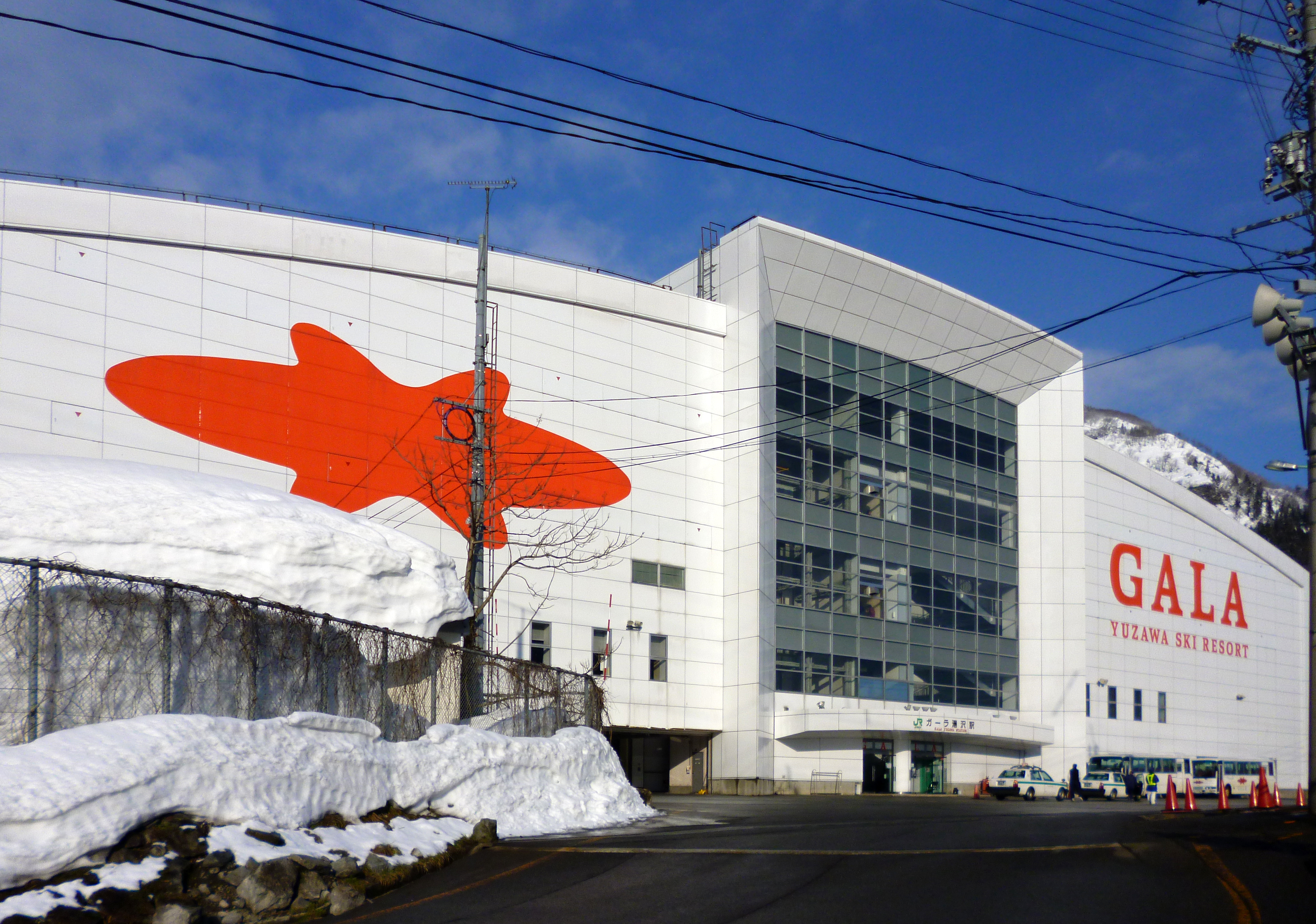
- The station exterior in March 2012

General information
- Location: Yuzawa, Niigata; Japan
- Coordinates: 36.950483°N 138.799478°E
- Operator: JR East
- Line: Gala-Yuzawa Line
- Distance: 1.8 km (1.1 mi) from Echigo-Yuzawa
- Platforms: 1 island platform
- Tracks: 2

Construction
- Structure type: At-grade

Other information
- Status: Seasonal, staffed ("Midori no Madoguchi" )
- Website: Official website

History
- Opened: 20 December 1990

Passengers
- 1,029 per day (FY2017)

Services
Preceding station	JR East	Following station
Echigo-Yuzawa towards Tokyo	Jōetsu Shinkansen Tanigawa	Terminus
Location
- Location within Japan

Gala-Yuzawa Station (Japanese: ガーラ湯沢駅, Hepburn: Gāra-Yuzawa-eki) is a seasonal railway station on the Gala-Yuzawa Line in the town of Yuzawa, Niigata, Japan. Operated by the East Japan Railway Company (JR East), the station serves the adjacent Gala Yuzawa ski resort and is open only during the winter ski season. The station opened on 20 December 1990.

== Services ==
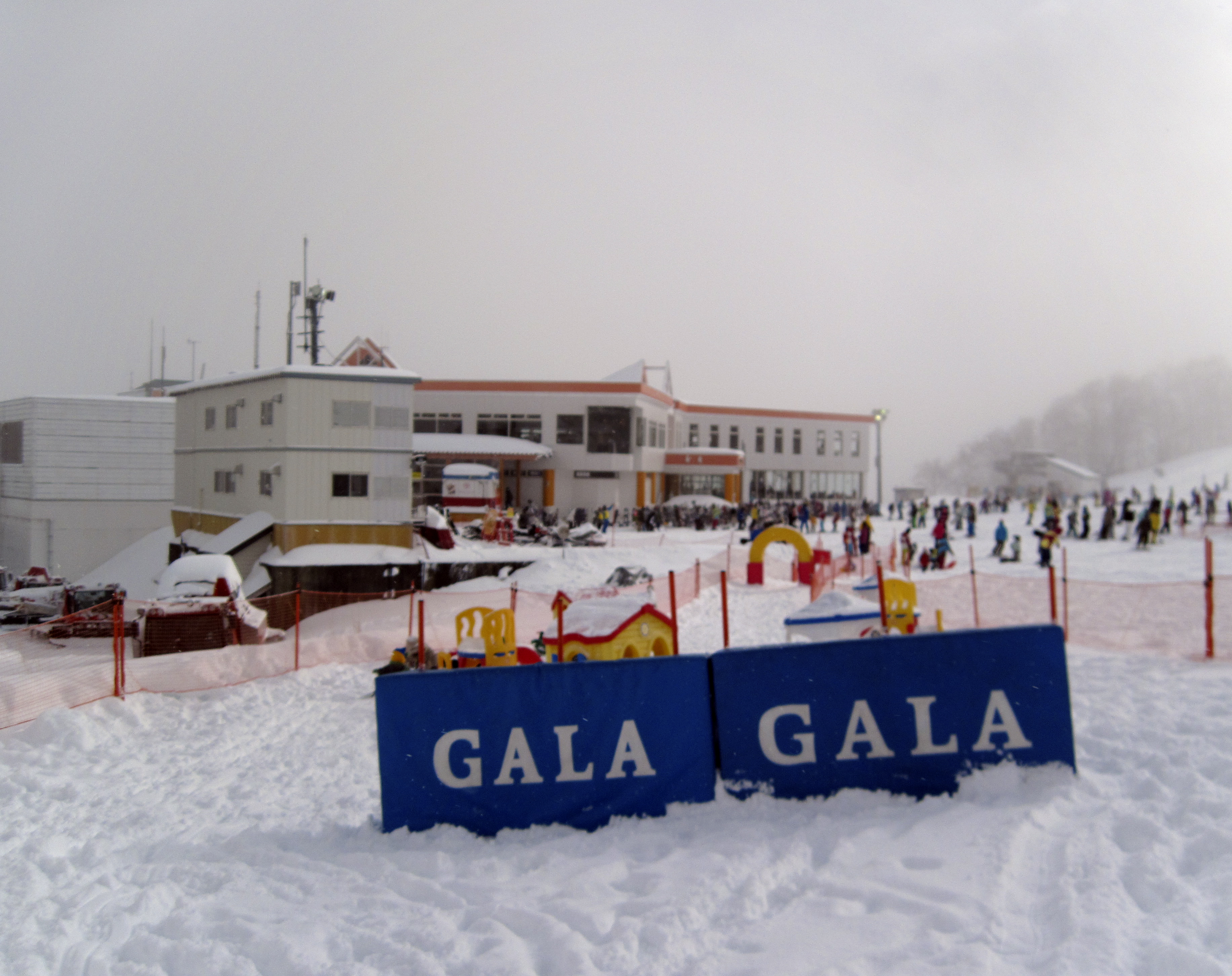
The Gala Yuzawa ski resort

Gala-Yuzawa Station is the sole station on the Gala-Yuzawa Line, a 1.8-kilometre (1.1 mi) branch line from Echigo-Yuzawa Station. All passenger services are operated as extensions of Jōetsu Shinkansen Tanigawa services to and from Tokyo, and are classed as limited express services.

The station operates only during the winter ski season, typically from mid-December until early May.

As of December 2024, there are generally between 10 and 13 departures per day, with some services operating only on weekends or on specific dates. Selected weekend-only services may terminate at Ueno instead of Tokyo.

Journey times to Tokyo are approximately 1 hour 17 minutes to 1 hour 37 minutes.

Outside train operating hours during the winter season, free shuttle buses operate between Gala-Yuzawa Station and Echigo-Yuzawa Station, where additional Shinkansen and conventional rail services are available.

== Station layout ==
The station consists of a single island platform serving two tracks. Facilities include a staffed Midori no Madoguchi ticket office, ticket vending machines, and automatic ticket gates.

The station entrance and exit are located inside the main building of the Gala Yuzawa Ski Resort, which is owned by the JR East Group.

=== Platforms ===
1-2	■ Gala Yuzawa Line	for Echigo-Yuzawa, Omiya, and Tokyo

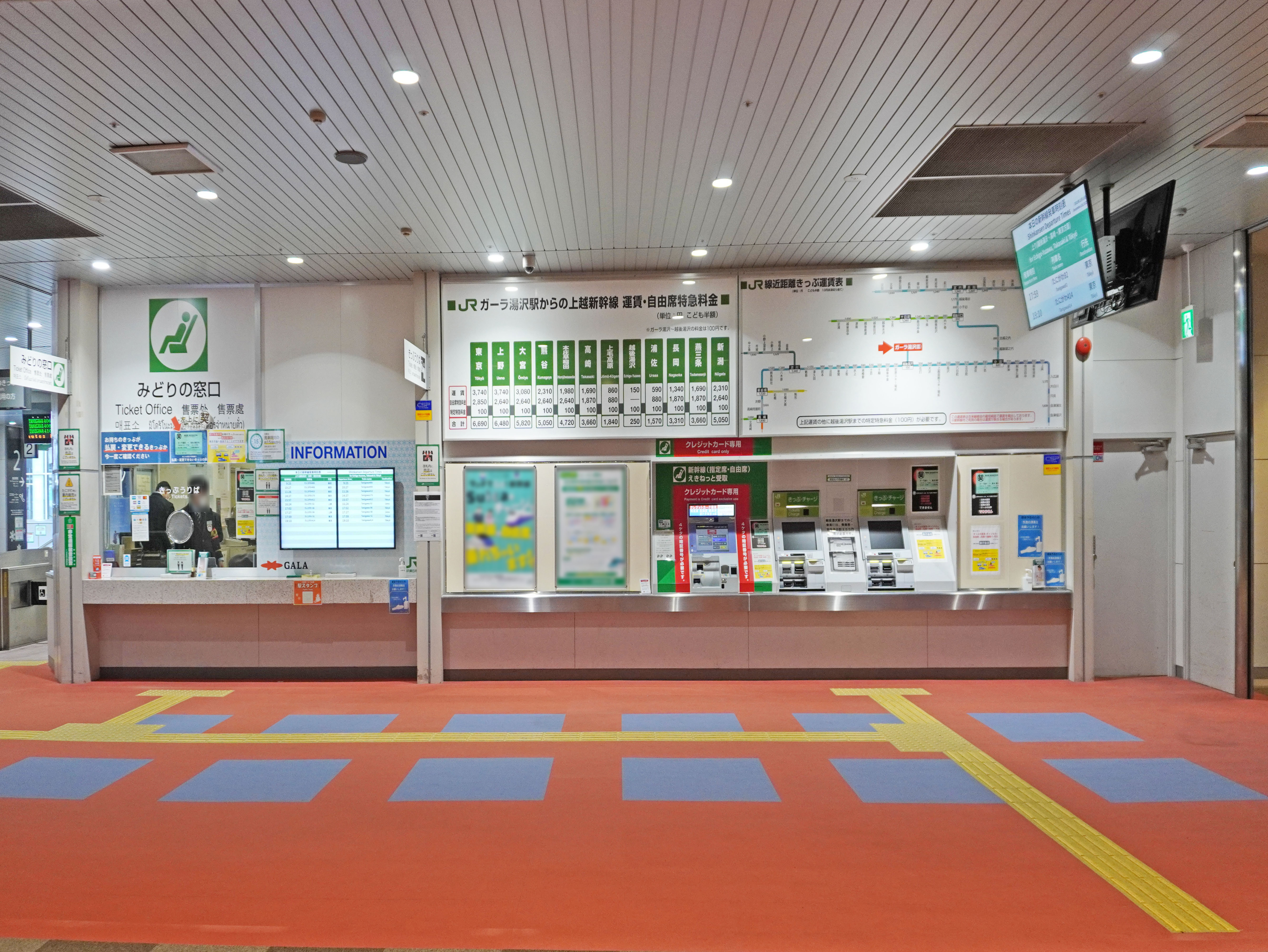
Ticket counter and ticket machines, December 2022

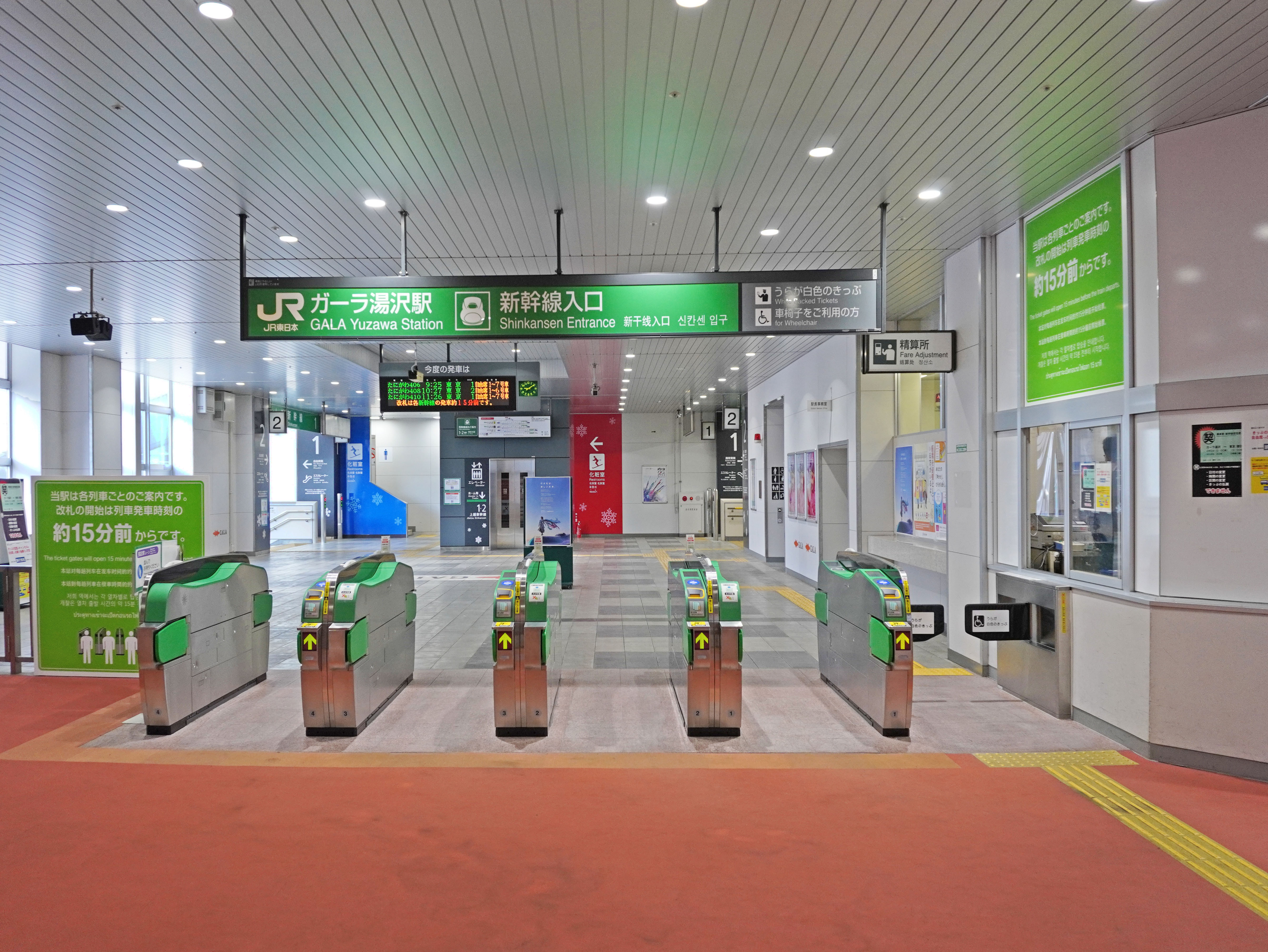
Ticket gates, December 2022

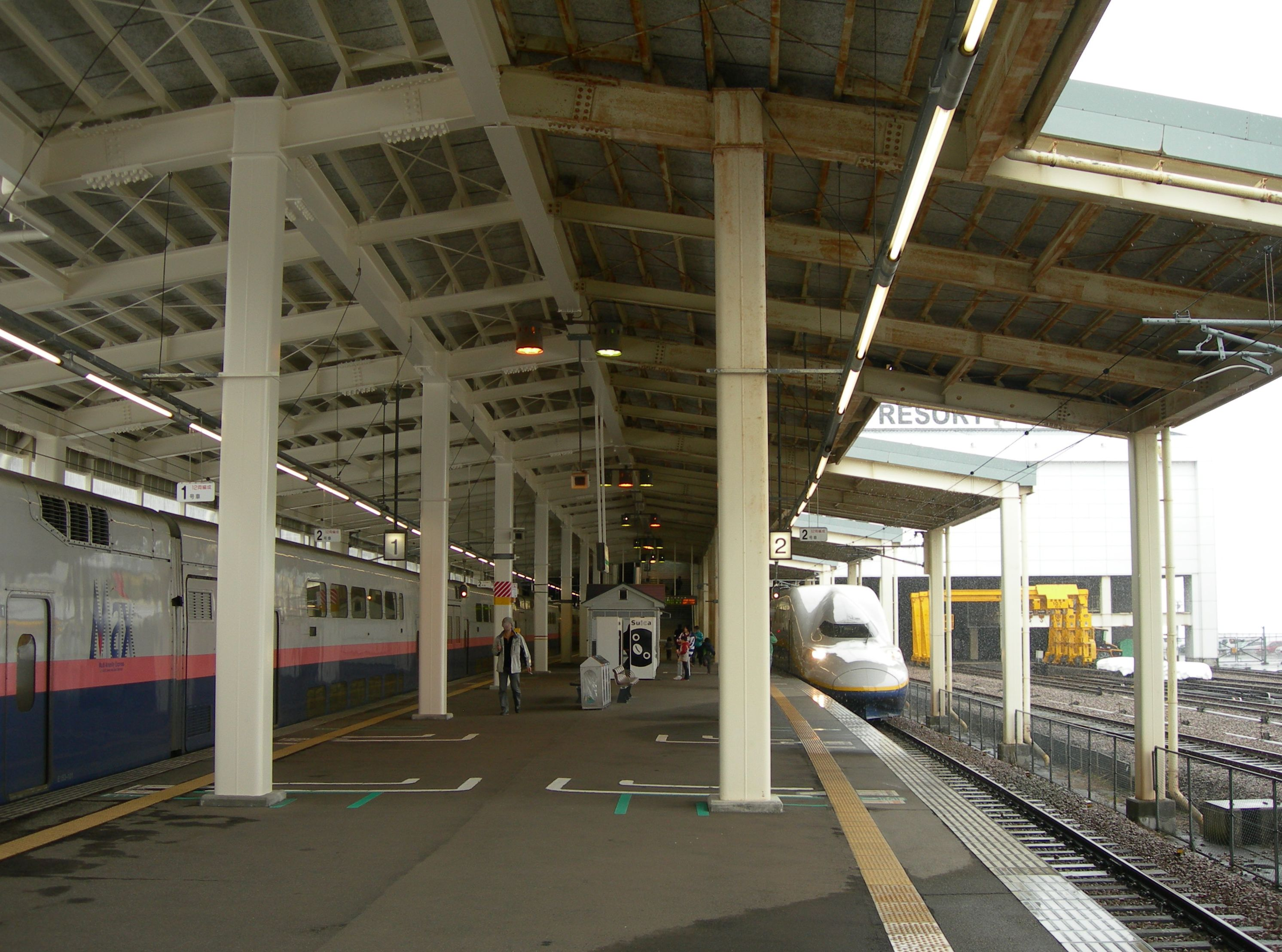
Platform, March 2010

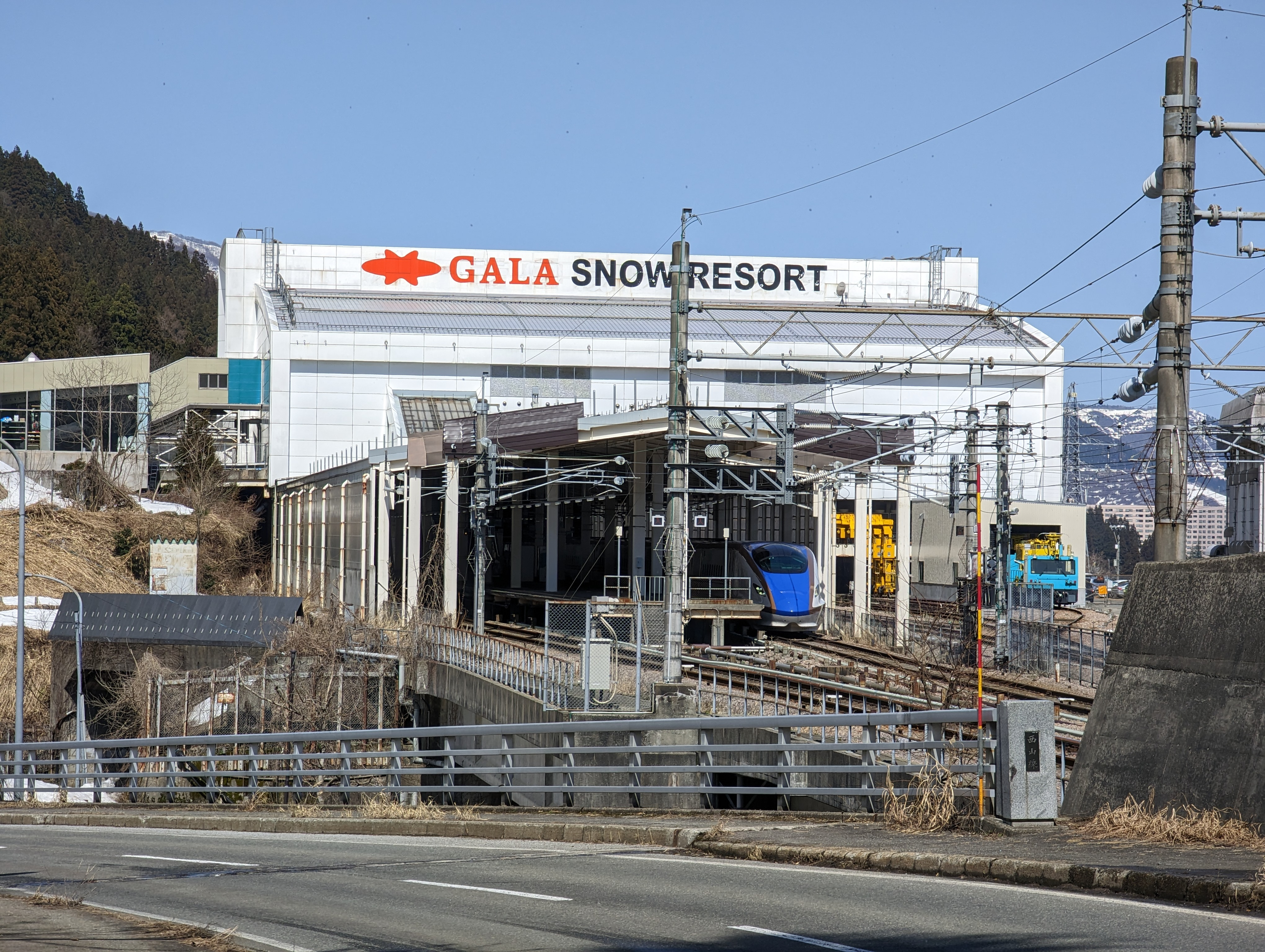
Platform, underneath Ski Resort main building, March 2023

== Passenger statistics ==
In fiscal 2017, the station was used by an average of 1,029 boarding passengers daily. The passenger figures for previous years are as shown below.

Fiscal year	Daily average
2000	907
2005	987
2010	941
2015	1,127

== See also ==
- List of railway stations in Japan
