= Tanigawa (train) =

Japanese high-speed Shinkansen train service

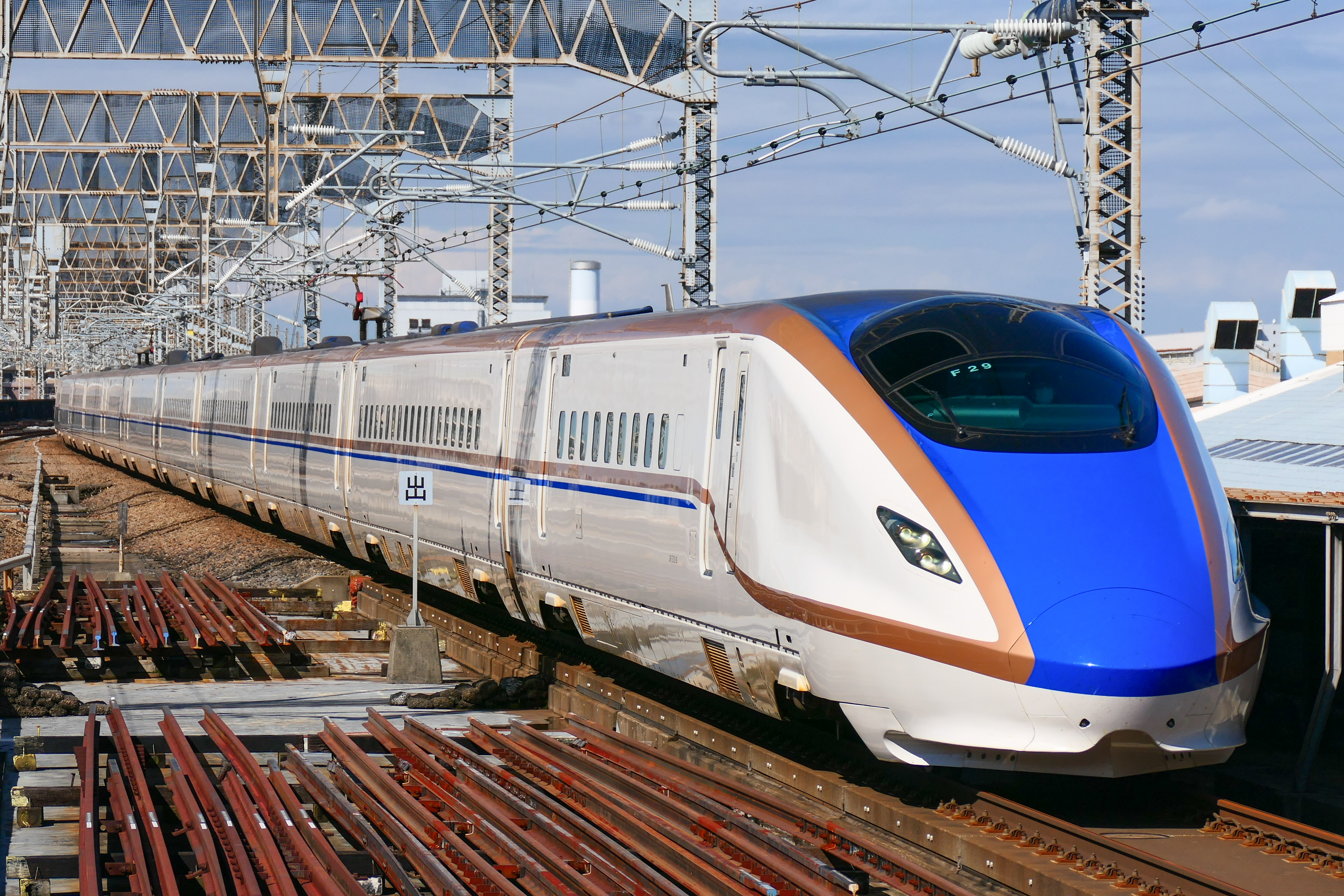
- E7 series set F29 on a Joetsu Shinkansen Tanigawa service in 2022

Overview
- Service type: Shinkansen (Local)
- Status: Operational
- Locale: Honshu, Japan
- Predecessor: Toki
- First service: 15 November 1982 (Limited express); 1 October 1997 (Shinkansen)
- Current operator: JR East
- Former operator: JNR

Route
- Termini: Tokyo; Echigo-Yuzawa or Gala Yuzawa
- Lines used: Joetsu Shinkansen; Gala-Yuzawa Line

On-board services
- Class: Standard + Green + Gran Class
- Catering facilities: Trolley service

Technical
- Rolling stock: E7 series
- Track gauge: 1,435 mm (4 ft 8 1/2 in) standard gauge
- Electrification: 25 kV 50 Hz AC (Overhead line)
- Operating speed: 275 km/h (170 mph)

The Tanigawa (たにがわ) is a high-speed train service operated by the East Japan Railway Company (JR East) on the Jōetsu Shinkansen in Japan.

== Rolling stock ==
- E7 series (from 3 March 2019)
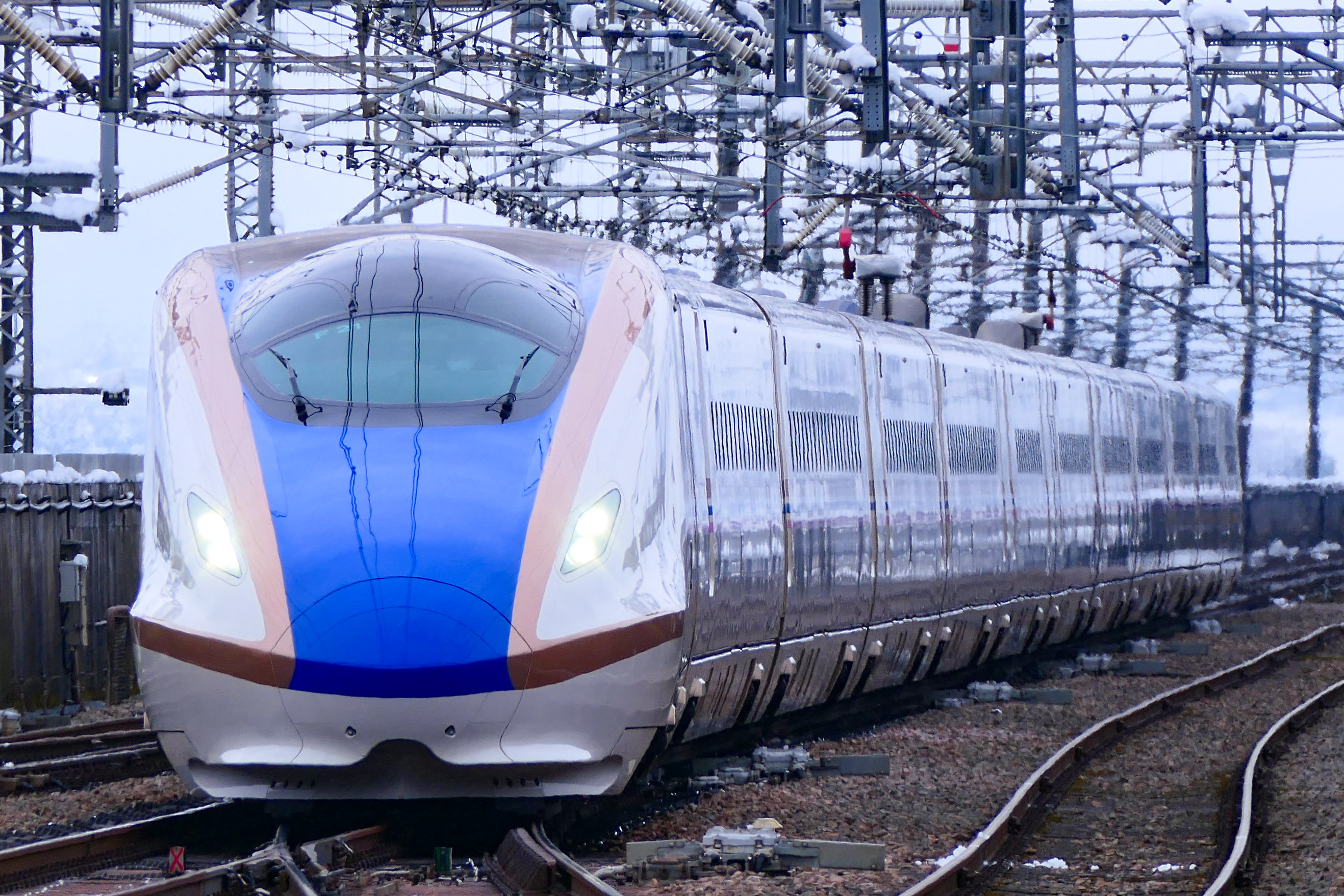
An E7 series shinkansen train

=== Former rolling stock ===
- 185 series EMUs (15 November 1982 - September 1997)
- E1 series (Max Tanigawa) (until September 2012)
- 200 series 10-car "K" sets (1 October 1997 – 15 March 2013)
- E2 series 10-car sets (26 January 2013 until 17 March 2023)
- E4 series (Max Tanigawa) (7 May 2001 - 1 October 2021)
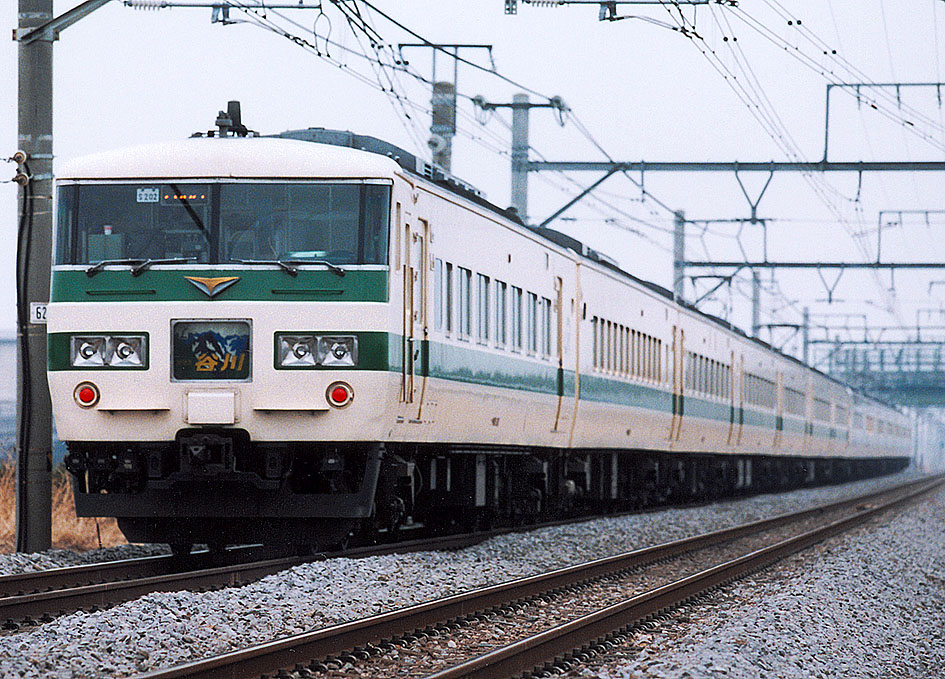
Tanigawa limited express service operated by 185 series EMUs in the 1980s

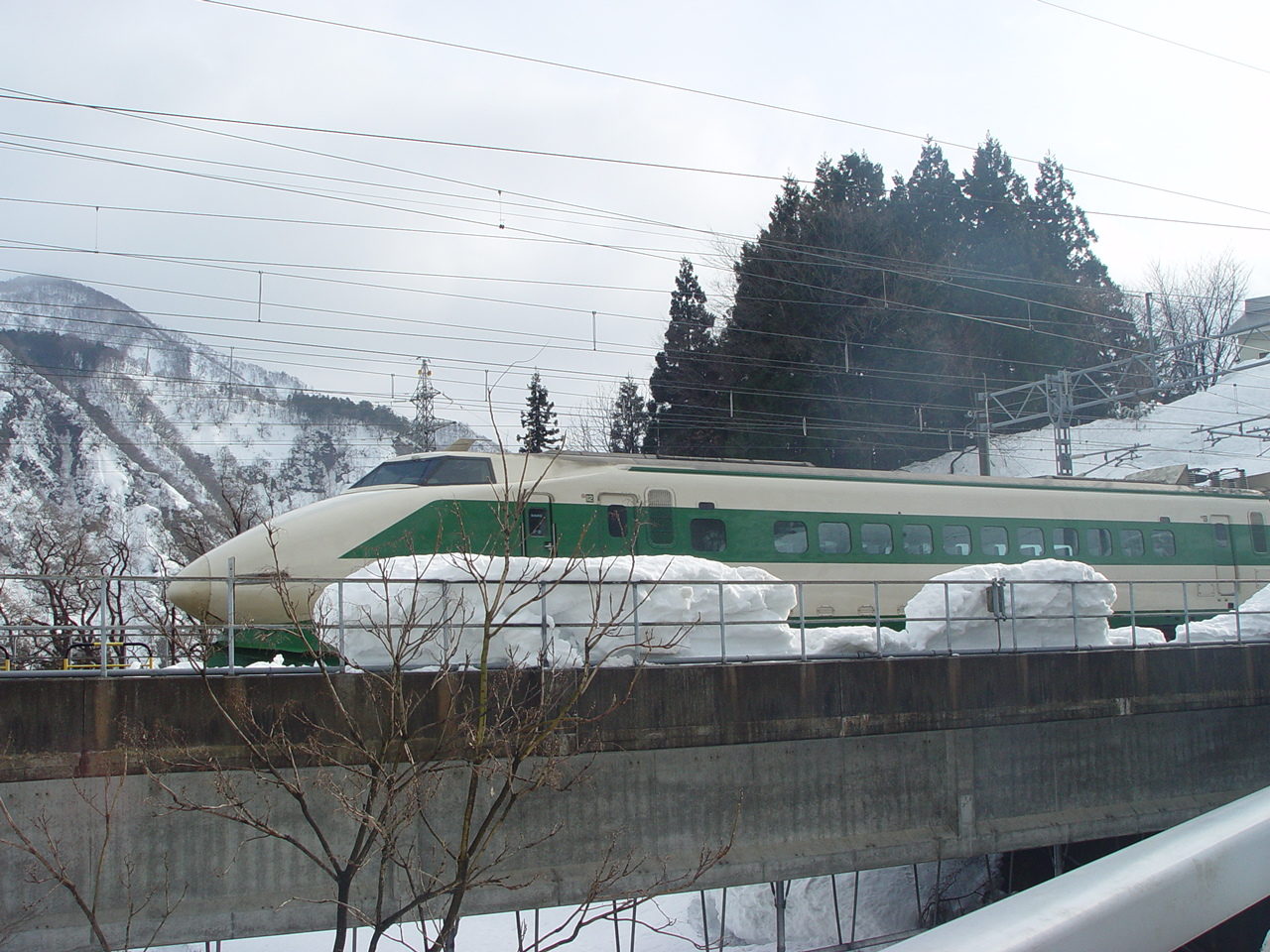
200 series shinkansen train on Tanigawa service near Gala-Yuzawa Station

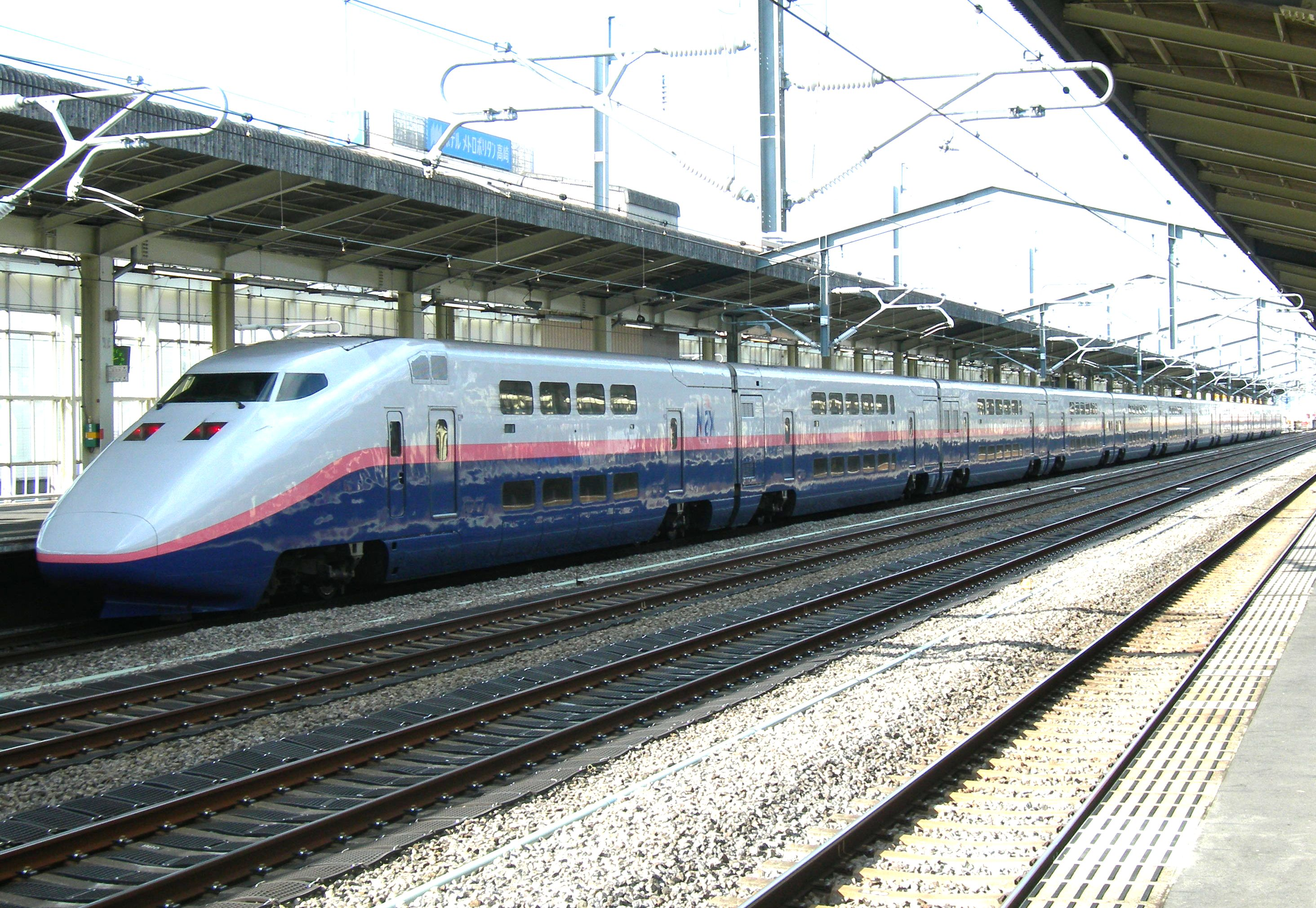
E1 series at Takasaki Station

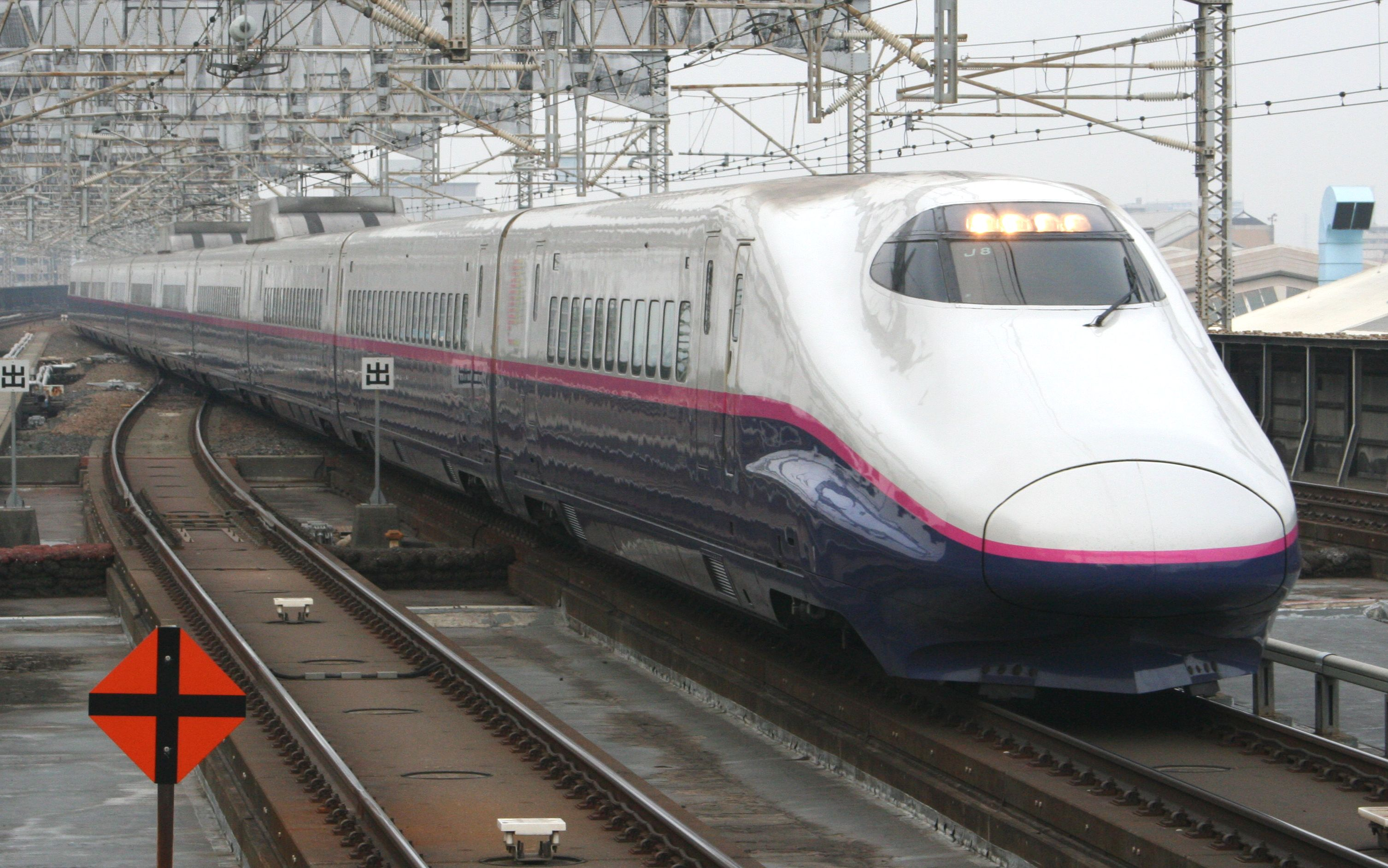
An E2 series Shinkansen train

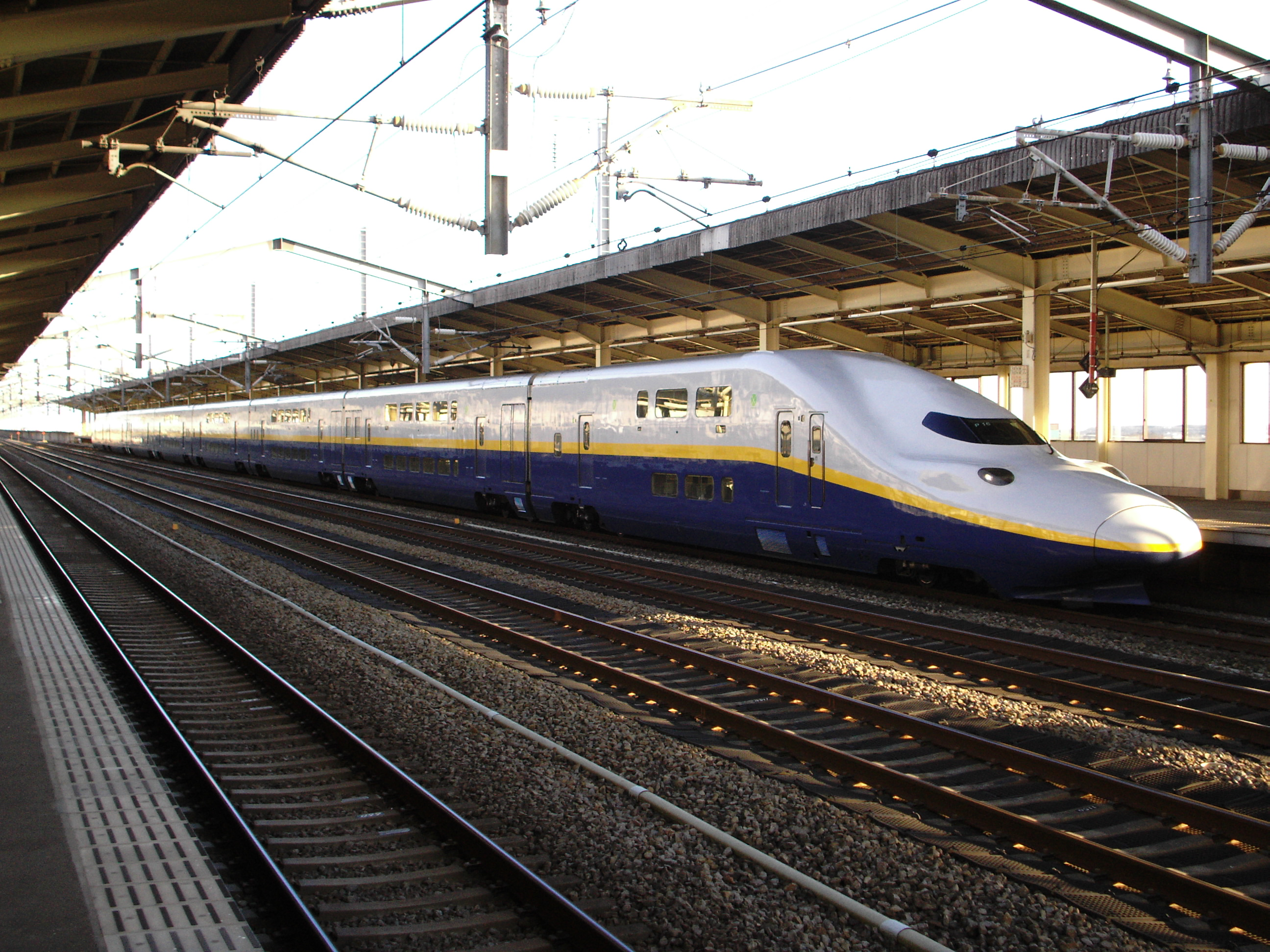
E4 series in January 2007

== History ==
The name Tanigawa (written as "谷川") was first introduced on 15 November 1982 for limited express services operating between Ueno in Tokyo and Minakami on the Jōetsu Line.

From 1 October 1997, the name (written as "たにがわ") was used for the all-stations services between Tokyo and Echigo-Yuzawa on the Jōetsu Shinkansen, replacing the previous Toki all-stations services. During the winter skiing season, trains terminate and start at the seasonal Gala-Yuzawa Station.

E2 series 10-car sets were introduced on three return Tanigawa services daily from 26 January 2013, operating at a maximum speed of 240 km/h (150 mph).

E2 series sets were removed from Tanigawa services (as well as the faster Toki services on the Joetsu Shinkansen) on the 18 March 2023 timetable revision as the line underwent an operating speed increase from 240 to 275 km/h (149 to 171 mph).

== See also ==
- List of named passenger trains of Japan
