= Toki (train) =

Japanese high-speed Shinkansen train service

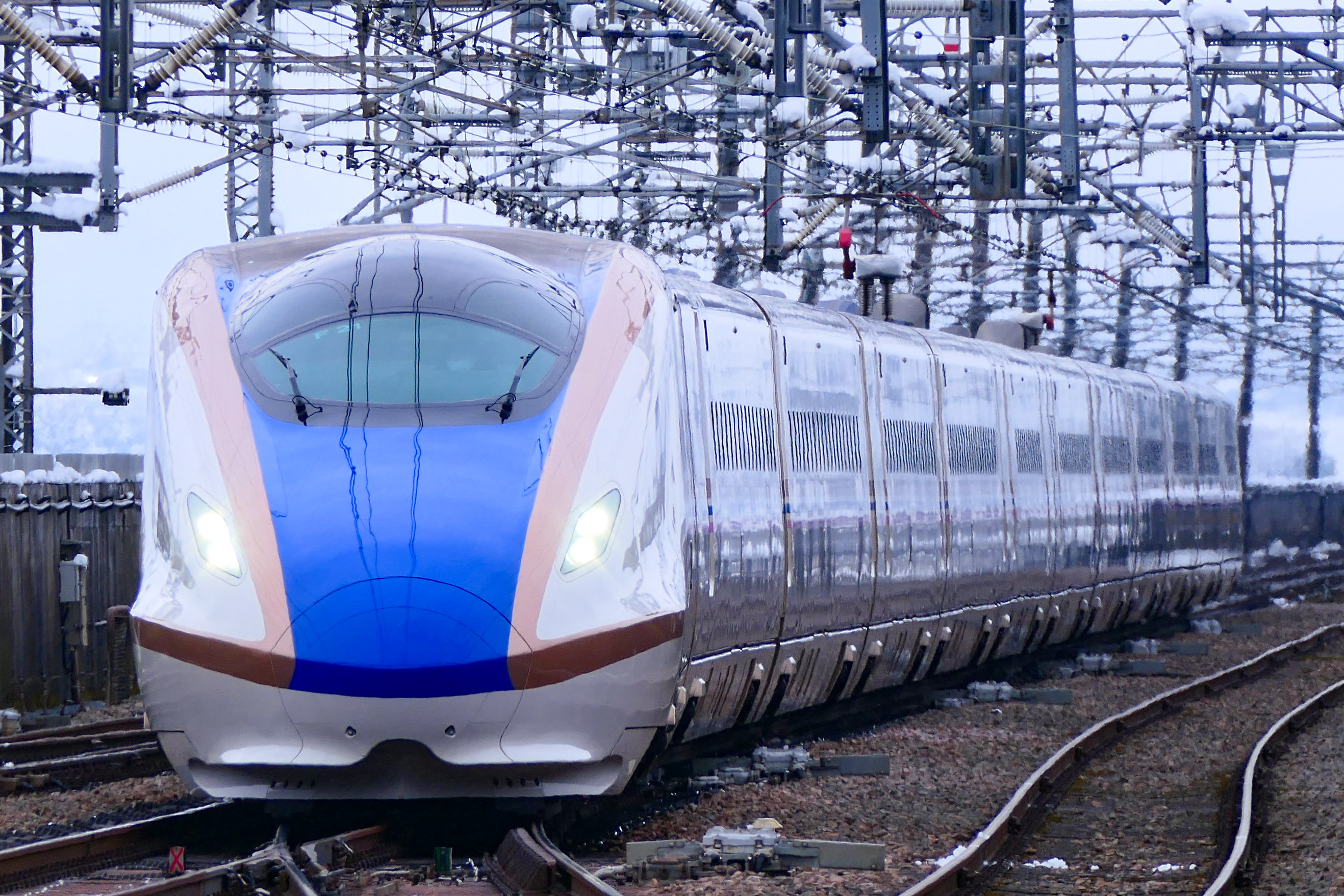
- E7 series set operating a Toki service entering Urasa Station, January 2021

Overview
- Service type: Shinkansen (Limited-stop)
- Status: Operational
- Locale: Honshu, Japan
- First service: 10 June 1962 (Limited express); 15 November 1982 (Shinkansen)
- Current operator: JR East
- Former operator: JNR

Route
- Termini: Tokyo; Niigata
- Line used: Joetsu Shinkansen

On-board services
- Class: Standard + Green + Gran Class
- Catering facilities: Trolley service

Technical
- Rolling stock: E7 series
- Track gauge: 1,435 mm (4 ft 8 1/2 in)
- Electrification: 25 kV AC (50 Hz), overhead
- Operating speed: 275 km/h (170 mph)

The Toki (とき) is a high-speed Shinkansen train service operated by East Japan Railway Company (JR East) on the Joetsu Shinkansen in Japan.

The name is taken from the Japanese name of the crested ibis, for which Niigata is famous.

== Station Stops ==
- Tokyo
- Ueno**
- Ōmiya
- Kumagaya*
- Honjo-Waseda*
- Takasaki*
- Jomo-Kogen*
- Echigo-Yuzawa*
- Urasa*
- Nagaoka**
- Tsubame-Sanjo*
- Niigata

(*) Not served by all trains

(**) Not served by Toki 311 and 312 only

== Rolling stock ==
- E7 series 12-car sets (Toki) (from 3 March 2019)
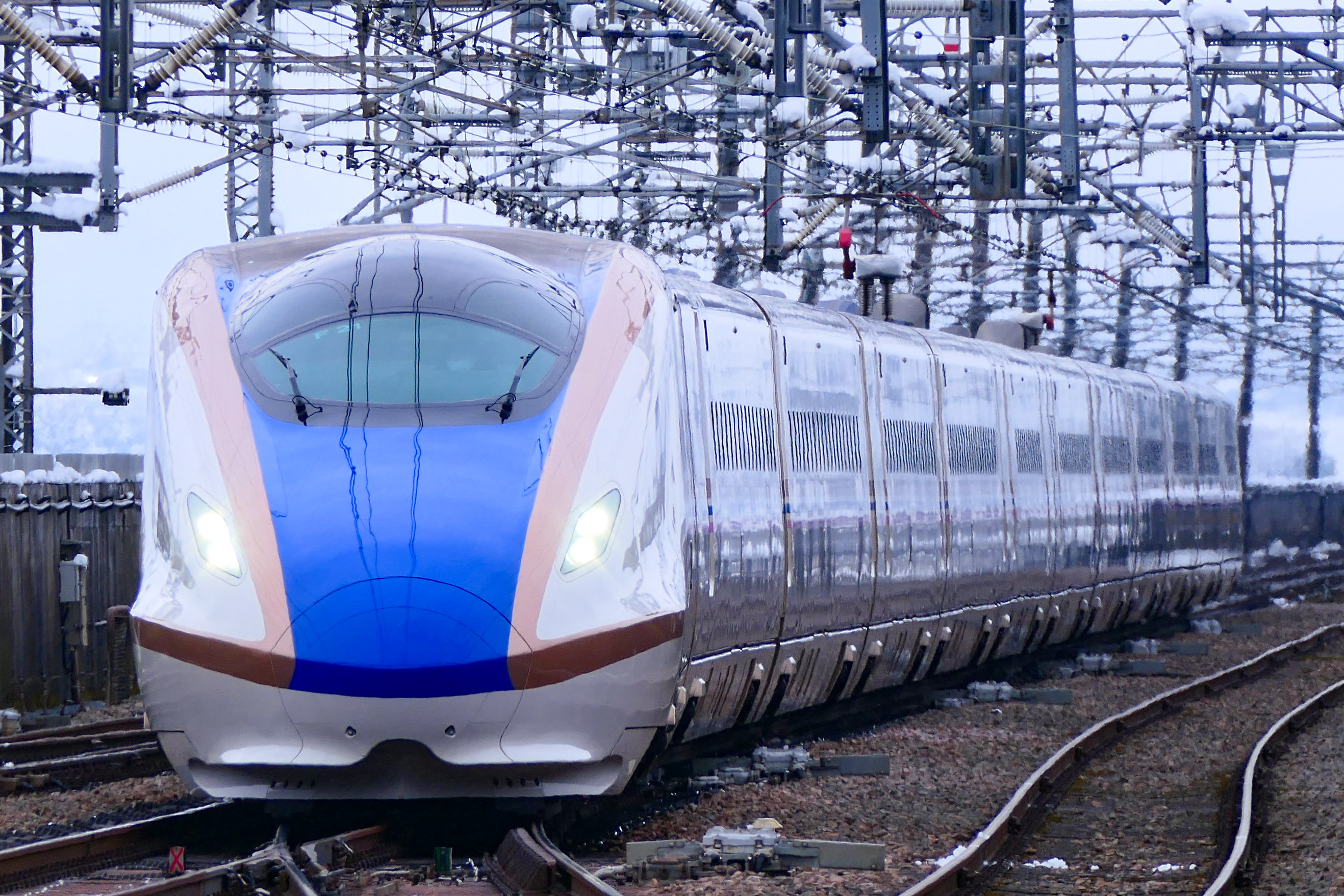
An E7 series set

=== Former rolling stock ===
- E1 series 12-car sets (Max Toki) (until 28 September 2012)
- 200 series 10-car sets (until 15 March 2013)
- E2 series 10-car sets (26 January 2013 until 17 March 2023)
- E4 series 8-car sets (Max Toki) (7 May 2001 - 1 October 2021)
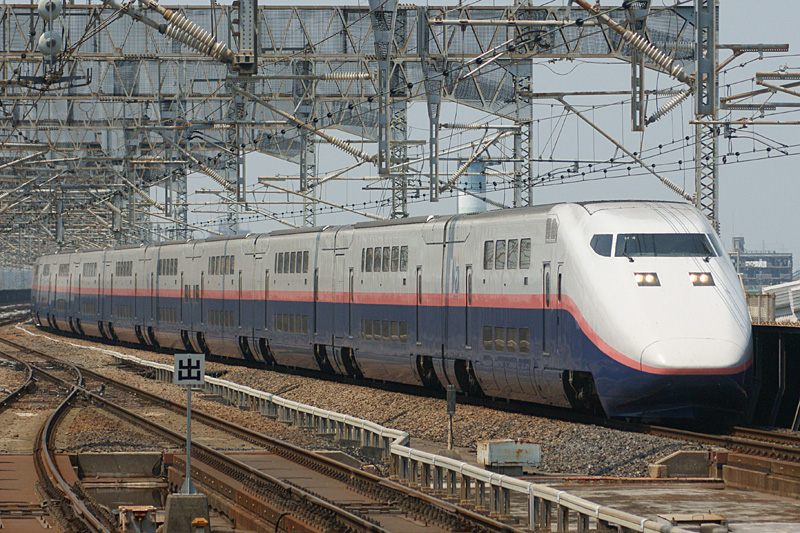
A refurbished E1 series set

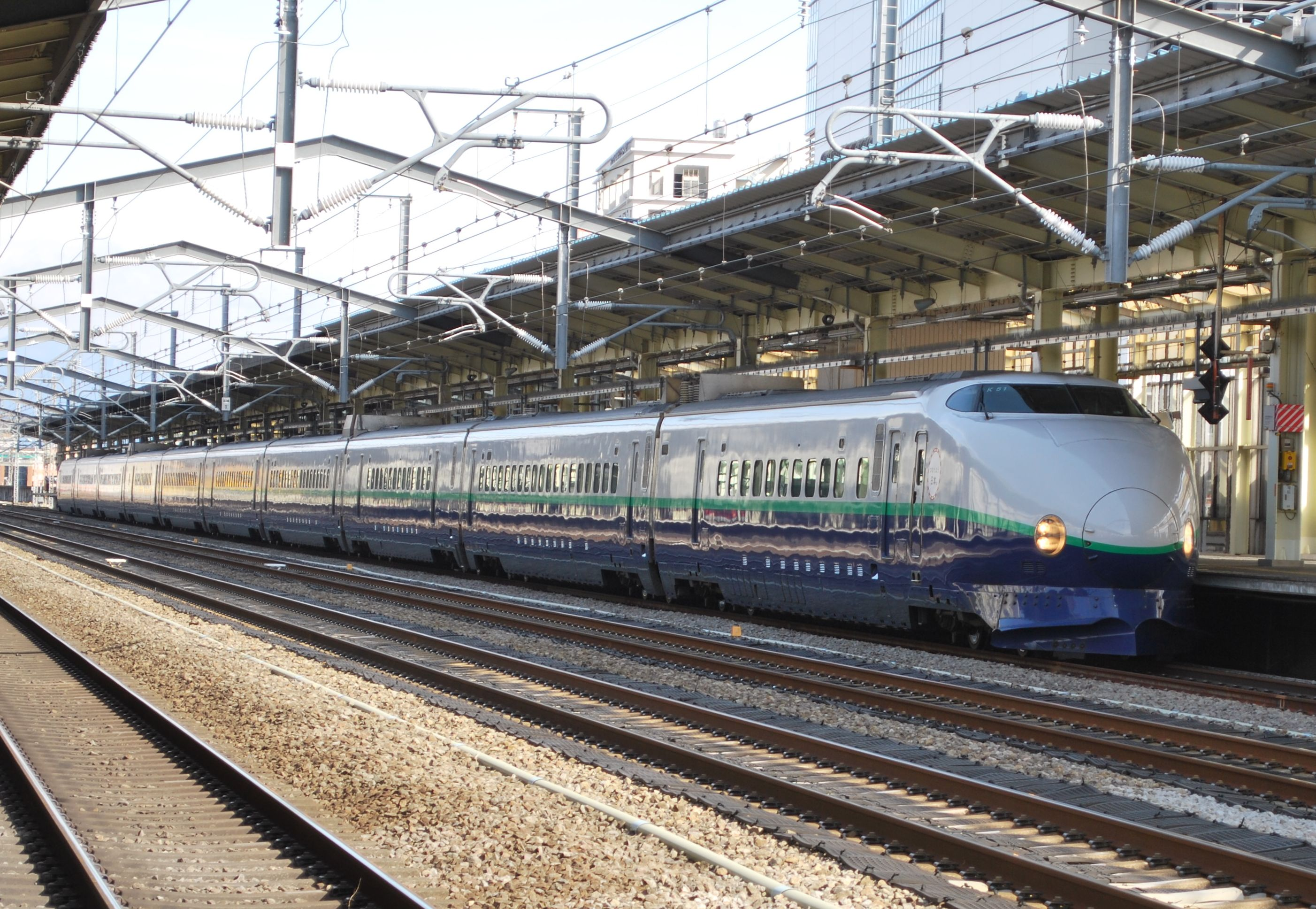
A refurbished 200 series set

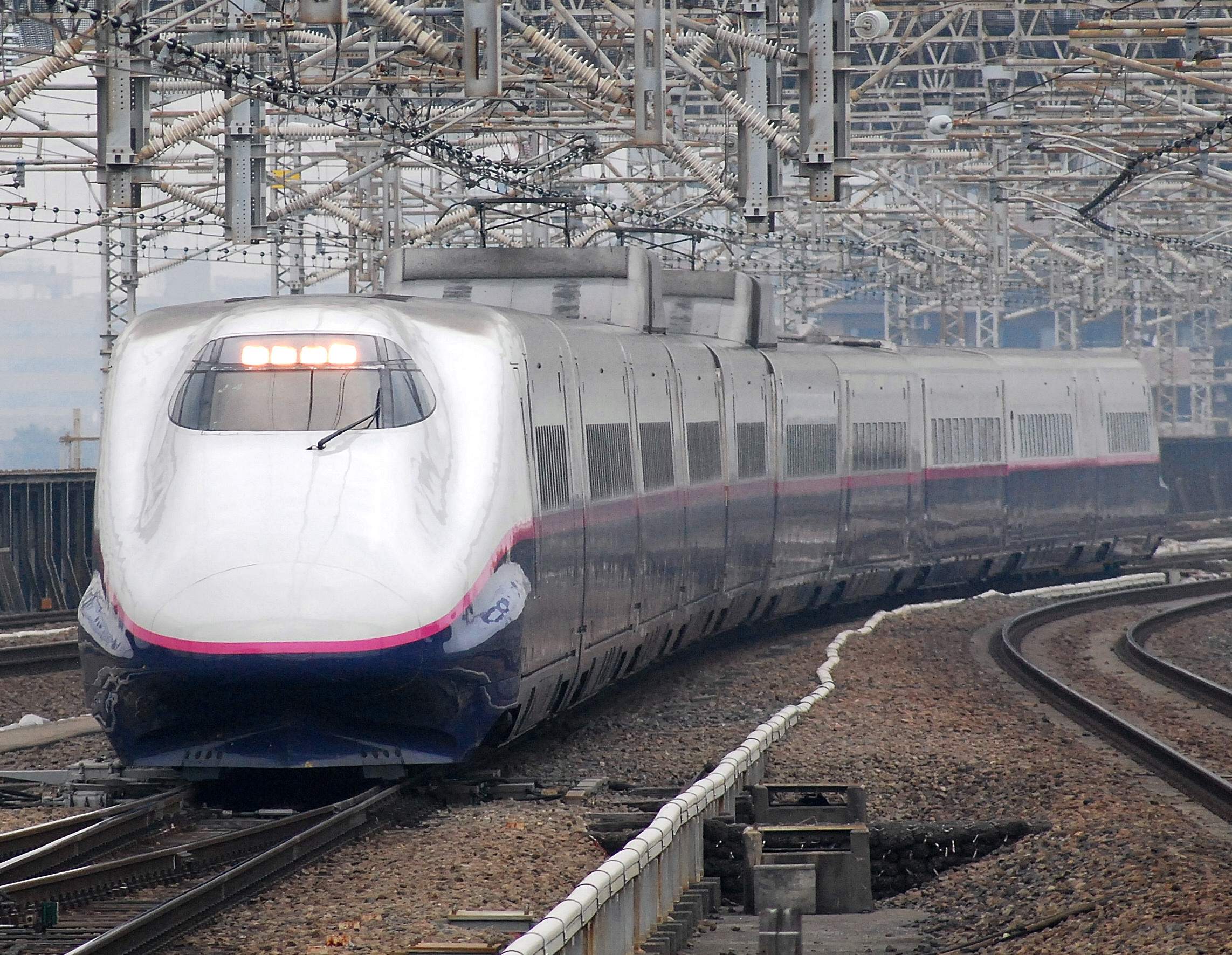
A refurbished E2 series trainset

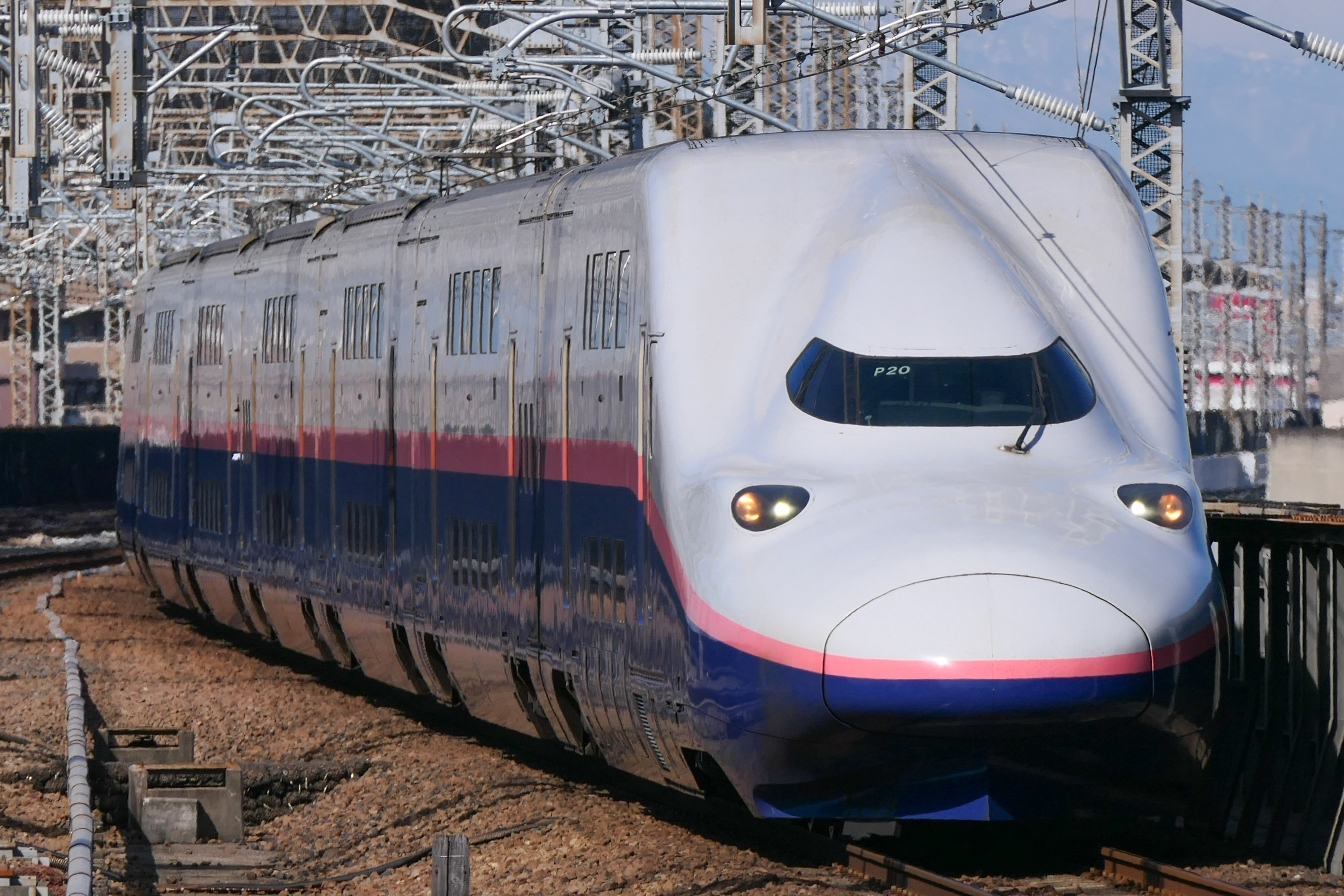
A refurbished E4 series set

== History ==
=== Limited express ===
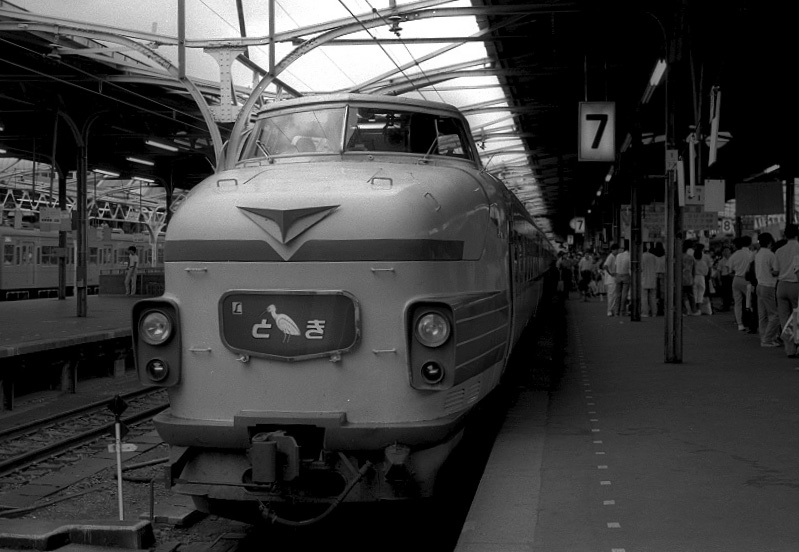
A 181 series EMU on a Toki service in 1982

The name Toki was first introduced on 10 June 1962 for limited express services operating between Ueno in Tokyo and Niigata on the Joetsu Line.These services stopped at Ōmiya, Minakami, Echigo-Yuzawa, Urasa, Nagaoka, Higashi-Sanjō and Niitsu This service operated until 14 November 1982, the day before the Joetsu Shinkansen opened.

=== Shinkansen ===
From the start of services on the newly opened Jōetsu Shinkansen on 15 November 1982, Toki became the name used for the all-stations shinkansen services operating initially between Ōmiya and Niigata, later between Ueno and Niigata, and eventually between Tokyo and Niigata.

The Toki name was discontinued from October 1997 following the introduction of new Tanigawa all-stations services between Tokyo and Echigo-Yuzawa. However, the name was reinstated from December 2002 to replace the name Asahi used for all Tokyo to Niigata trains.

E2 series 10-car sets were re-introduced on four return Toki services daily from 26 January 2013, operating at a maximum speed of 240 km/h (150 mph).

The E4 series sets were retired at the beginning of October 2021, marking the end of bi-level high-speed trains operating on Shinkansen services.

E2 series sets were removed from all Toki services (as well as the slower Tanigawa services on the Joetsu Shinkansen) on 18 March 2023 timetable revision as the line underwent an operating speed increase from 240 to 275 km/h (149 to 171 mph).

== Special train services ==
A special Joetsu Shinkansen 30th Anniversary (上越新幹線開業30周年号, Jōetsu Shinkansen Kaigyō 30-shūnen-gō) service ran as Toki 395 from Omiya to Niigata on 17 November 2012 using 10-car 200 series set K47.

== See also ==
- List of named passenger trains of Japan
