= E4 Series Shinkansen =

Japanese high speed train type

E4 series
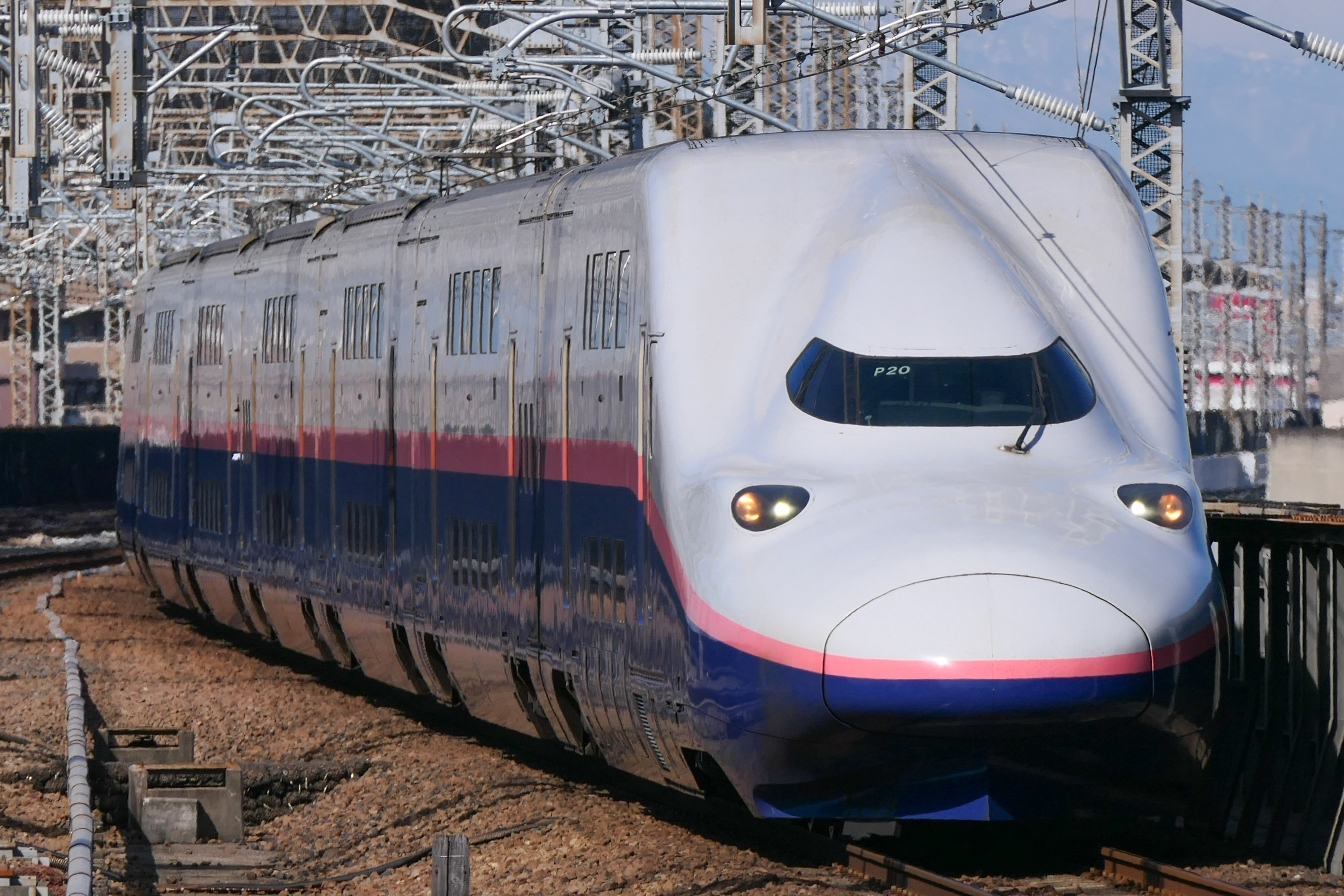
- E4 series train set P20 on a Joetsu Shinkansen Max Tanigawa service in February 2021
- In service: 20 December 1997 – 17 October 2021 (23 years, 301 days)
- Manufacturers: Hitachi, Kawasaki Heavy Industries
- Family name: Max
- Replaced: 200 series, E1 series
- Constructed: 1997–2003
- Entered service: December 1997
- Scrapped: 2013–2022
- Number built: 208 vehicles (26 sets)
- Number in service: None
- Number preserved: 1 vehicle
- Number scrapped: 207 vehicles (26 sets)
- Successor: E5 series, E7 series
- Formation: 8 cars per trainset
- Fleet numbers: P1–P22, P51–P52, P81–P82
- Capacity: 817 (54 Green + 763 standard)
- Operator: JR East
- Depots: Niigata, Sendai
- Lines served: Tōhoku Shinkansen (1997–2012); Jōetsu Shinkansen (2001–2021); Hokuriku Shinkansen (2001–2003)

Specifications
- Car body construction: Aluminium
- Train length: 151.4 m (497 ft)
- Car length: End cars: 25.7 m (84 ft), Intermediate cars: 25 m (82 ft)
- Width: 3.38 m (11.1 ft)
- Height: 4.485 m (14.7 ft)
- Doors: 2 per side, per car
- Maximum speed: 240 km/h (150 mph)
- Weight: 428 t (944,000 lb)
- Traction system: Mitsubishi IGBT-VVVF
- Traction motors: 16 × 420 kW (560 hp) AC
- Power output: 6,720 kW (9,010 hp)
- Acceleration: 1.65 km/(h⋅s) (1.03 mph/s)
- Deceleration: Service: 2.69 km/(h⋅s) (1.67 mph/s); Emergency: 4.04 km/(h⋅s) (2.51 mph/s)
- Electric systems: Overhead line: 25 kV 50 Hz AC; 25 kV 60 Hz AC (Sets P81/P82)
- Current collection: Pantograph
- UIC classification: 2′2′+Bo′Bo′+Bo′Bo′+2′2′+2′2′+Bo′Bo′+Bo′Bo′+2′2′
- Braking systems: Regenerative, pneumatic
- Safety systems: ATC-2, DS-ATC
- Multiple working: Up to two units, same type, 400 or E3 series
- Track gauge: 1,435 mm (4 ft 8 1/2 in) standard gauge

The E4 series (Japanese: E4系) was a Shinkansen high-speed train type operated by the East Japan Railway Company (JR East) in Japan from December 1997 until October 2021. It was the second double-deck Shinkansen train type, after the E1 series, and was marketed under the name Max (an acronym for Multi-Amenity eXpress). A total of 26 eight-car trainsets were built by Hitachi and Kawasaki Heavy Industries between 1997 and 2003. The type was withdrawn from regular service on 1 October 2021.

Like the E1 series, the E4 series was introduced to relieve overcrowding on services on the Tōhoku and Jōetsu Shinkansen, and it also saw occasional use on the Nagano Shinkansen (now known as the Hokuriku Shinkansen). The double-deck design was adopted to increase seating capacity for peak periods, with some cars using 3+3 seating. Although each trainset comprised only eight cars, two sets could be coupled together to provide 16-car formations with 1,634 seats, the highest-capacity high-speed train configuration in the world.

Unlike the steel carbodies of the E1 series, the E4 series used lightweight aluminium construction. However, the trainsets remained significantly heavier than single-deck designs, limiting the maximum operating speed to 240 kilometres per hour (150 mph). Double-deck Shinkansen trainsets subsequently fell out of use as lighter single-deck designs supported higher operating speeds—up to 320 kilometres per hour (200 mph) on newer types—shortening travel times and allowing increased service frequency.

== Operations ==
E4 series sets were used on the following services.

- Joetsu Shinkansen
  - Max Asahi (7 May 2001 – November 2002)
  - Max Tanigawa (7 May 2001 – 1 October 2021)
  - Max Toki (7 May 2001 – 1 October 2021)
- Tohoku Shinkansen
  - Max Nasuno (20 December 1997 – 28 September 2012)
  - Max Yamabiko (20 December 1997 – 28 September 2012)
- Hokuriku Shinkansen
  - Max Asama (22 July 2001 – 15 September 2003)

== Formation ==
Car No.	1	2	3	4	5	6	7	8
Designation	T1c	M1	M2	T	Tk	Mp	Ms	Tpsc
Numbering	E453-100	E455-100	E456-100	E458	E459-200	E455	E446	E444
Upper-level accommodation	Non-reserved (3+3)			Reserved (2+3)			Green (2+2)	
Lower-level accommodation	Reserved (2+3)							
Total seating capacity	75	133	119	124	110	122	91	43

Cars 4 and 6 were equipped with a PS201 pantograph.

== Interior ==
Outside and inside an E4 Series Shinkansen shortly before it was retired

The upper decks of cars 1 to 3 had non-reserved seating with fixed, non-reclining bench seats arranged 3+3 without individual armrests. The E4 series and E1 Max series were the only Shinkansen trains to use 3+3 seating. The upper decks of cars 7 and 8 contained the Green car, with 2+2 seating. All other passenger areas had reserved ordinary-class seating arranged 2+3. The trains had a total capacity of 817 passengers.

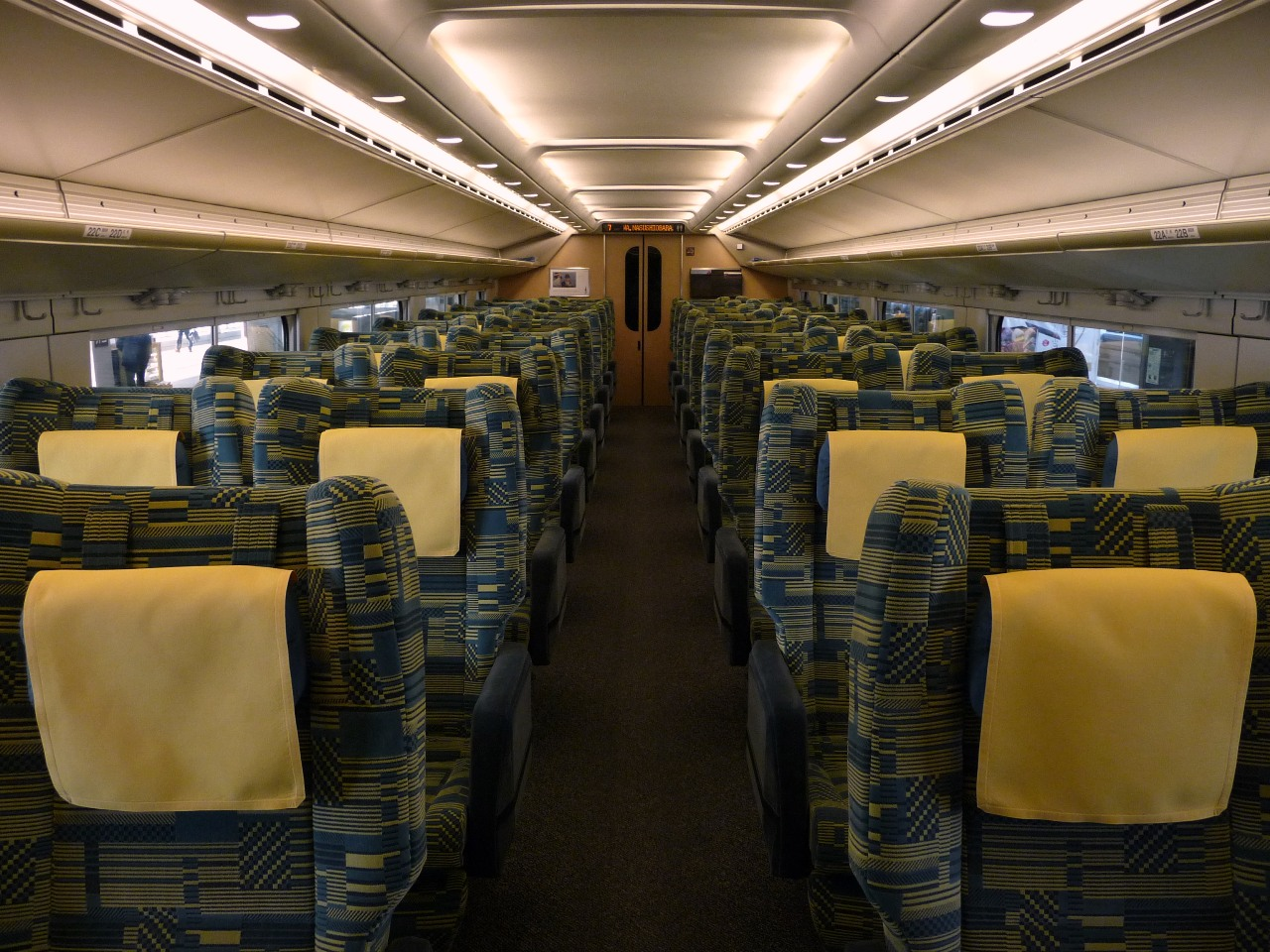
Green class saloon (upper deck), February 2011

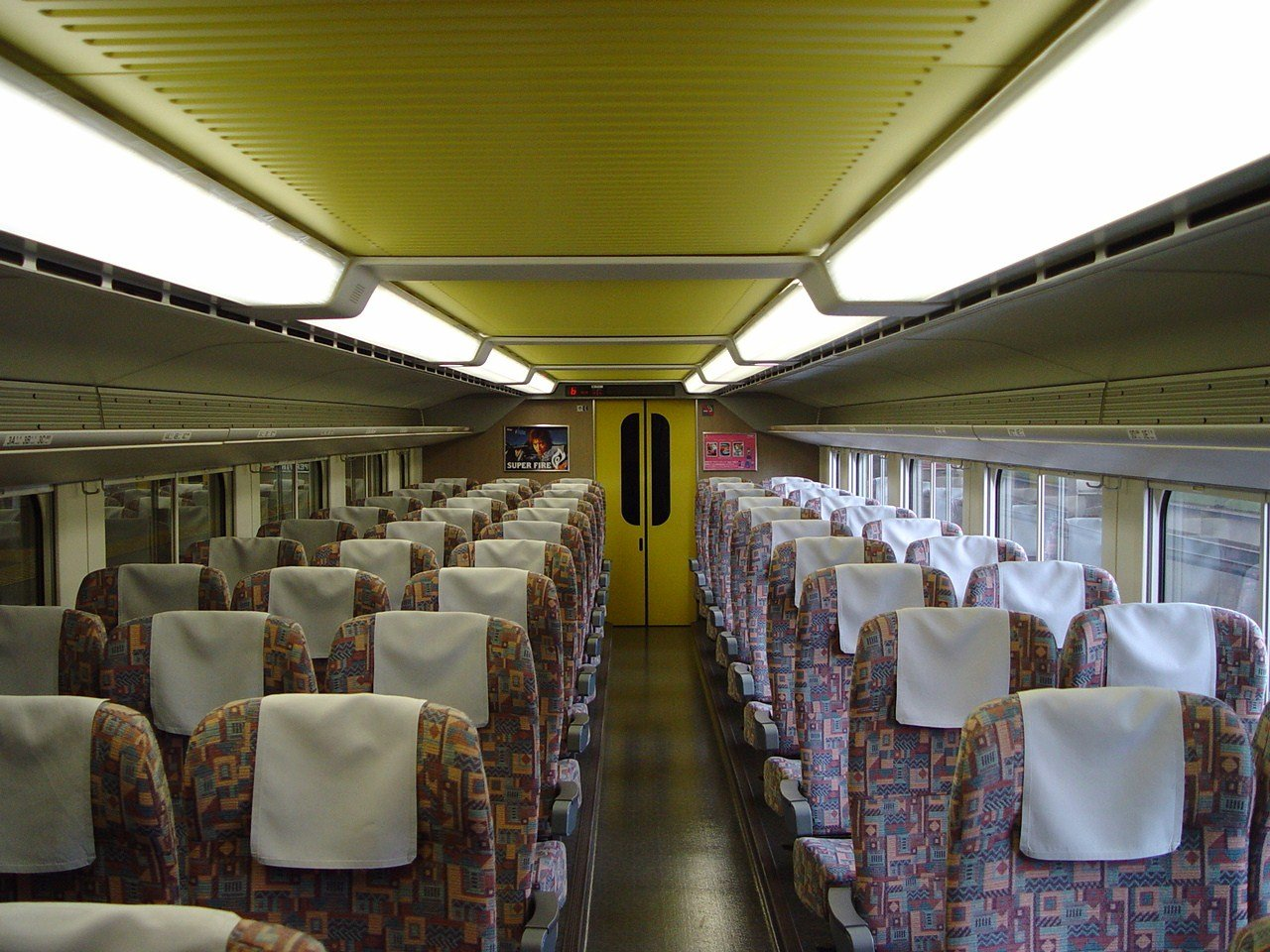
Standard-class reserved car lower deck with 2+3 seating

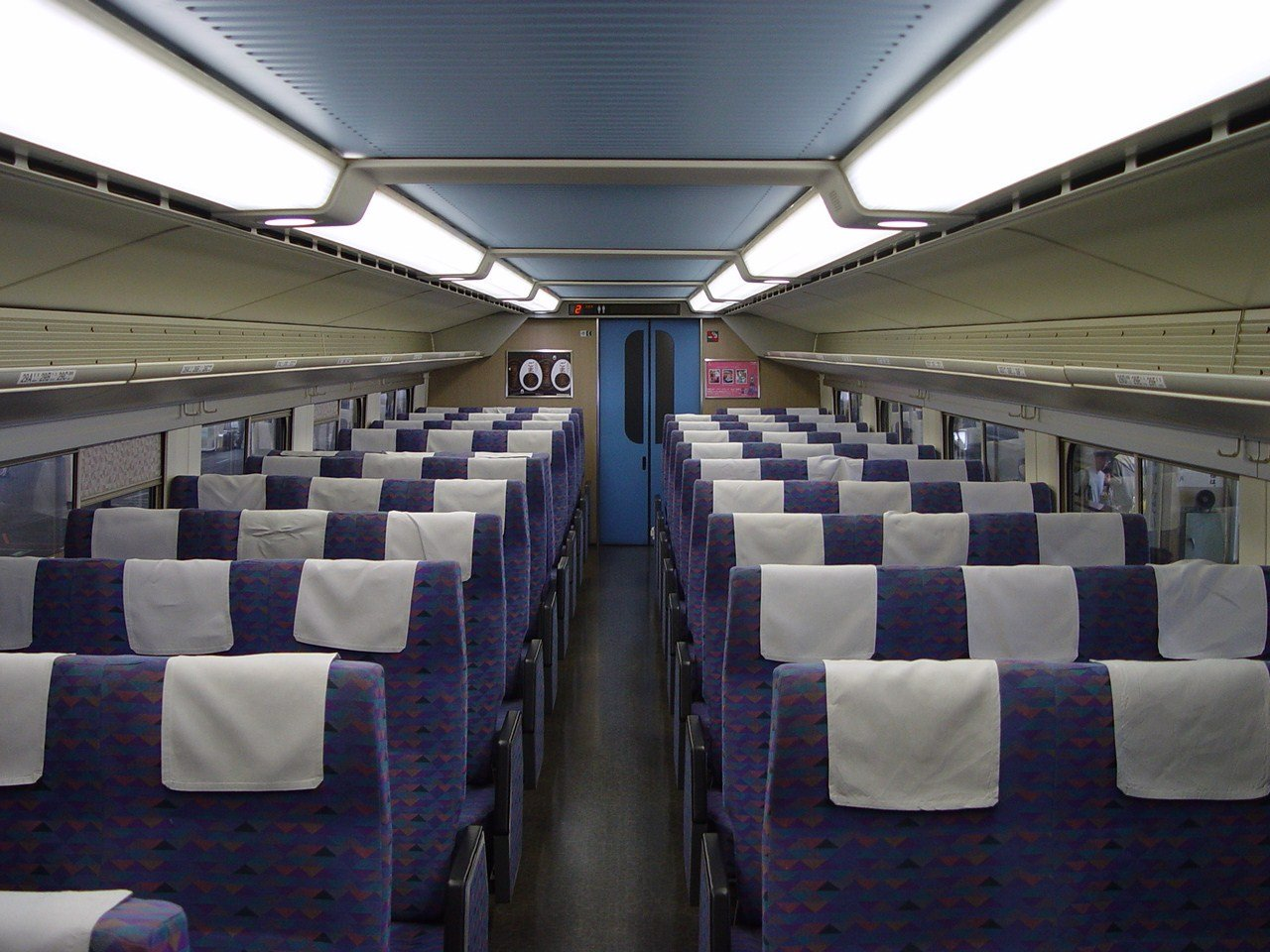
Standard-class non-reserved car upper deck with non-reclining 3+3 seating

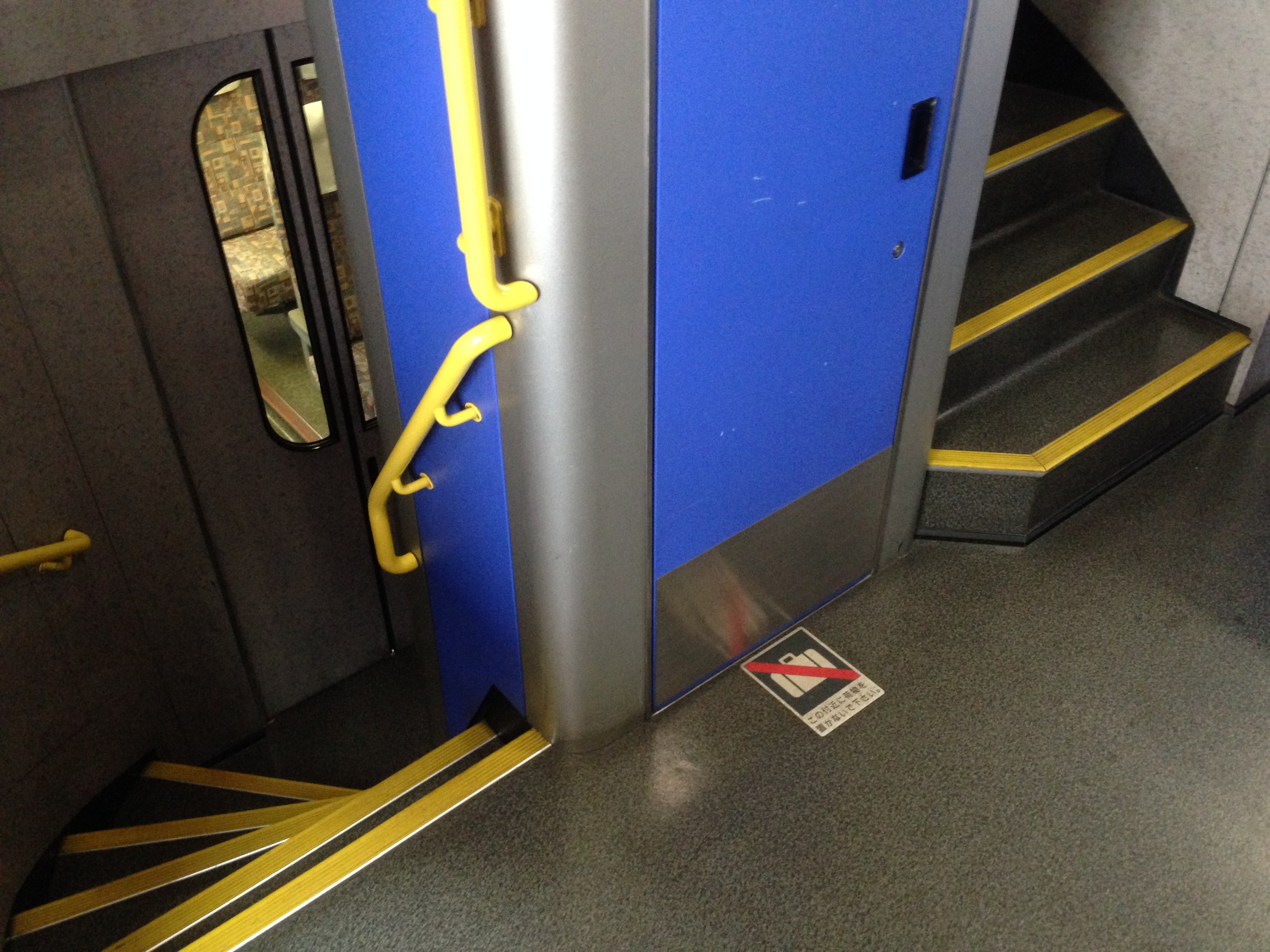
Vestibule area and stairway

== History ==
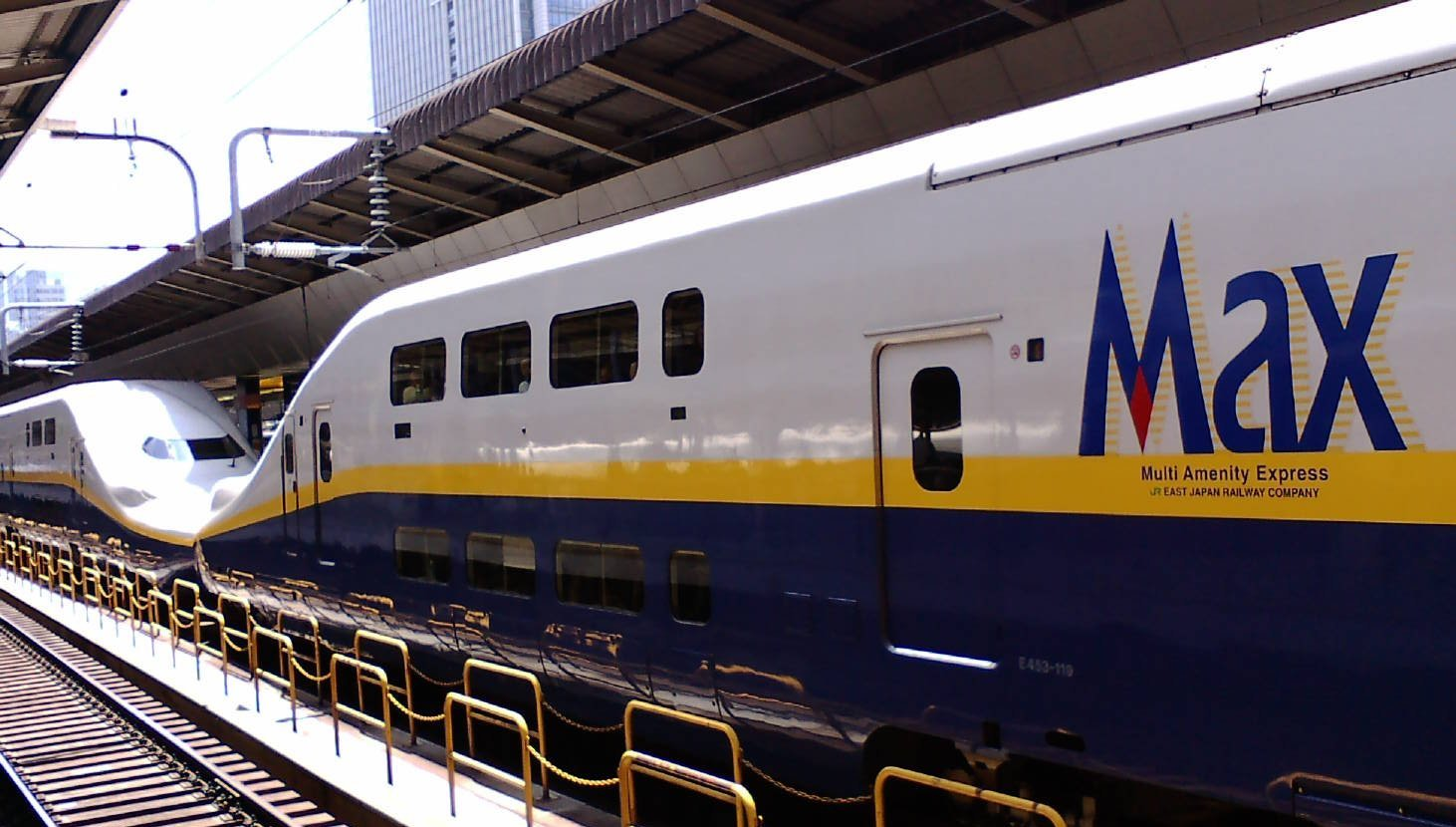
Two E4 sets at Tokyo station in their original livery, August 2008

The first E4 series set, P1, was delivered to Sendai Depot on 8 October 1997, with the first sets entering revenue-earning service on the Tohoku Shinkansen from 20 December 1997.

All cars were made no-smoking from the start of the revised timetable on 18 March 2007.

In March 2011, it was announced that the entire E4 series fleet would be withdrawn by around 2016.

In September 2012, E4 series were entirely withdrawn from Tohoku Shinkansen services, and all allocated for use on Joetsu Shinkansen services only. The trains were withdrawn from regular service on 1 October 2021, and were completely retired on 17 October of the same year.

From 2014, the fleet of 24 sets still in service began to be repainted, receiving a new livery identical to that of the E1 series trains, with a toki (crested ibis) pink stripe separating the white on the upper body and blue on the lower body. The first reliveried set, P5, was returned to service in early April 2014, with the entire fleet be treated by the end of fiscal 2015.

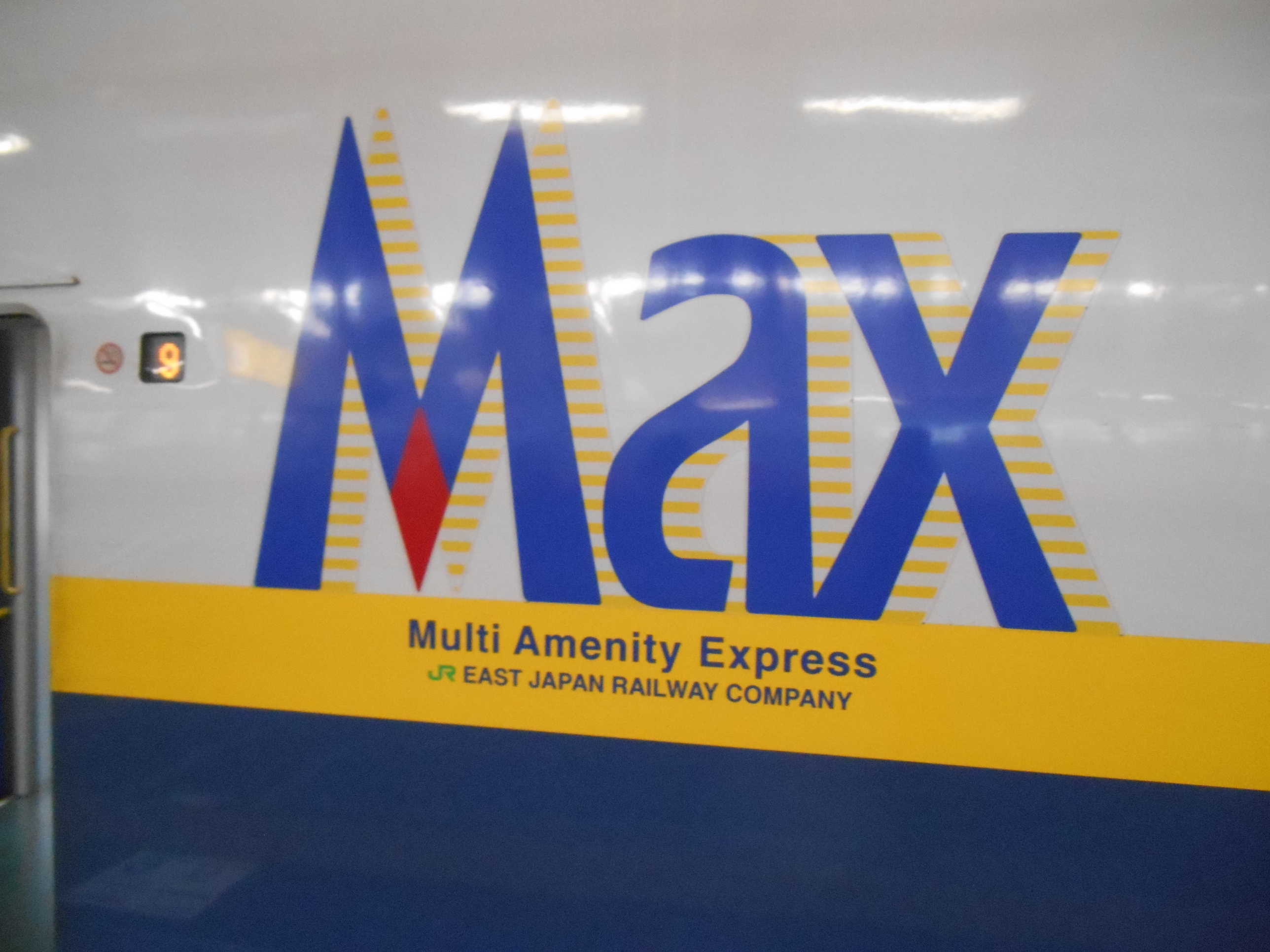
Original "Max" logo in May 2014 prior to refurbishment

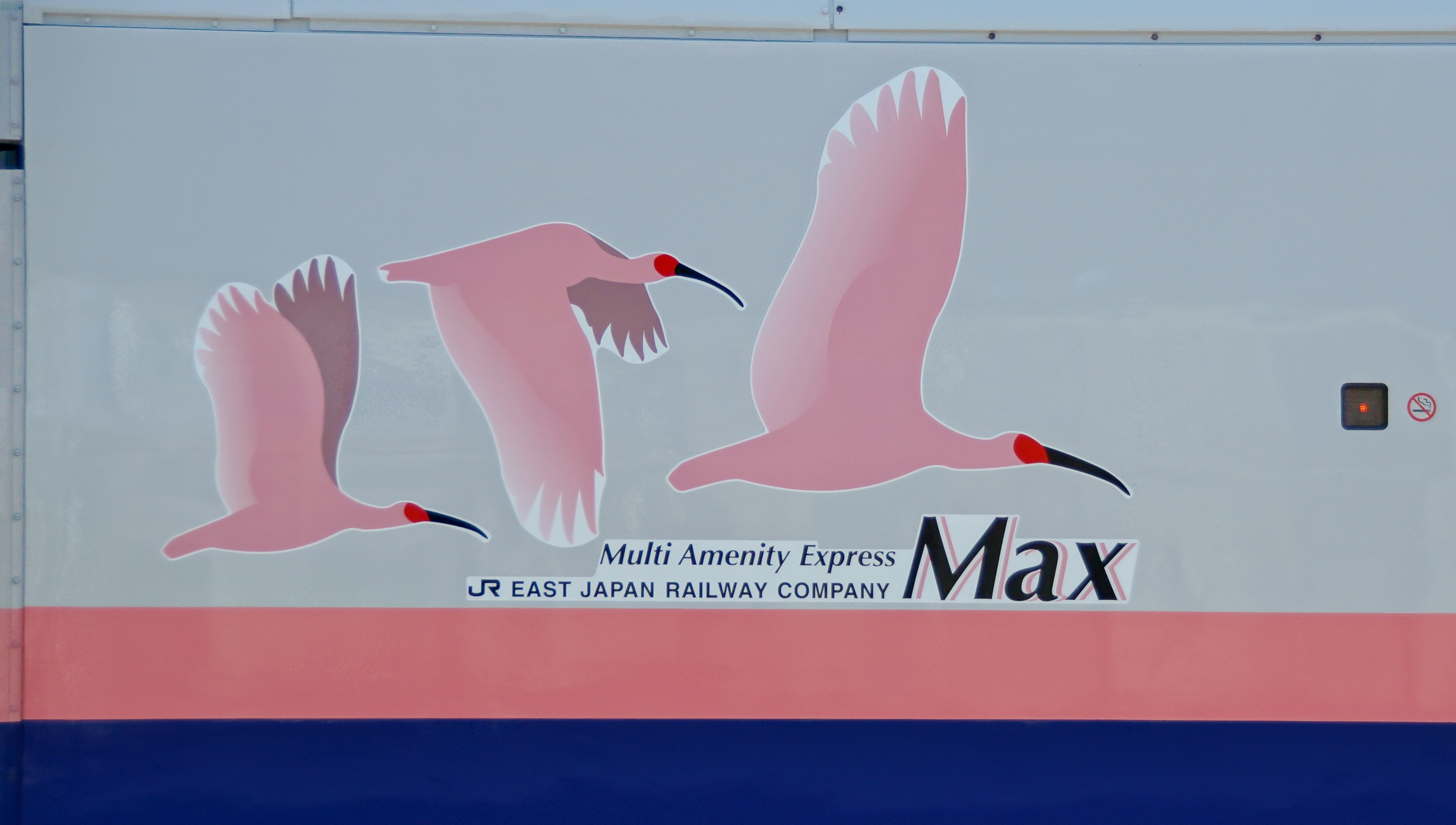
"Max" logo on a refurbished set in April 2014

== Fleet list ==
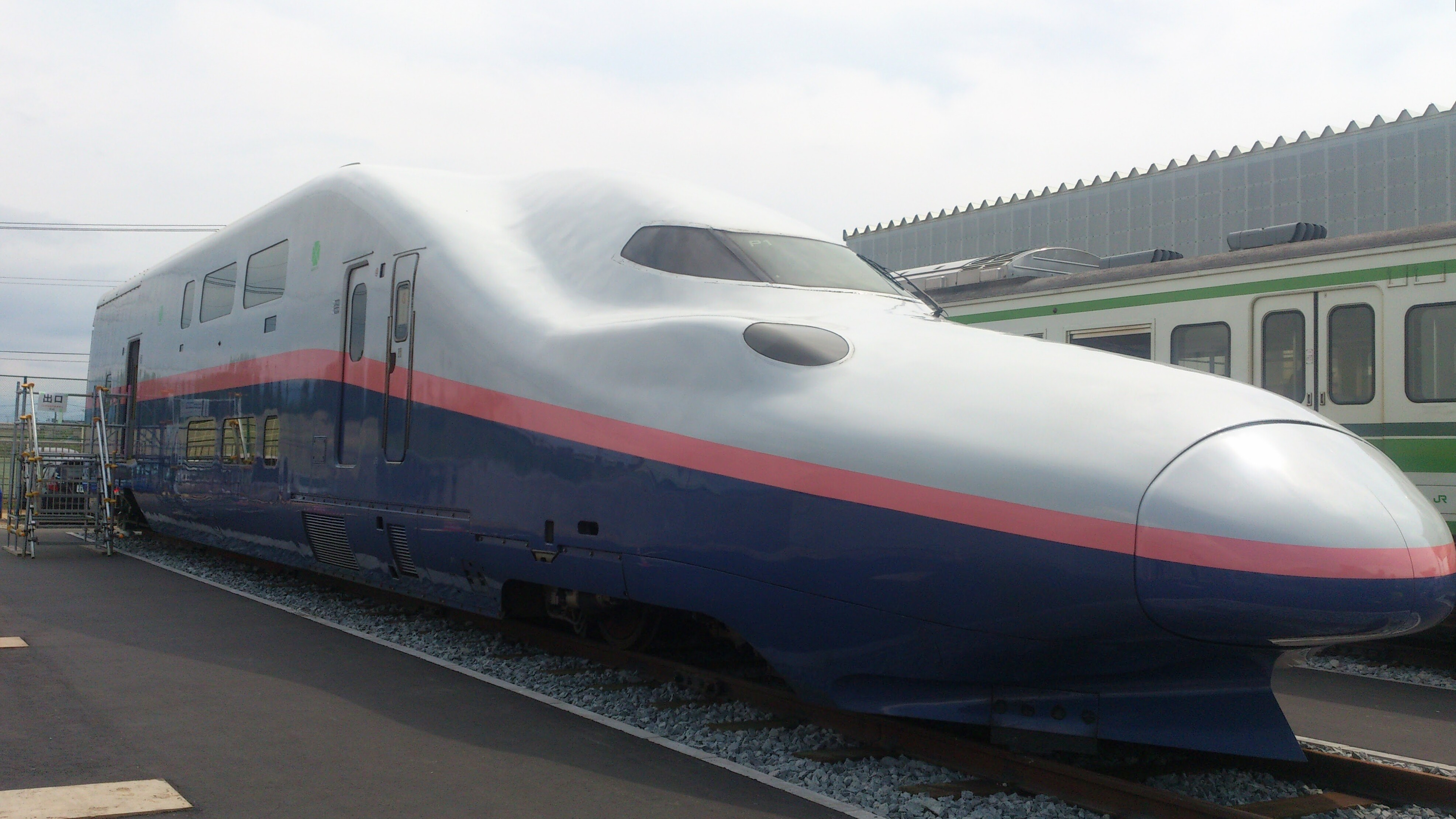
Preserved car E444-1 in July 2017

A total of 26 eight-car trainsets were built by Hitachi and Kawasaki Heavy Industries between 1997 and 2003.

Sets P51 and P52 were designed for operation on the steep gradients of the Nagano Shinkansen for services to Karuizawa Station. Sets P81 and P82 were also designed for the Nagano Shinkansen and were equipped to operate under both 50 Hz and 60 Hz overhead power supplies for services to Nagano Station.

Withdrawals began in July 2013 with sets P2 and P3. A ceremonial "last-run" service ran on 1 October 2021, with the final set formally withdrawn on 30 March 2022.

End car E444-1 from set P1 is displayed at the Niigata City Niitsu Railway Museum in Niitsu, Niigata. It was transported by road from Niigata Depot to the museum in the early hours of 20 June 2017.

Build details are as shown below:

Set	Manufacturer	Delivered	Repainted	Withdrawn
P1	Kawasaki	8 October 1997	12 May 2015	2 April 2016
P2	Hitachi	20 October 1997	—N/a	3 July 2013
P3	Kawasaki	27 October 1997	—N/a	26 July 2013
P4	Hitachi	10 February 1999	10 February 2016	15 September 2017
P5	Kawasaki	22 February 1999	3 April 2014	5 December 2017
P6	Hitachi	15 March 1999	11 June 2014	13 January 2018
P7	Hitachi	14 April 1999	25 March 2015	29 May 2019
P8	Kawasaki	31 May 1999	3 July 2015	20 June 2019
P9	Hitachi	21 June 1999	20 August 2015	12 July 2019
P10	Kawasaki	12 July 1999	4 February 2015	7 May 2019
P11	Hitachi	26 July 2000	3 March 2016	28 October 2021
P12	Hitachi	28 August 2000	13 April 2016	24 November 2021
P13	Kawasaki	11 September 2000	10 May 2016	20 December 2021
P14	Hitachi	13 October 2000	1 June 2016	18 January 2022
P15	Kawasaki	16 October 2000	17 October 2016	17 December 2019
P16	Hitachi	27 November 2000	1 May 2014	24 August 2020
P17	Hitachi	21 March 2001	30 September 2014	14 February 2022
P18	Kawasaki	4 June 2001	30 April 2015	22 February 2021
P19	Kawasaki	25 June 2001	20 August 2015	18 March 2021
P20	Hitachi	16 July 2001	9 October 2015	26 April 2021
P21	Kawasaki	9 October 2001	4 November 2015	27 May 2021
P22	Kawasaki	20 November 2001	18 December 2015	21 June 2021
P51	Kawasaki	31 January 2001	7 July 2014	25 November 2020
P52	Kawasaki	20 February 2001	27 August 2014	5 October 2021
P81	Hitachi	30 July 2003	22 July 2015	7 May 2021
P82	Kawasaki	20 November 2003	19 January 2016	30 March 2022

== See also ==
- TGV Duplex, French double-deck high speed train
- List of high-speed trains
