= 200 Series Shinkansen =

Japanese high speed train type

200 series
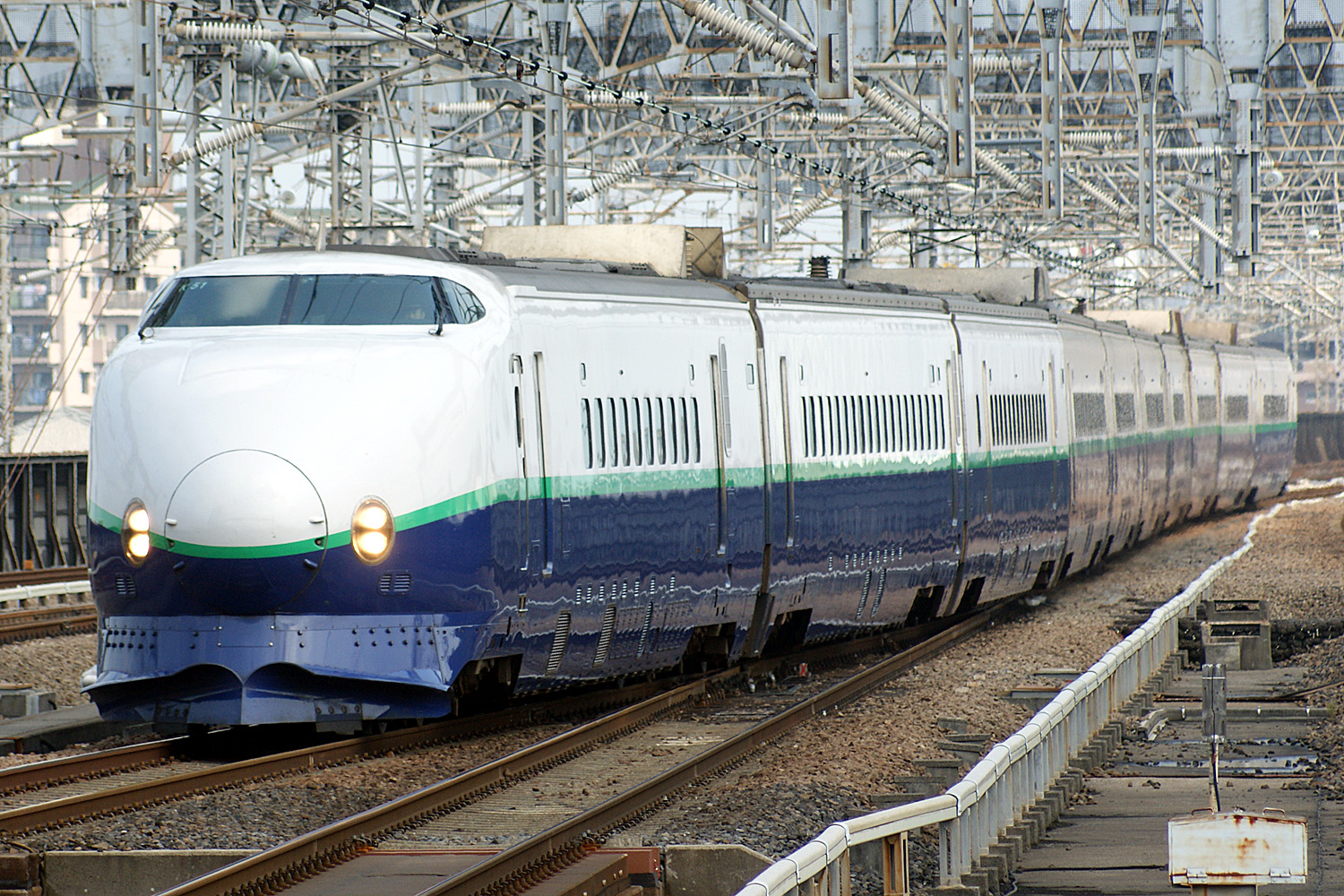
- Refurbished 200 series train near Ōmiya Station, July 2008
- In service: 23 June 1982 – 14 April 2013 (30 years, 295 days)
- Manufacturers: Hitachi; Kawasaki Heavy Industries; Kinki Sharyo; Nippon Sharyo; Tokyu Car
- Constructed: 1980–1991
- Entered service: 23 June 1982
- Refurbished: 1999–2002 (K sets)
- Scrapped: 1997–2013
- Number built: 700 vehicles (66 sets)
- Number in service: None
- Number preserved: 4 vehicles
- Number scrapped: 695 vehicles
- Successor: E1, E2, E4, and E5 series
- Formation: 8, 10, 12, 13 or 16 cars per set
- Operators: JNR (1982–1987); JR East (1987–2013)
- Depots: Niigata, Sendai
- Lines served: Tōhoku Shinkansen (1982-2011); Jōetsu Shinkansen (1982-2013); Nagano Shinkansen (February 1998 only)

Specifications
- Car body construction: Aluminium
- Car length: 25 m (82 ft)
- Width: 3.385 m (11 ft 1 in)
- Height: 4.41 m (14 ft 6 in)
- Doors: Two per side, per car
- Maximum speed: E/G sets: 210 km/h (130 mph); F/K sets: 240 km/h (150 mph); H sets: 245 km/h (152 mph); Sets F90–93: 275 km/h (171 mph)
- Traction system: Thyristor drive
- Electric systems: Overhead line: 25 kV 50 Hz AC; 25 kV 60 Hz AC (Set F80)
- Current collection: Pantograph
- Safety systems: ATC-2, DS-ATC
- Multiple working: Up to two units: 400 or E3 series
- Track gauge: 1,435 mm (4 ft 8 1/2 in) standard gauge

The 200 series (Japanese: 200系) was a Shinkansen high-speed train type introduced by Japanese National Railways (JNR) in June 1982 for use on the newly opened Tōhoku and Jōetsu Shinkansen lines, the first Shinkansen routes built east of Tokyo. Externally, the design was derived from the original 0 series, but were lighter and more powerful to handle the steeper gradients and mountainous terrain on these lines, and incorporated features for winter operation. A total of 700 vehicles, arranged into 66 sets, were built between 1980 and 1991 by Hitachi, Kawasaki, Kinki Sharyo, Nippon Sharyo, and the Tokyu Car Corporation.

The 200 series predated the 100 series; under JNR's numbering scheme, Shinkansen types operating east of Tokyo were assigned even-numbered designations, while those to the west received odd numbers. Following JNR's privatization in 1987, the trains were transferred to the East Japan Railway Company (JR East), and many sets were refurbished during their service lives before being withdrawn from service in 2013.

== Design ==
The 200 Series Shinkansen trains resembled the earlier 0 series trains in styling (some later units had the pointed 'shark nose' of the 100 series), but were lighter and more powerful, since the Tōhoku and Jōetsu Shinkansen lines are mountain routes and have steeper gradients. These lines are also prone to snowfall and the trains had small snowplows fitted, as well as protection of equipment against snow.

It was one of the two recipients of the 23rd Laurel Prize presented by the Japan Railfan Club, the first Shinkansen type to receive that award.

They were originally painted in ivory with a green window band and lower bodyside band, but a number of sets were refurbished and painted into a white-upper/dark blue-lower scheme with new wrap-around cab windows from 1999.

The first units were capable of 210 km/h (130 mph) but later ones can do 240 km/h (149 mph), and four were converted to be capable of 275 km/h (171 mph). Some units were also modified with retractable couplers in the nose for coupling with Yamagata Shinkansen Tsubasa and Akita Shinkansen Komachi Mini-shinkansen sets. In addition, some of the later 200 series Shinkansen trains were fitted with double-deck cars, which had semi-open standard-class compartments on the lower deck and green class (first class) seating on the upper deck. These too have been removed from service.

Withdrawal of the earlier units began in 1997, and the last remaining unrefurbished set was withdrawn in May 2007.

== Variants ==
Since their introduction in 1982, the 200 series sets have been operated in a number of different formations as described below.

=== E sets (1982–1993) ===
12-car sets for Tōhoku Shinkansen Yamabiko and Aoba services, and for Jōetsu Shinkansen Asahi and Toki services. These had a maximum speed of 210 km/h (130 mph), and remained in service until early 1993.

The 12-car E sets were formed as follows.

Car No.	1	2	3	4	5	6	7	8	9	10	11	12
Designation	Mc	M'	M	M'	Mk	M'	Ms	M'	MB	M'	M	M'c
Numbering	221	226	225	226	225-400	226	215	226	237	226	225	222

=== F sets (1983–2007) ===
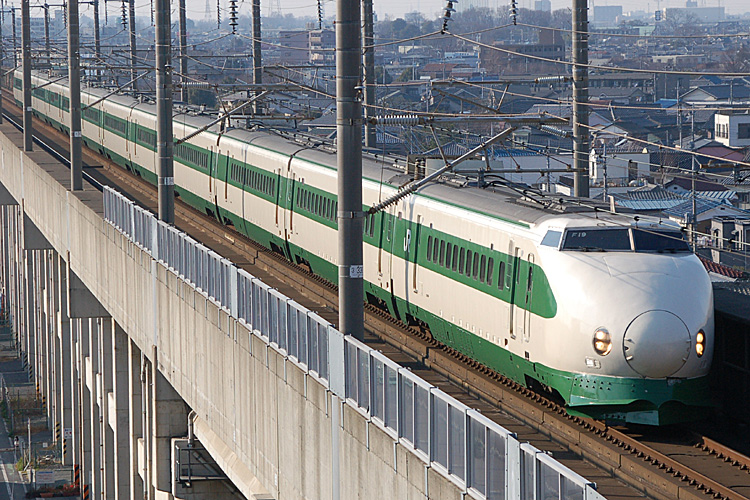
12-car set F19, March 2006

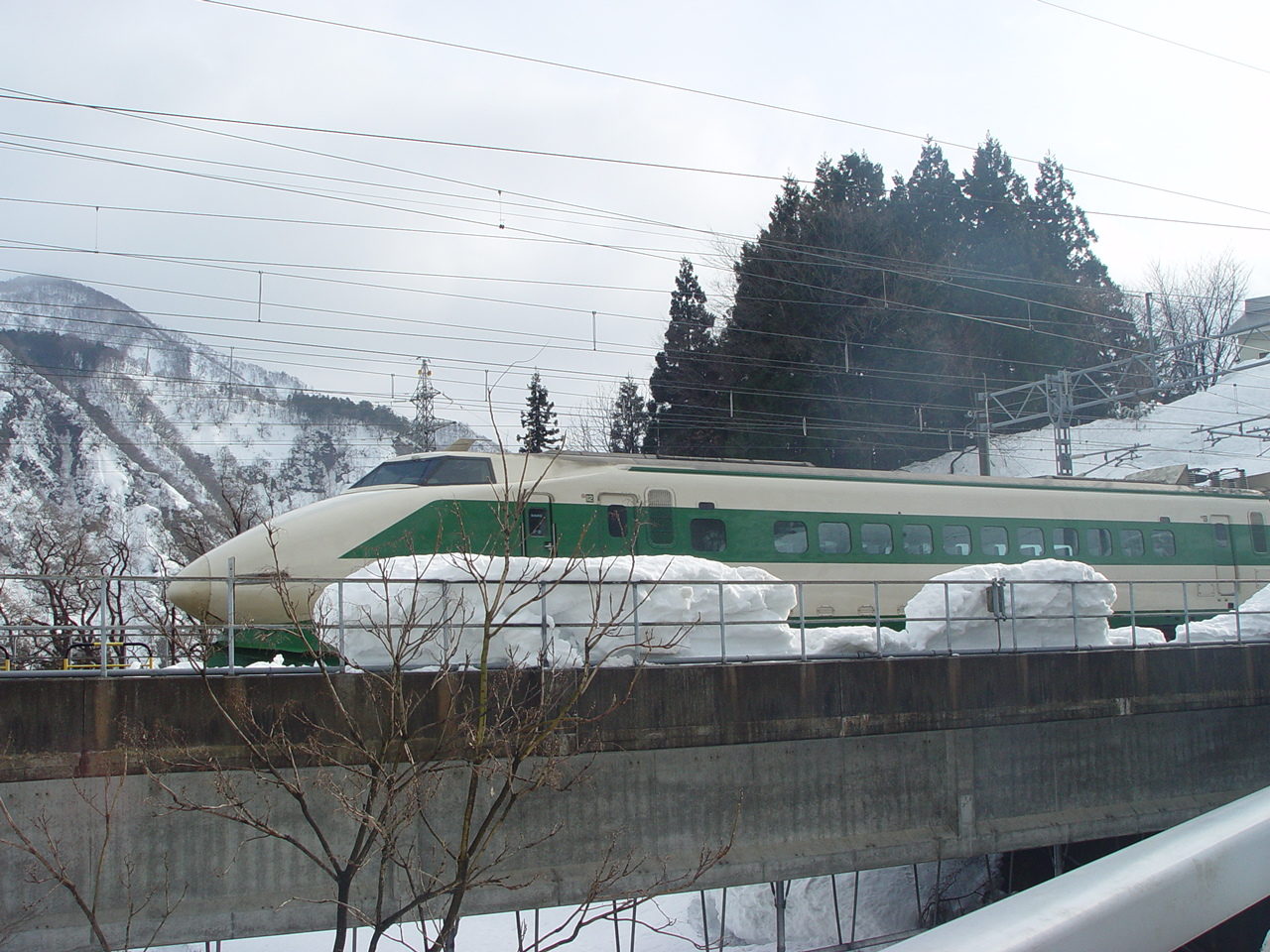
12-car set F8 on Gala-Yuzawa Line with pointed nose, January 2006

12-car 200-1000 series sets with a maximum speed of 240 km/h (149 mph) which were introduced in November 1983.

From March 1990, four selected 12-car F sets (F90–F93, formerly F54, F59, F14, F16) were upgraded allowing them to run at a maximum of 275 km/h (171 mph) on a small number of down Asahi services. 275 km/h (171 mph) services were discontinued on the Jōetsu Shinkansen from 1998, with the introduction of E2 series trains, and the F90 sets were subsequently used interchangeably with other 240 km/h (149 mph) F sets.

Some F sets are similar to the H sets in that the driving trailer cars were built with a pointed nose, just like the latter. These trains however, feature a solid green line unlike the H sets, where they have two green lines, one thick and one thin, separated by a thin white section near the bottom.

==== Formations ====
The 12-car F sets were formed as follows, with car 1 at the Tokyo end. Car 11 was a Green (first class) car, and car 9 had a buffet counter.

Car No.	1	2	3	4	5	6	7	8	9	10	11	12
Designation	Mc	M'	M	M'	Mk	M'	M	M'	MB	M'	MS	M'c
Numbering	221	226	225	226	225-400	226	225	226	237	226	215	222

Cars 2, 4, 10, and 12 were each fitted with one cross-arm pantograph. (3, 5, 7, and 9 for sets F90-93)

==== Interior ====
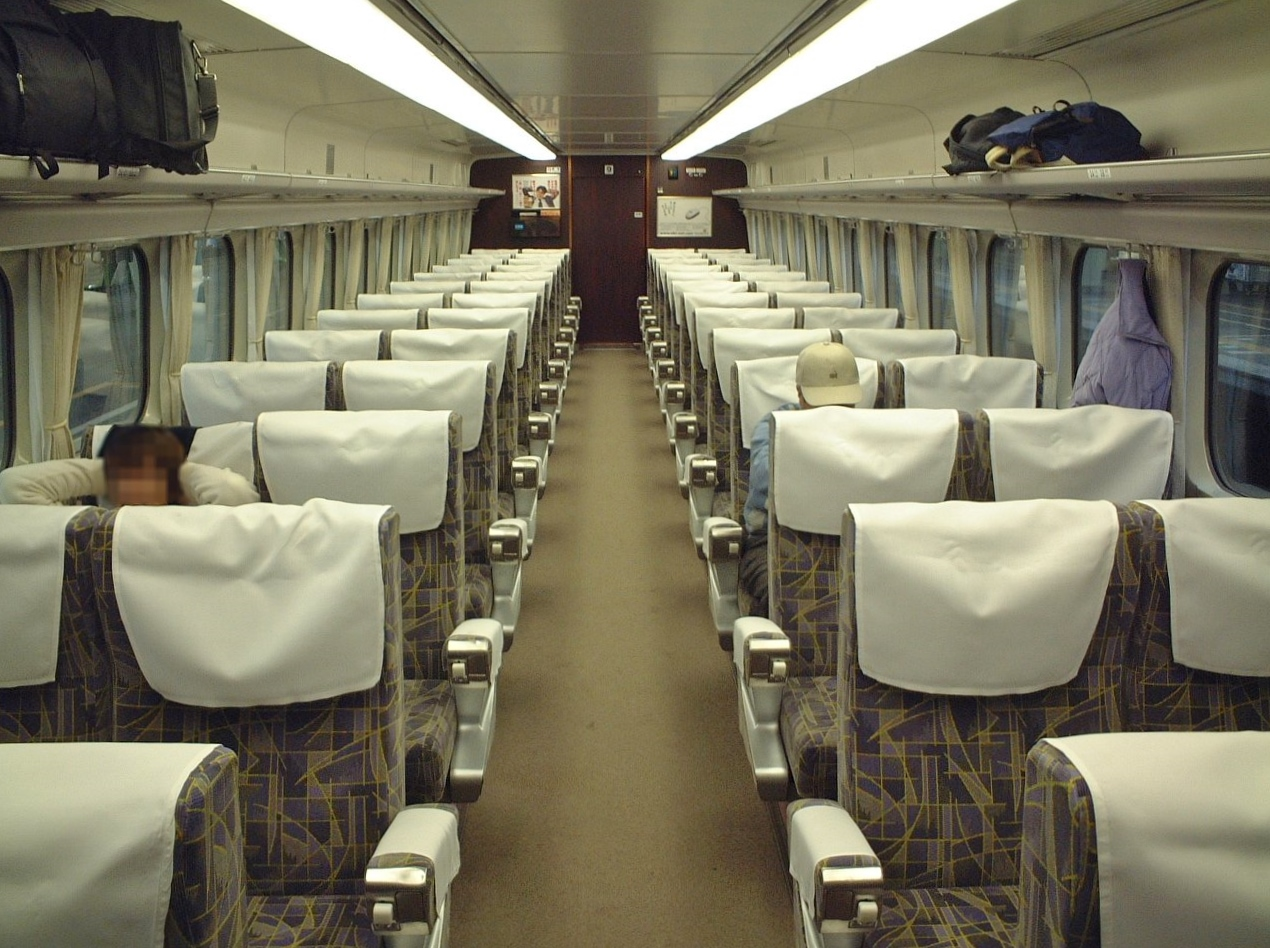
Green car, January 2002

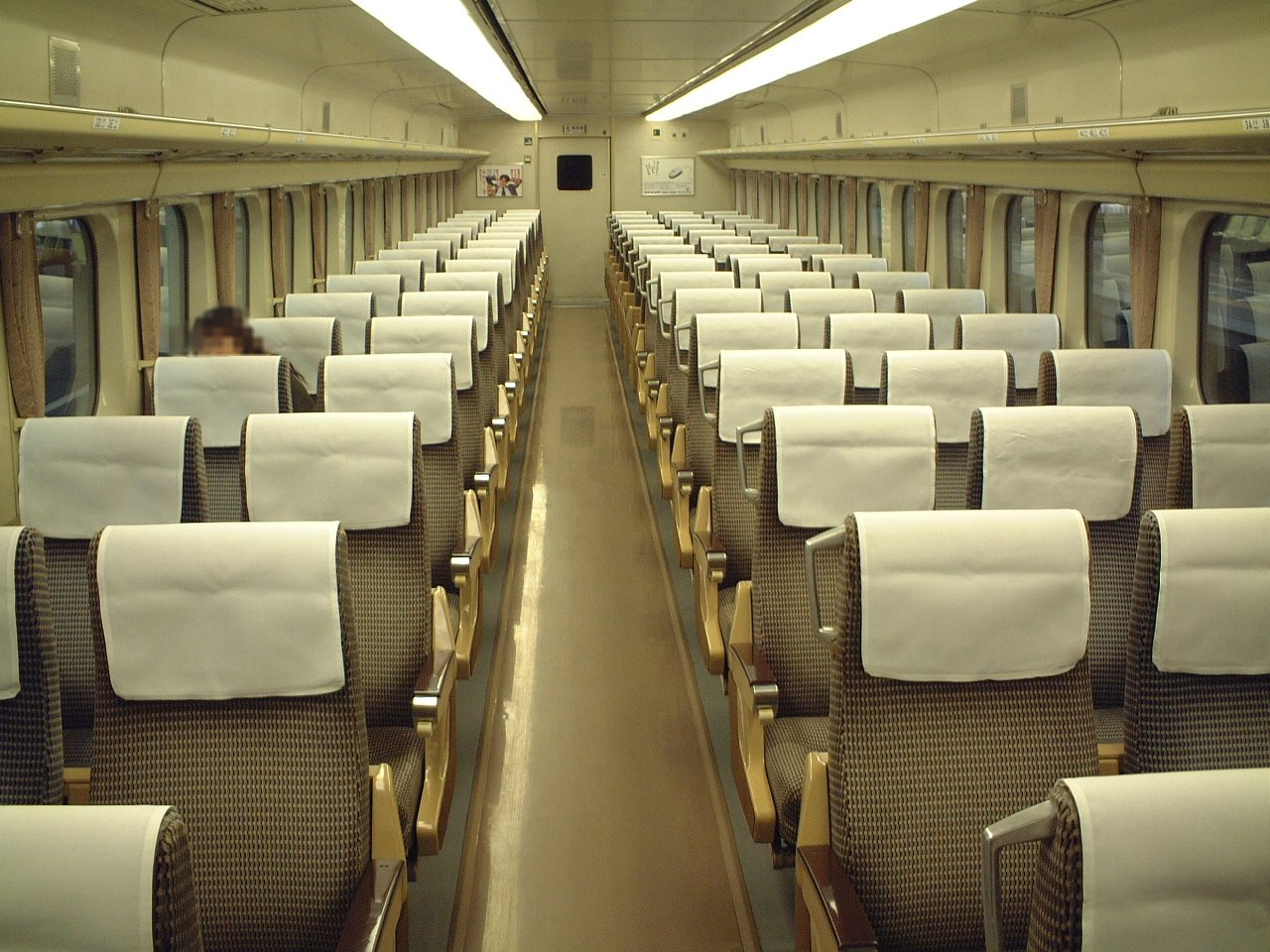
Standard-class car with fixed 3-abreast seating rows, January 2002

==== Set F80 ====
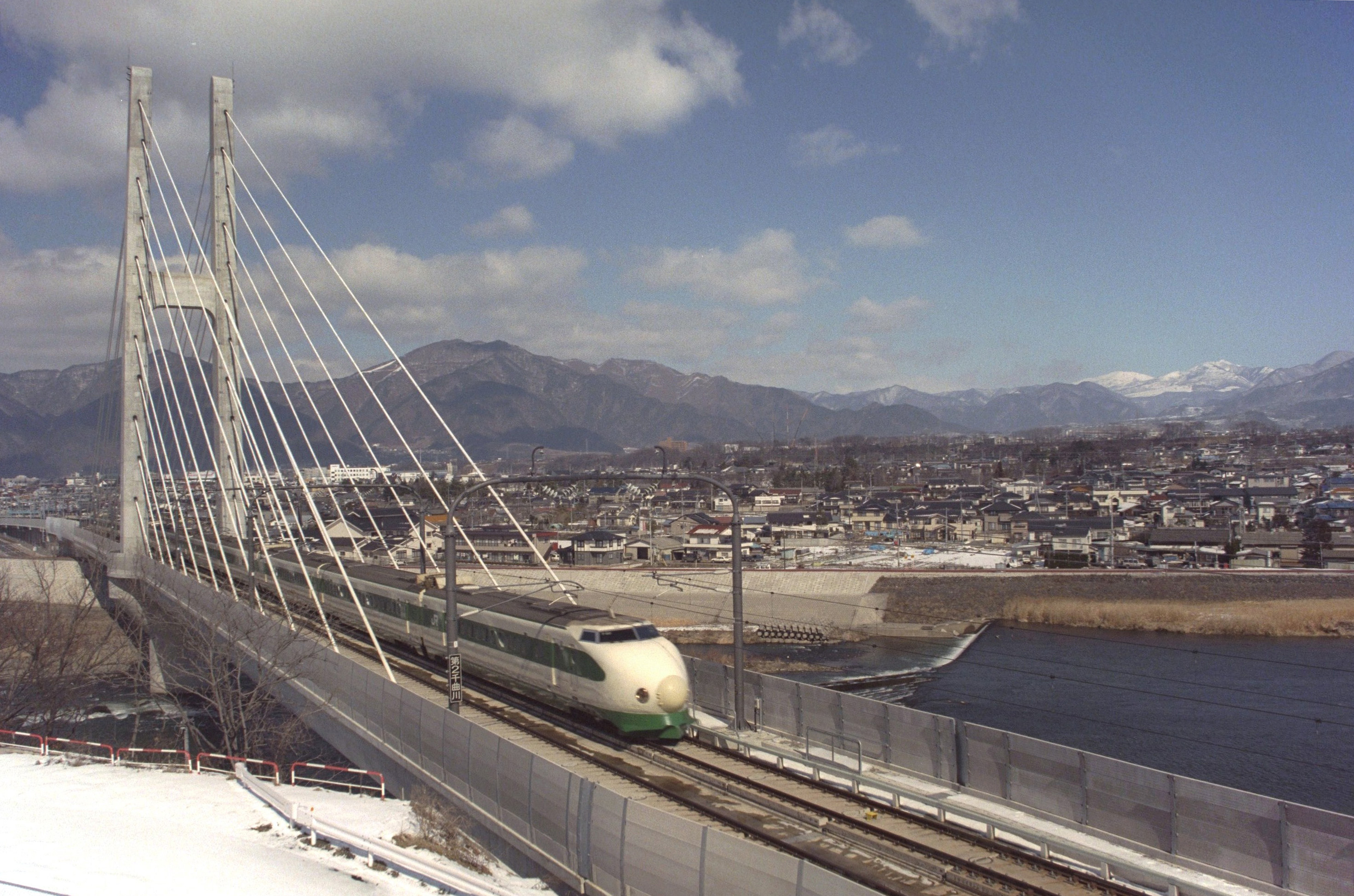
Modified set F80 on a Nagano Shinkansen Asama service, February 1998

One F set, F17, was specially modified at Sendai Depot between August 1997 and January 1998 for use on additional Nagano Shinkansen Asama services in February 1998 during the 1998 Winter Olympics held in Nagano. The train was renumbered F80, and modifications included ability to operate on both 25 kV AC 50 Hz and 60 Hz overhead power supplies, weight-saving measures to comply with the 16 tonne axle load restriction, and additional control equipment to cope with the 30‰ gradient of the Nagano Shinkansen. Maximum speed was limited to 210 km/h (130 mph) when operating on the Nagano Shinkansen.

Seats in the end cars, cars 1 and 12, were replaced with E2 series-style seats to reduce weight.

The train was formed as follows, with car 1 at the Tokyo end. Car 11 was a Green (first class) car, and car 9 had a buffet counter.

Car No.	1	2	3	4	5	6	7	8	9	10	11	12
Designation	Mc	M'	M	M'	Mk	M'	M	M'	MB	M'	MS	M'c
Numbering	221-1514	226-1081	225-1033	226-1082	225-1417	226-1083	225-1034	226-1084	237-1017	226-1085	215-1017	222-1514

Cars 2, 4, 8, and 10 were each fitted with one cross-arm pantograph.

After February 1998, set F80 was used interchangeably with other F sets, and remained in operation until 2004.

=== G sets (1987–1999) ===
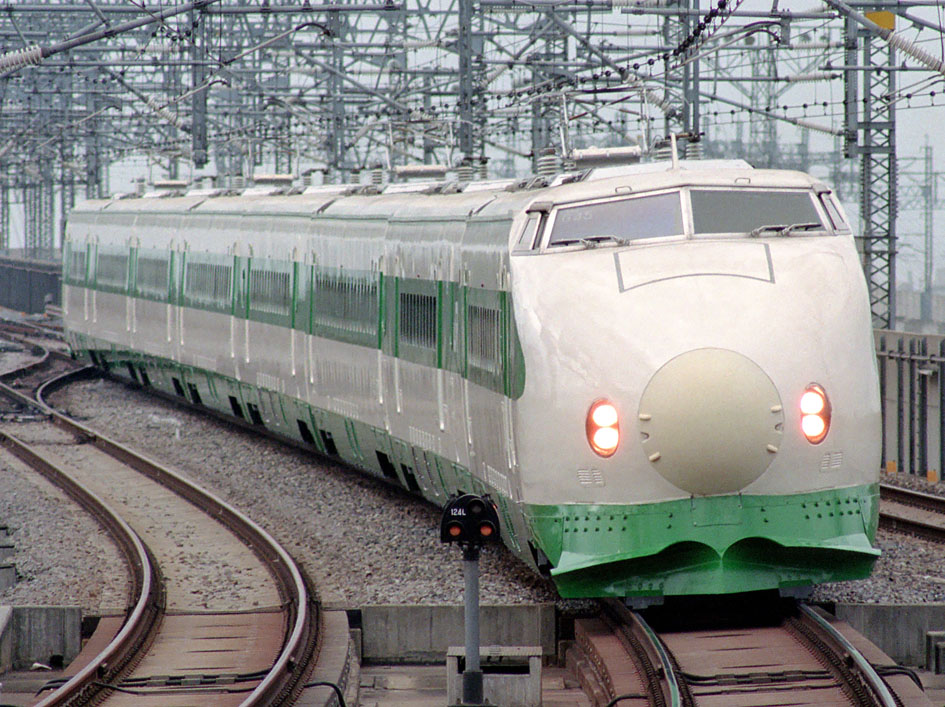
8-car set G45 at Omiya, circa 1990

10-car, and later 8-car, sets formed from the earlier 12-car E sets, with a maximum speed of 210 km/h (130 mph). These entered service from 18 April 1987.

==== Formations ====
The initial 10-car G sets were formed as follows.

Car No.	1	2	5	6	7	8	9	10	11	12
Designation	Mc	M'	M4	M'	Ms	M'	MB	M'	M	M'c
Numbering	221	226	225-400	226	215	226	237	226	225	222

The 8-car G sets were formed as follows.

Car No.	1	2	3	4	5	6	7	8
Designation	Mc	M'	M4	M'	Mhs	M'	MB	M'c
Numbering	221	226	225-400	226	215-300	226	237	222

Cars 2, 4, 6, and 8 were equipped with cross-arm pantographs. Some sets had an "Mpk" car (numbered 225-400) in place of the 237 buffet car for car 11.

=== H sets (1990–2005) ===
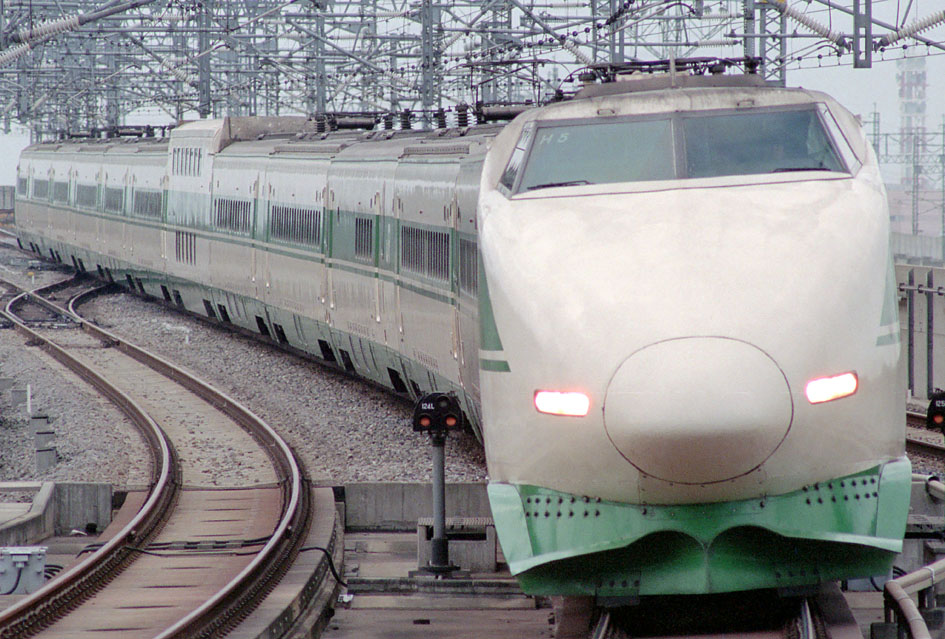
13-car set H5, circa 1990

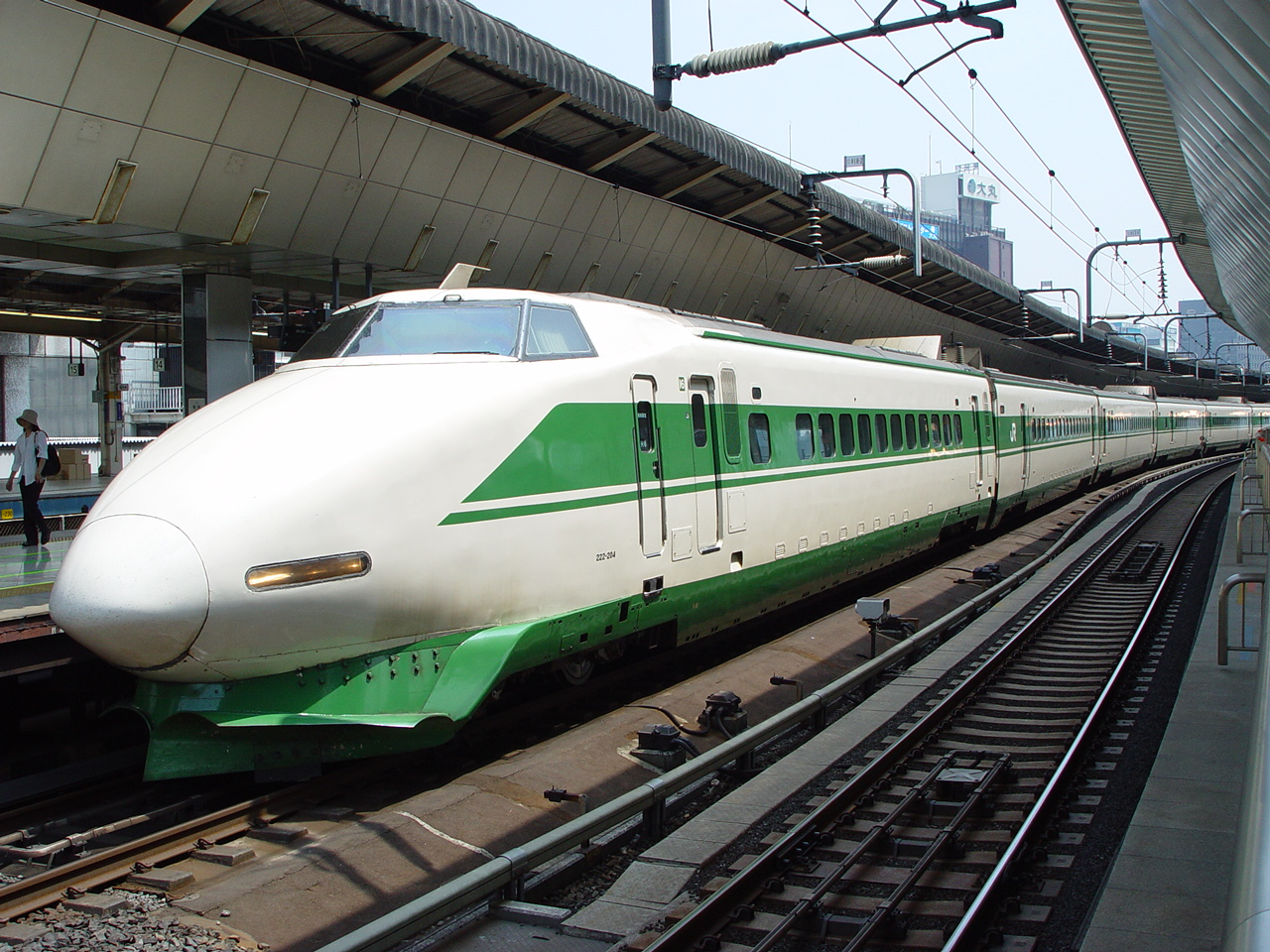
16-car set H6 at Tokyo Station, June 2002

Six 13-car and later 16-car sets (H1–H6) were formed with a maximum speed of 240 km/h for use on the Yamabiko (nicknamed Super Yamabiko) services, incorporating two bi-level Green cars (cars 9 and 10). These sets entered service from 23 June 1990.

Regular operations using 16-car H sets ended from the start of the revised timetable on 13 March 2004, but sets H4 and H5 were reinstated as 12-car sets from the middle of 2004 for seasonal use with their Green cars removed. These two sets remained in service until mid-2005.

==== Formations ====
The initial 13-car H sets were formed as follows.

Car No.	1	2	3	4	5	6	7	8	9	10	11	12	13
Designation	Mc	M'	M	M'	Mk	M'	TsD	Ms	M'	MB	M'	M	M'c
Numbering	221	226	225	226	225-400	226	249	215	226	237	226	225	222

The 16-car H sets were formed as follows.

Car No.	1	2	3	4	5	6	7	8	9	10	11	12	13	14	15	16
Designation	Mc	M'	M	M'	M	M'	Mk	M'	T'sD	TsD	MCON	M'	M	M'	M	M'c
Numbering	221-200	226-100	225	226-100	225	226	225-400	226-100	249	248	225-100	226-100	225-200	226-100	225	222-200
Seating capacity	50	95	80	95	80	95	70	95	67	40	70	95	68	95	80	55

Cars 2, 4, 8, 12, and 14 were each fitted with one cross-arm pantograph.

The 12-car H sets (H4 & H5) were formed as follows.

Car No.	1	2	3	4	5	6	7	8	9	10	11	12
Designation	Mc	M'	M	M'	Mk	M'	M	M'	M	M'	Mcon	M'c
Numbering	221-200	226-100	225	226-100	225-400	226-100	225	226-100	225-200	226-100	225-100	222-200

Cars 2, 4, 6, 8, and 10 were each fitted with one cross-arm pantograph.

=== K sets (1992–2013) ===
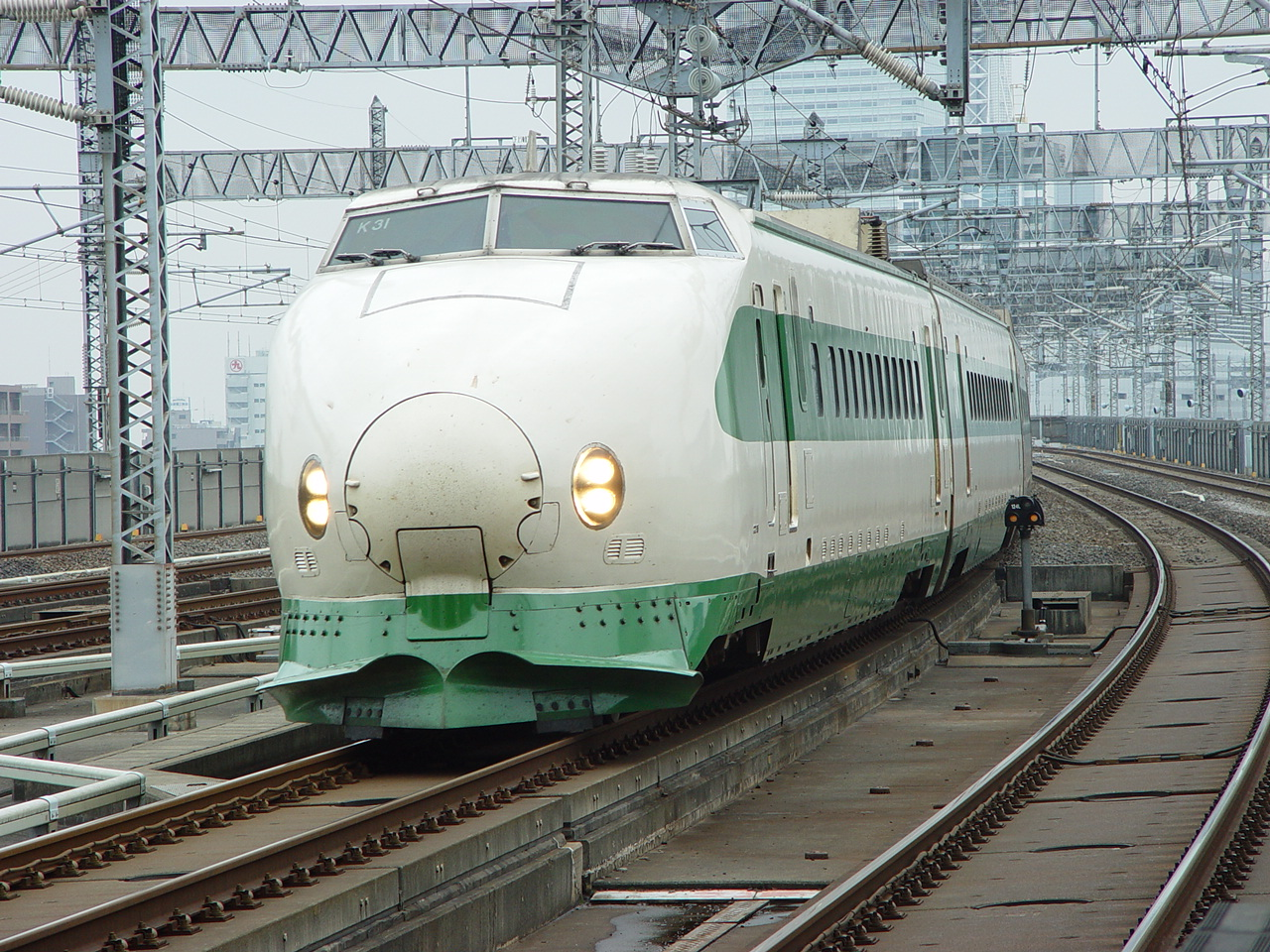
10-car set K31 on a Nasuno service in June 2002

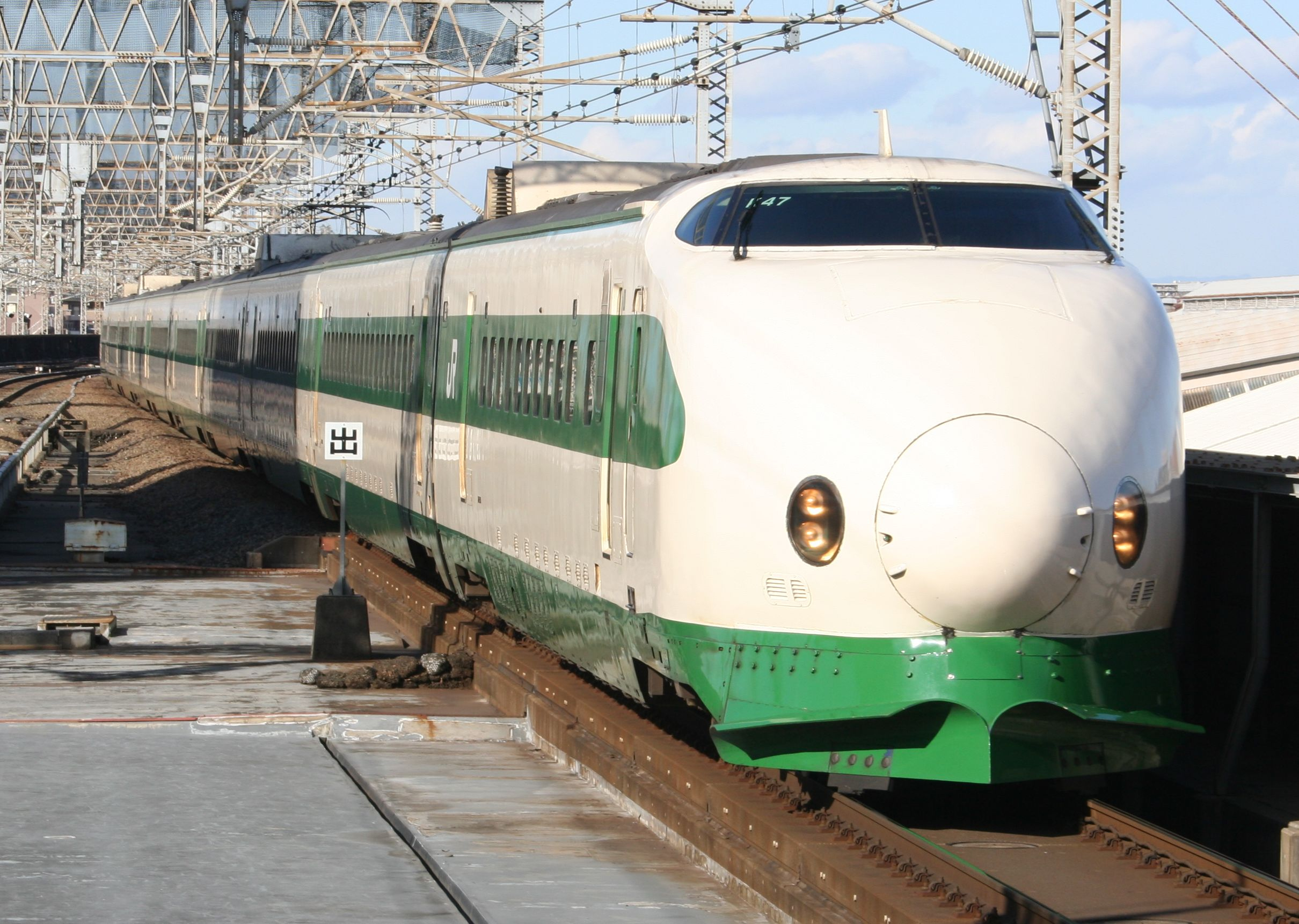
Reliveried set K47 on a Tanigawa service in January 2011

8-car and later 10-car sets with a maximum speed of 240 km/h (149 mph) modified with nose-end couplers to operate in conjunction with 400 series Yamagata Shinkansen sets and E3 series Akita Shinkansen sets.

The remaining sets in use on the Tōhoku Shinkansen were withdrawn from 19 November 2011, but 200 series sets continued to be used on the Jōetsu Shinkansen. The last remaining sets were withdrawn from regular service by the start of the revised timetable on 16 March 2013.

==== Formations ====
The K sets are formed as follows.

Car No.	1	2	3	4	5	6	7	8	9	10
Designation	Mc	M'	M	M'	M	M'	Mpk	M'	Ms	M'c
Numbering	221	226	225	226	225	226	225	226	215	222

==== Interior ====
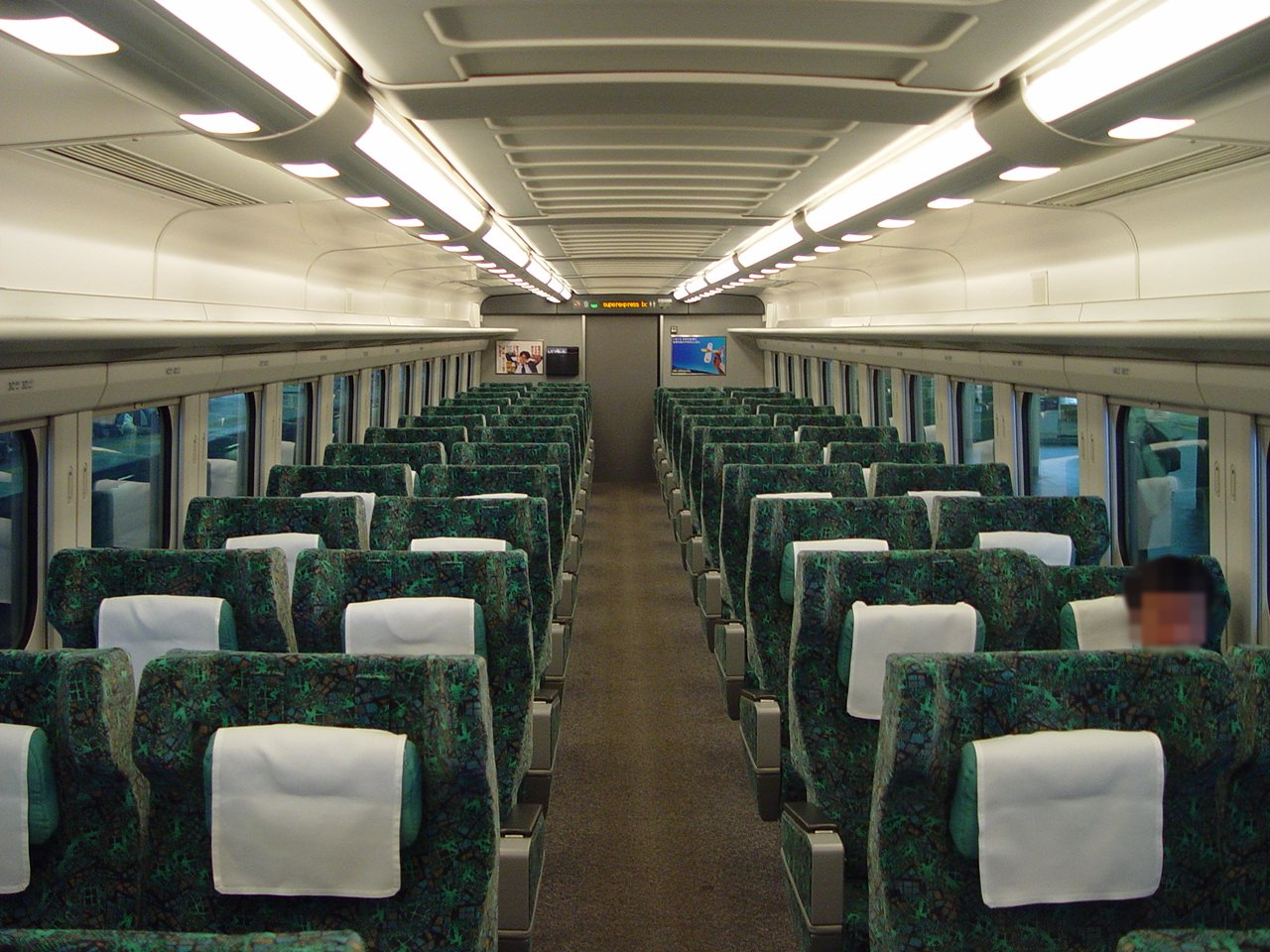
Refurbished Green car, August 2002

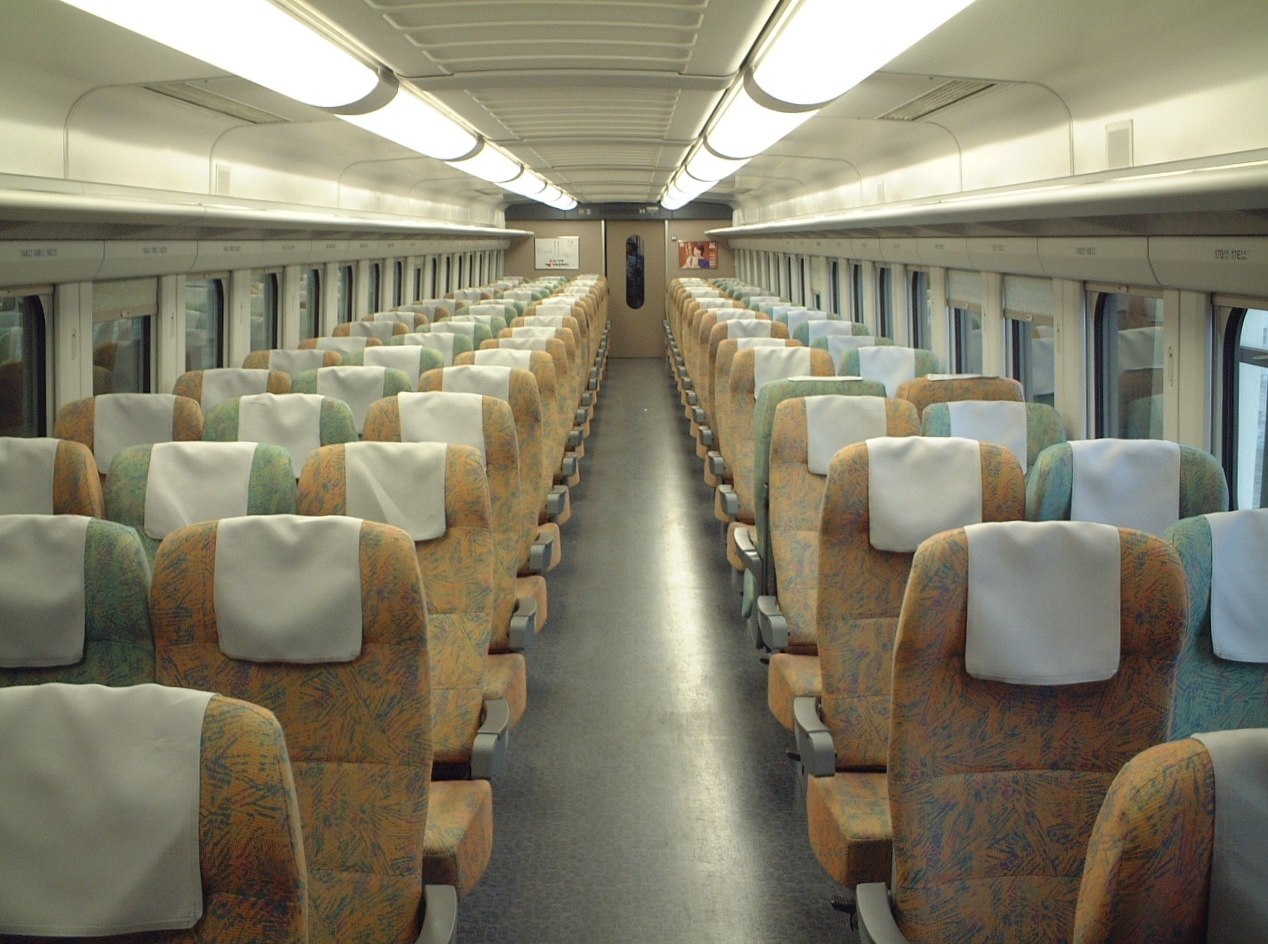
Refurbished standard-class car, January 2002

== Special event train services ==
=== Tohoku Shinkansen 25th anniversary ===
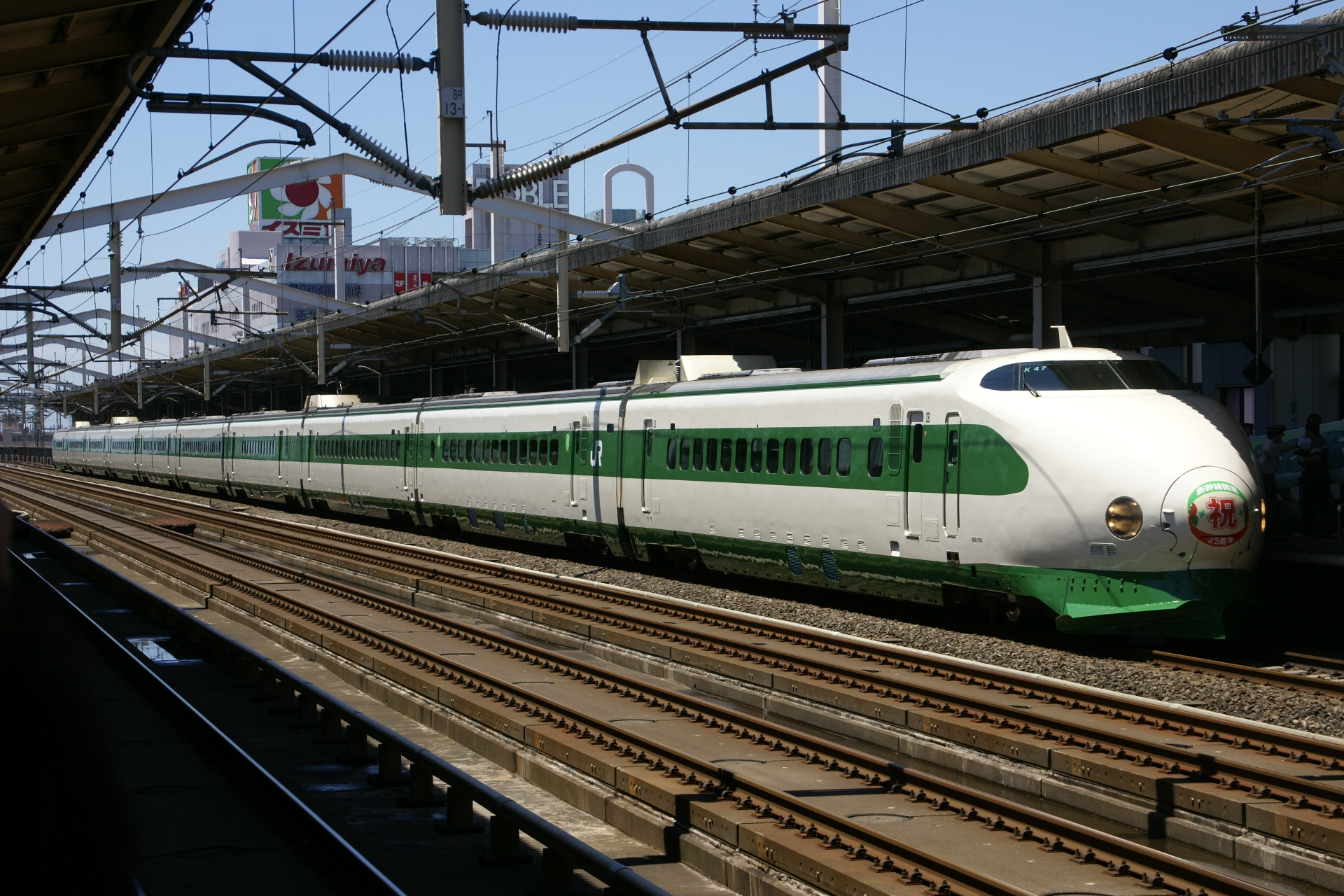
Refurbished 10-car set K47 in "revival livery" on a special 25th anniversary working, 23 June 2007

On 23 June 2007, 10-car set K47 was used for a special Yamabiko 931 service from Omiya to Morioka to mark the 25th anniversary of the opening of the Tohoku Shinkansen. Set K47 was specially repainted back into its original ivory and green livery for this event.

=== Tohoku Shinkansen 30th anniversary ===
On 23 June 2012, 10-car set K47 was used for a special Yamabiko 235 service from Omiya to Morioka to mark the 30th anniversary of the opening of the Tohoku Shinkansen.

=== Joetsu Shinkansen 30th anniversary ===
On 17 November 2012, 10-car set K47 was used for a special Joetsu Shinkansen 30th Anniversary (上越新幹線開業30周年号」, Jōetsu Shinkansen Kaigyō 30-shūnen-gō) service, running as Toki 395, from Omiya to Niigata.

=== Sayonara 200 series Yamabiko ===
On 30 March 2013, 10-car set K47 was used for a special Sayonara 200 series Yamabiko (さよなら200系やまびこ号) train operated from Morioka to Tokyo, following the withdrawal of 200 series trains from regular scheduled services on 16 March.

=== Arigato 200 series ===
On 13 April 2013, a special Arigato 200 series (ありがとう200系号) service ran from Sendai to Ueno in Tokyo.

=== Sayonara 200 series ===
On 14 April 2013, 10-car set K47 was used for two final Sayonara 200 series (さよなら200系号) services from Niigata to Tokyo and from Omiya to Niigata, marking the last public operation of the 200 series trains.

== Derailment ==
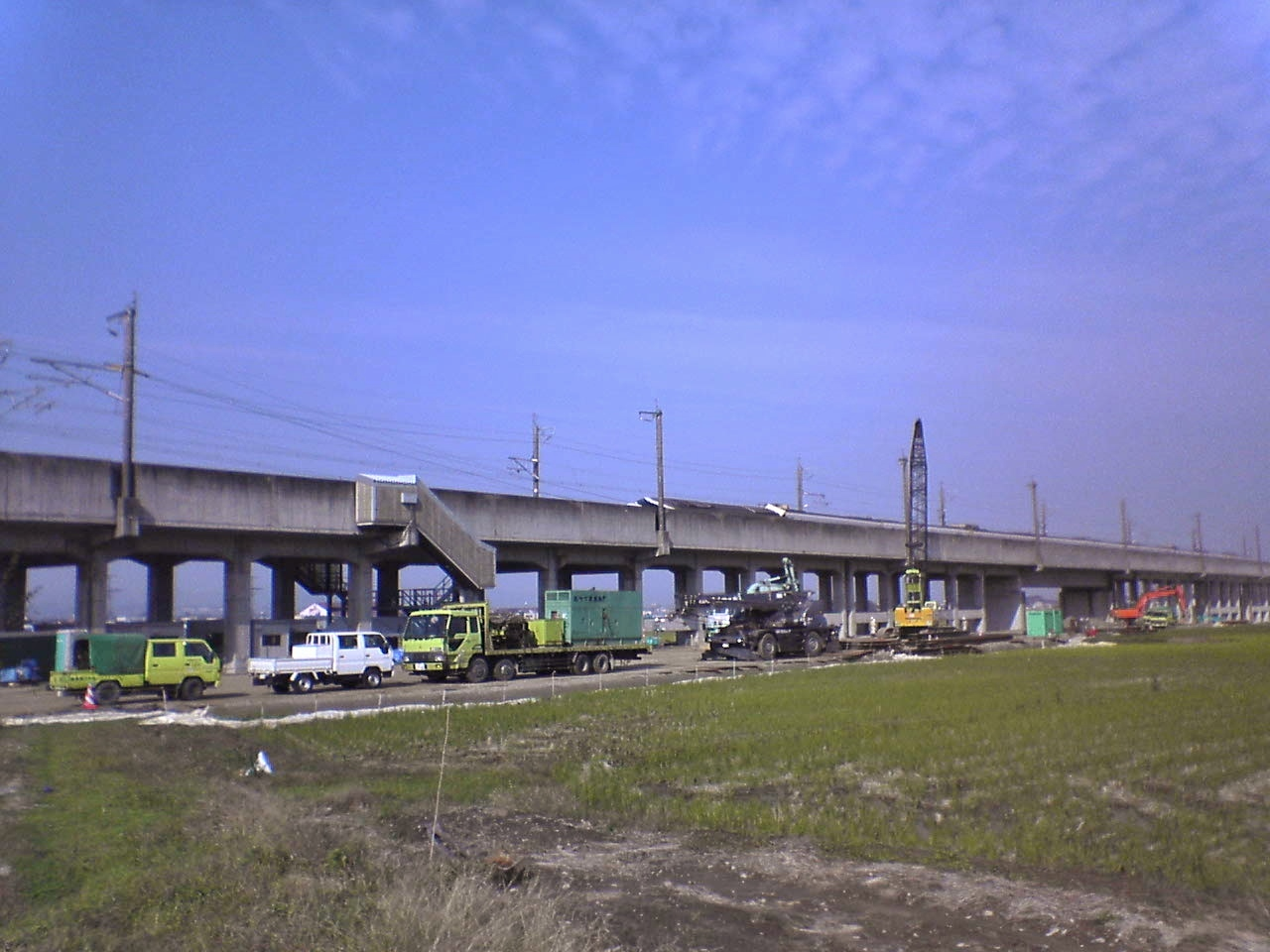
View of the derailed train several days after the earthquake

A refurbished 200 series train (set K25 on the Toki 325 service) derailed on the Jōetsu Shinkansen line while travelling at a speed of approximately 200 km/h (120 mph) between Nagaoka Station and Urasa Station on 23 October 2004 during the 2004 Chūetsu earthquake. Eight of the ten cars were derailed. This was the first derailment of a Shinkansen train in service. None of the 155 passengers on board were injured. Set K25 was officially withdrawn on 25 March 2005.

== Preserved examples ==
- 221-1 and 237-1 (ex-set E1, later F30) at Sendai General Shinkansen Depot
- 222-35 (ex-set K31) at The Railway Museum in Saitama, Saitama
- 221-1510 (ex-set F13, later K47) outside Niigata City Niitsu Railway Museum in Niitsu, Niigata since June 2013
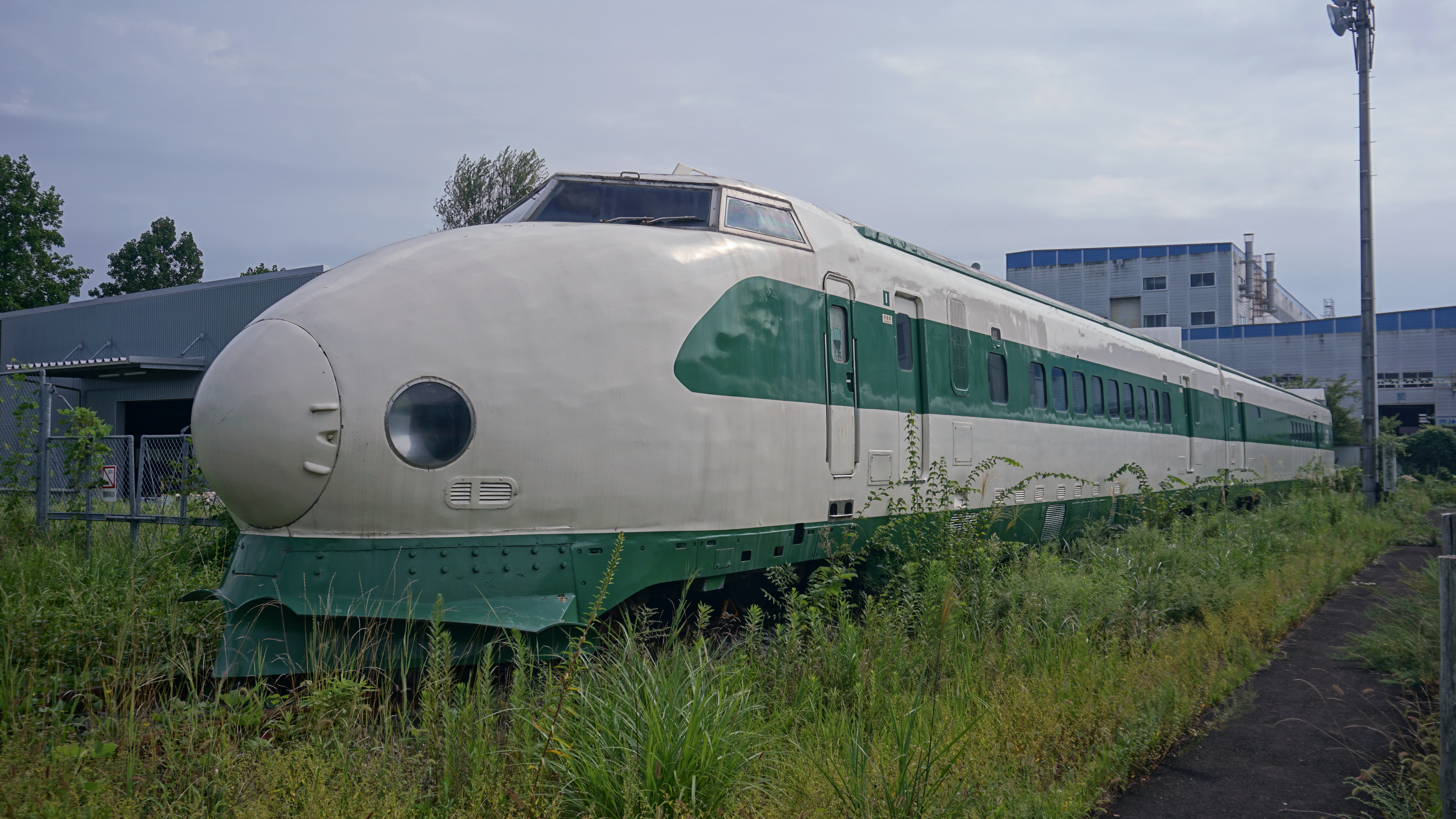
Preserved cars 221-1 and 237-1 at Sendai General Shinkansen Depot in September 2024

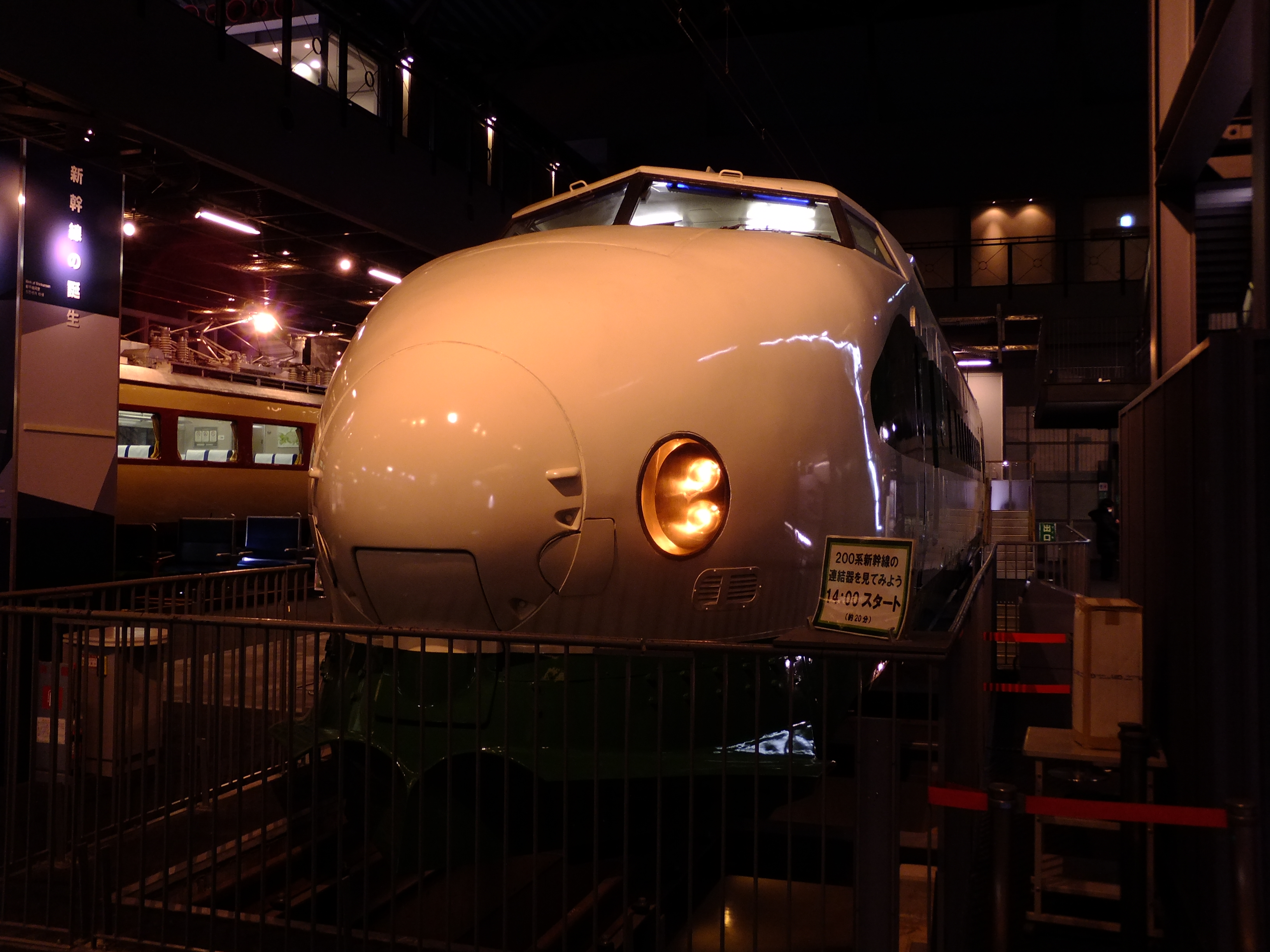
Preserved car 222-35 at the Railway Museum in Saitama in January 2015

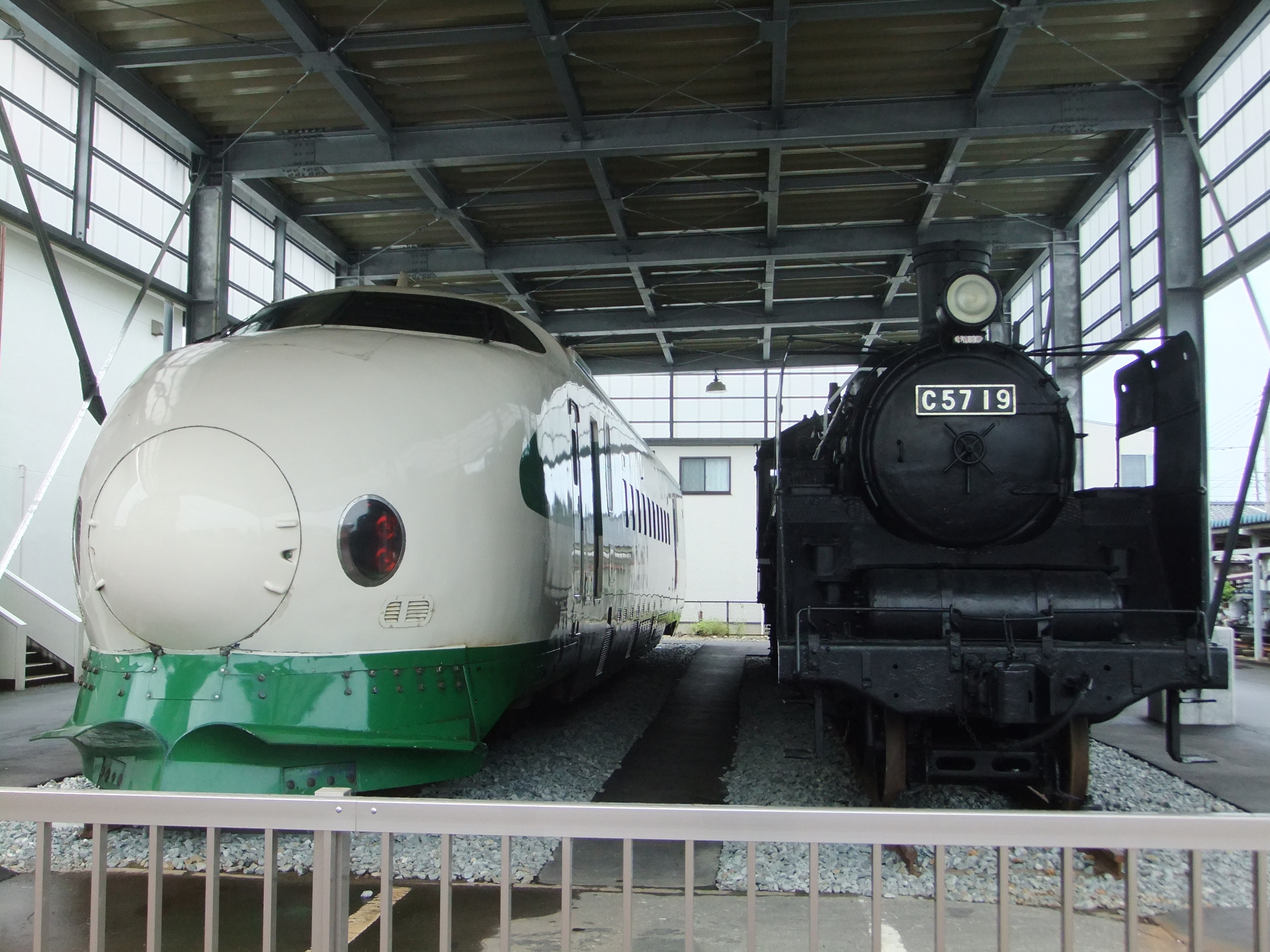
Preserved car 221-1510 outside the Niigata City Niitsu Railway Museum in August 2014

=== Formerly preserved ===
- 215-1, 222-1, 226-1 (all ex-set E1, later F30), and 249-5 (ex-set H5) stored outdoors at Sendai General Shinkansen Depot, but all cut up in 2010
- 215-15, 221-15 and 237-15 (ex-set E15, later F37) next to Nagareyama Onsen Station on the Hakodate Main Line (cut up in June 2013)
- 221-1505 (ex-set K25) was at JR East General Training Center in Shirakawa City. Fukushima Prefecture where it was displayed until it was scrapped.
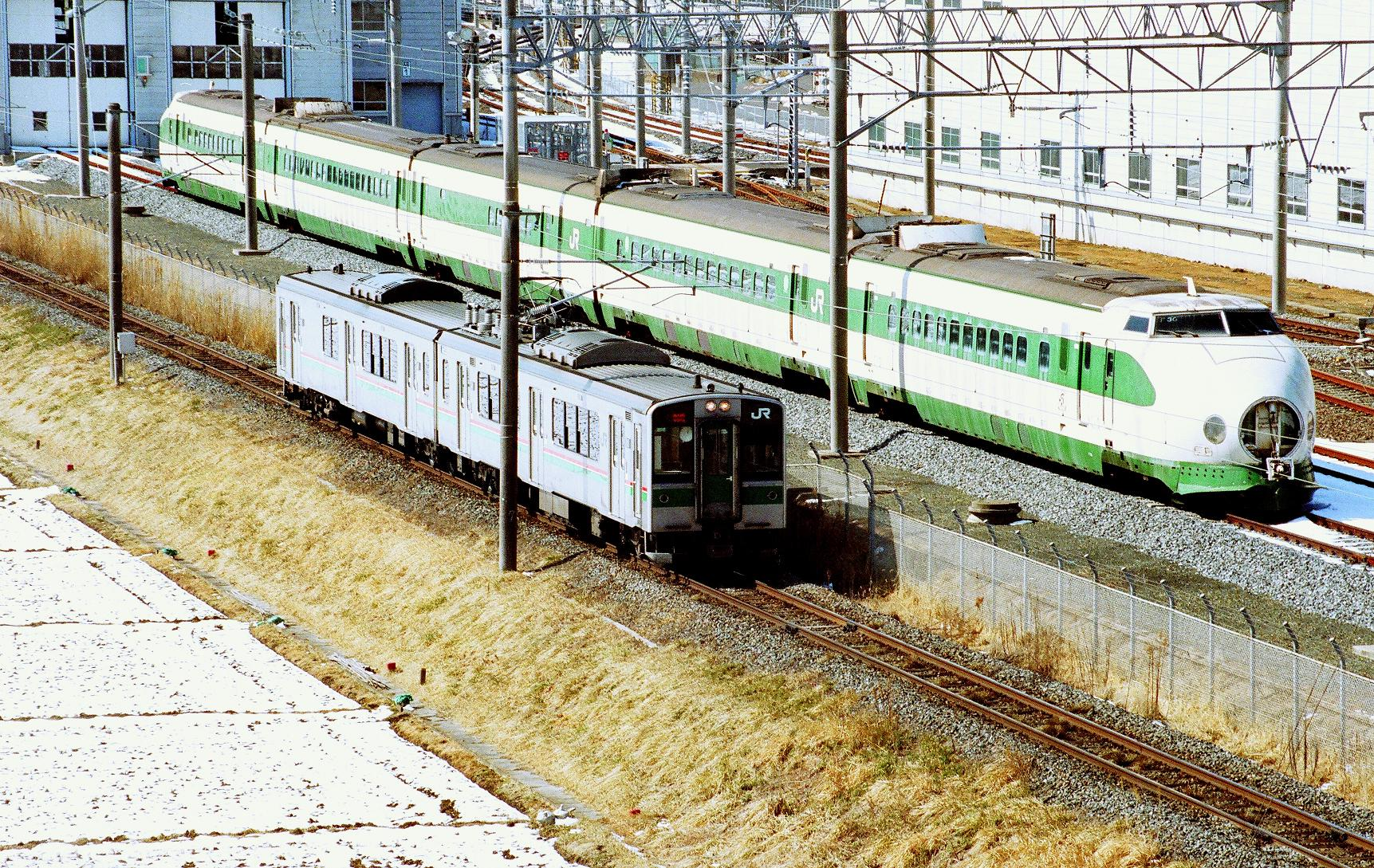
Five cars of former set F30 stored at Sendai General Shinkansen Depot in January 2003

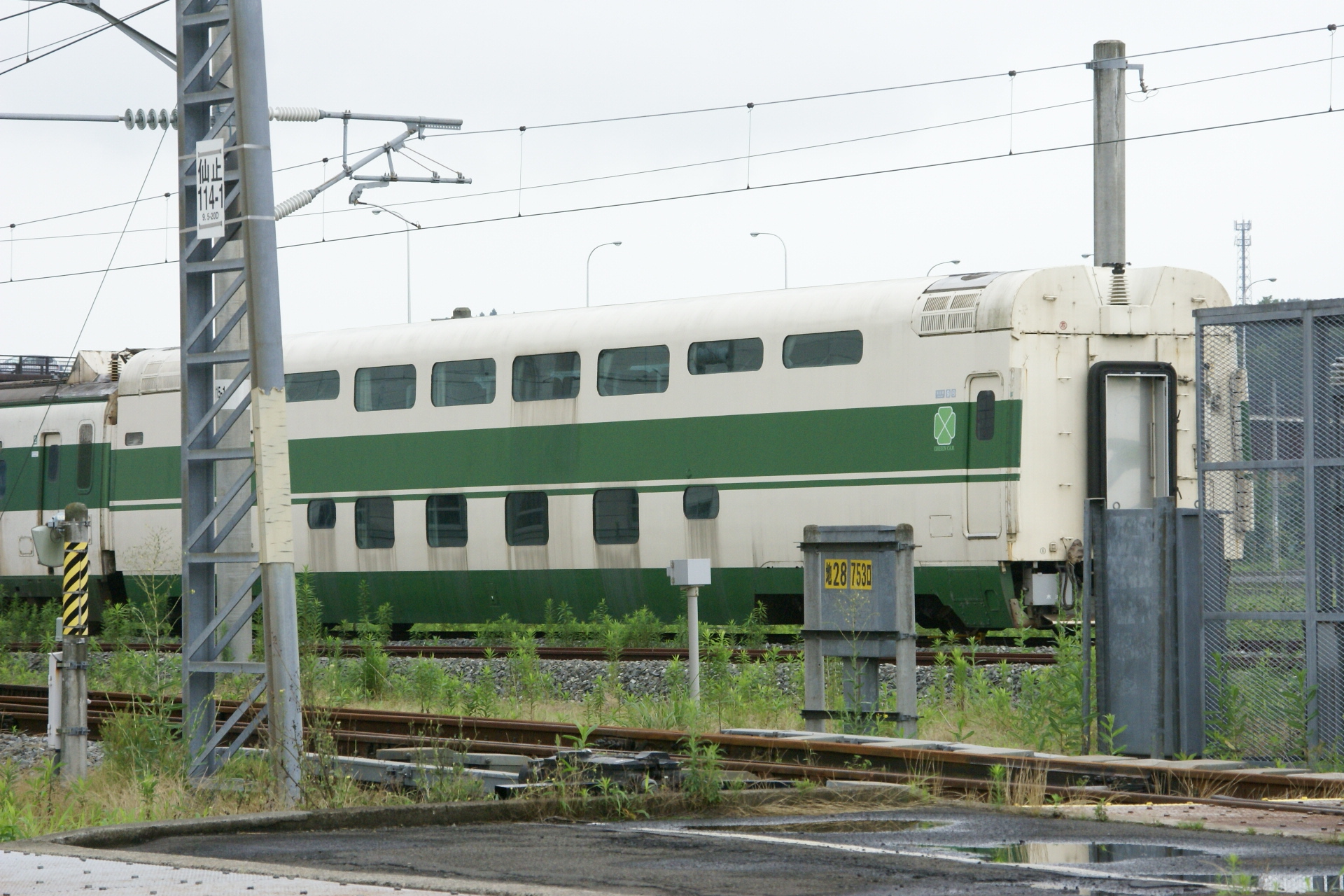
Car 249-5 of former set H5 stored at Sendai General Shinkansen Depot in July 2008

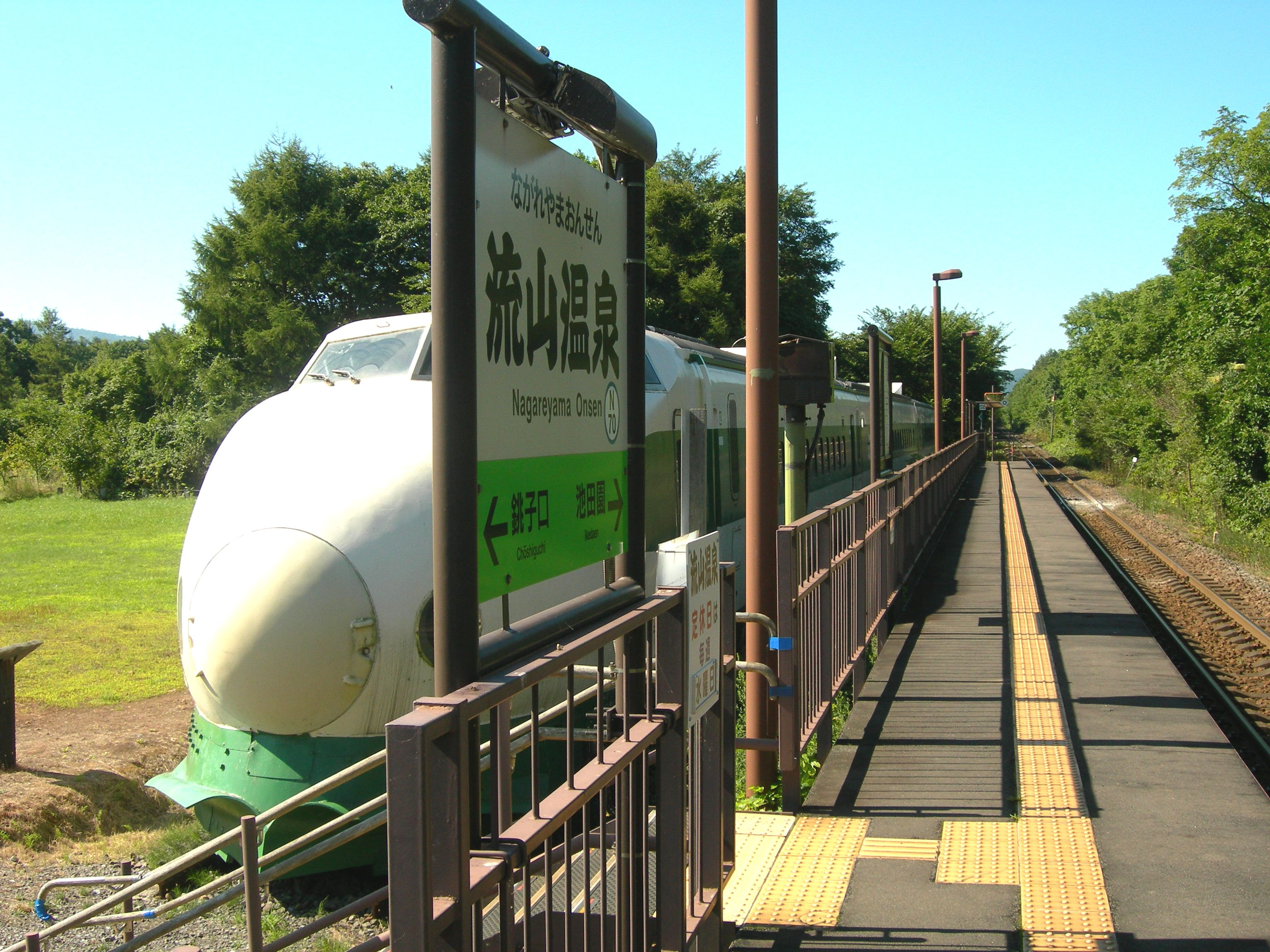
Preserved 200 series cars next to Nagareyama Onsen Station in Hokkaido in August 2011

== See also ==
- List of high speed trains
