= Aoba (train) =

Former Japanese train service (ceased 1997)

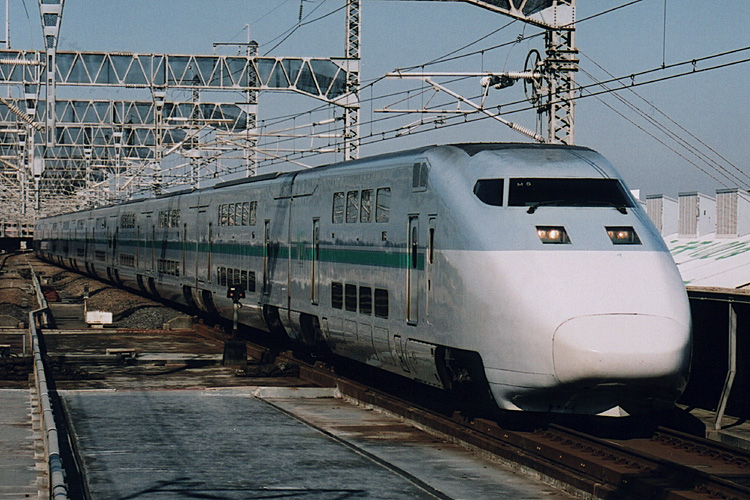
- A E1 Shinkansen, similar to the one used on Aoba services

Overview
- Service type: Shinkansen
- Locale: Tōhoku region
- First service: 20 November 1945 (Express); 20 March 1971 (Limited express); 23 June 1982 (Shinkansen)
- Last service: 30 September 1997
- Successor: Nasuno, Yamabiko
- Former operators: JNR; JR East

Route
- Termini: Tokyo; Sendai
- Distance travelled: 325.4 km (202.2 mi)
- Service frequency: Hourly

On-board services
- Class: Standard + Green

Technical
- Rolling stock: 200 series, E1 series
- Track gauge: 1,435 mm (4 ft 8 1/2 in)
- Electrification: 25 kV AC overhead
- Operating speed: 240 km/h (150 mph)

Aoba (あおば(青葉), named after Aoba Castle) is the name of a number of train services that formerly operated in Japan by Japanese National Railways (JNR), and most recently an all-stations service operated by East Japan Railway Company (JR East) until September 1997 on the high-speed Tōhoku Shinkansen in Japan.

== History ==
=== Express ===
The name Aoba (written as "青葉") was first used from 20 November 1945 on an express (急行, kyūkō) service between Ueno in Tokyo and Sendai on the Tōhoku Main Line. This continued until the train was renamed Kitakami (きたかみ) on 1 October 1965.

=== Limited express ===
The Aoba name (written as "あおば") was reintroduced from 20 March 1971 on Limited express services between Sendai and Akita. These services were discontinued on 24 November 1975.

=== Shinkansen ===
From the start of services on the newly opened Tōhoku Shinkansen on 23 June 1982, Aoba was the name used for the all-stations shinkansen services operating initially between Ōmiya and Sendai, later between Ueno and Sendai, and eventually between Tokyo and Sendai. Services initially used 200 series 12-car "E" sets with a Green (first class) car as car 7, and a buffet counter in car 9. Services later used 8-car 200 series "G" sets with a Green (first class) car as car 5, and a buffet counter in car 7. When the E1 Shinkansen made its debut, one set was used on Max Aoba services between Nasushiobara and Tokyo.

==== 12-car E sets ====
Car No.	1	2	3	4	5	6	7	8	9	10	11	12
Numbering	221	226	225	226	225–400	226	215	226	237	226	225	222
Class	Standard	Standard	Standard	Standard	Standard	Standard	Green	Standard	Buffet counter	Standard	Standard	Standard

==== 8-car G sets ====
Car No.	1	2	3	4	5	6	7	8
Numbering	221	226	225–400	226	215	226	237	222
Class	Standard	Standard	Standard	Standard	Green	Standard	Buffet counter	Standard

The number of Aoba services was reduced from 1 December 1995, following the introduction of the Nasuno all-stations service, and the name was finally discontinued from 1 October 1997 when the remaining trains were integrated with Yamabiko services.

== Former rolling stock ==
- 200 Series 12 car E sets (23 June 1982 - 1 October 1997)
- 200 Series 8 car G sets (23 June 1982 - 1 October 1997)
- E1 Series 12 car sets (Max Aoba) (15 July 1994 - 1 October 1997)
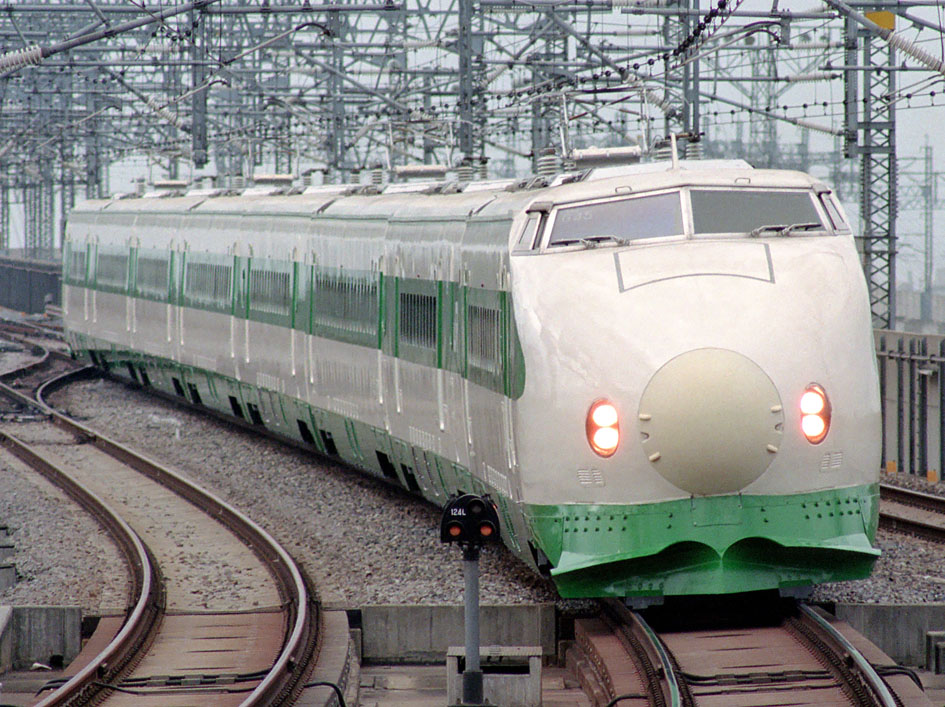
Set G45 of the 200 series Shinkansen, similar to those used on Aoba services

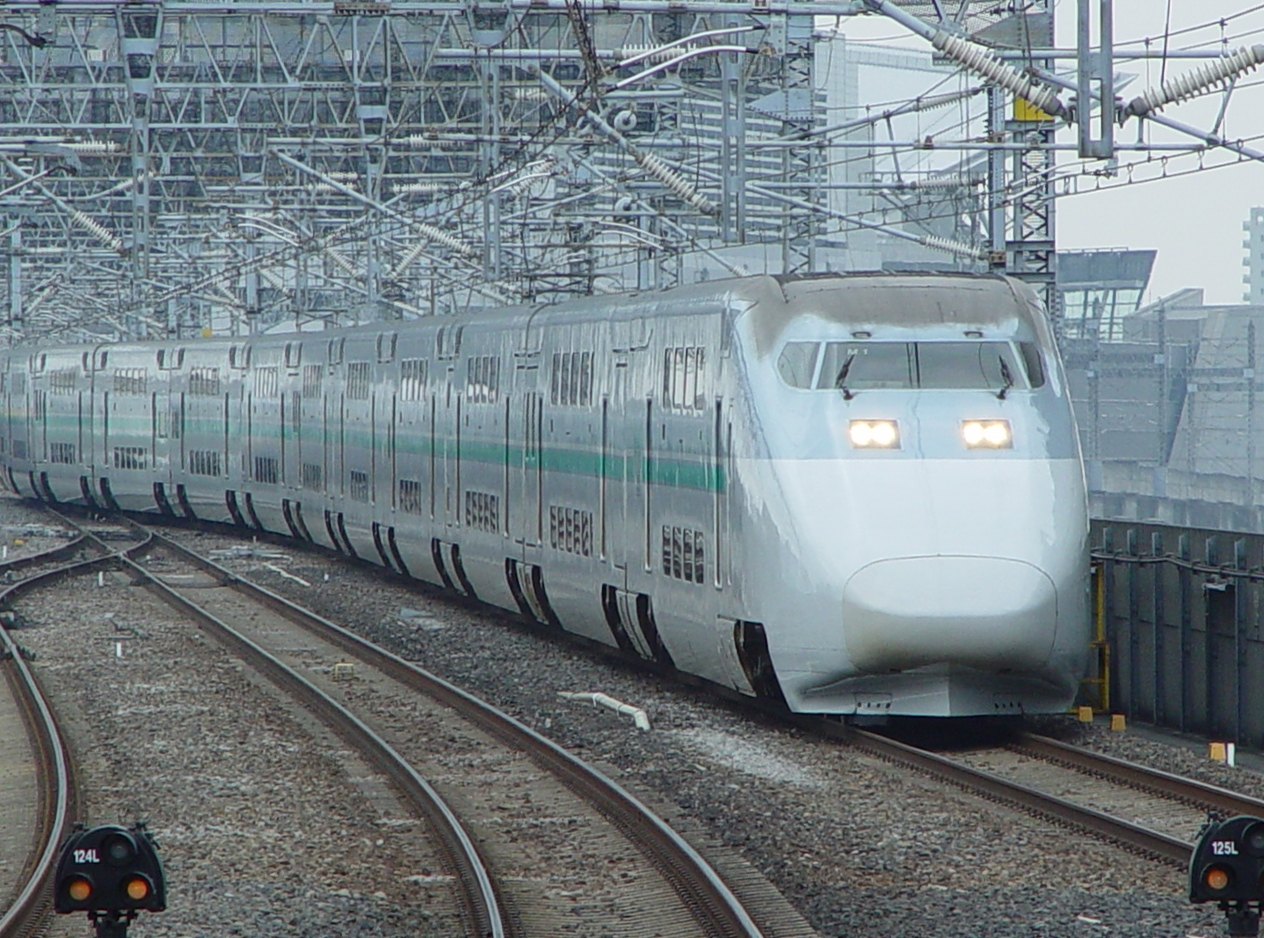
An E1 series Shinkansen, similar to the one used on Aoba services.

== See also ==
- List of named passenger trains of Japan
