= Nasuno =

Japanese high-speed Shinkansen train service

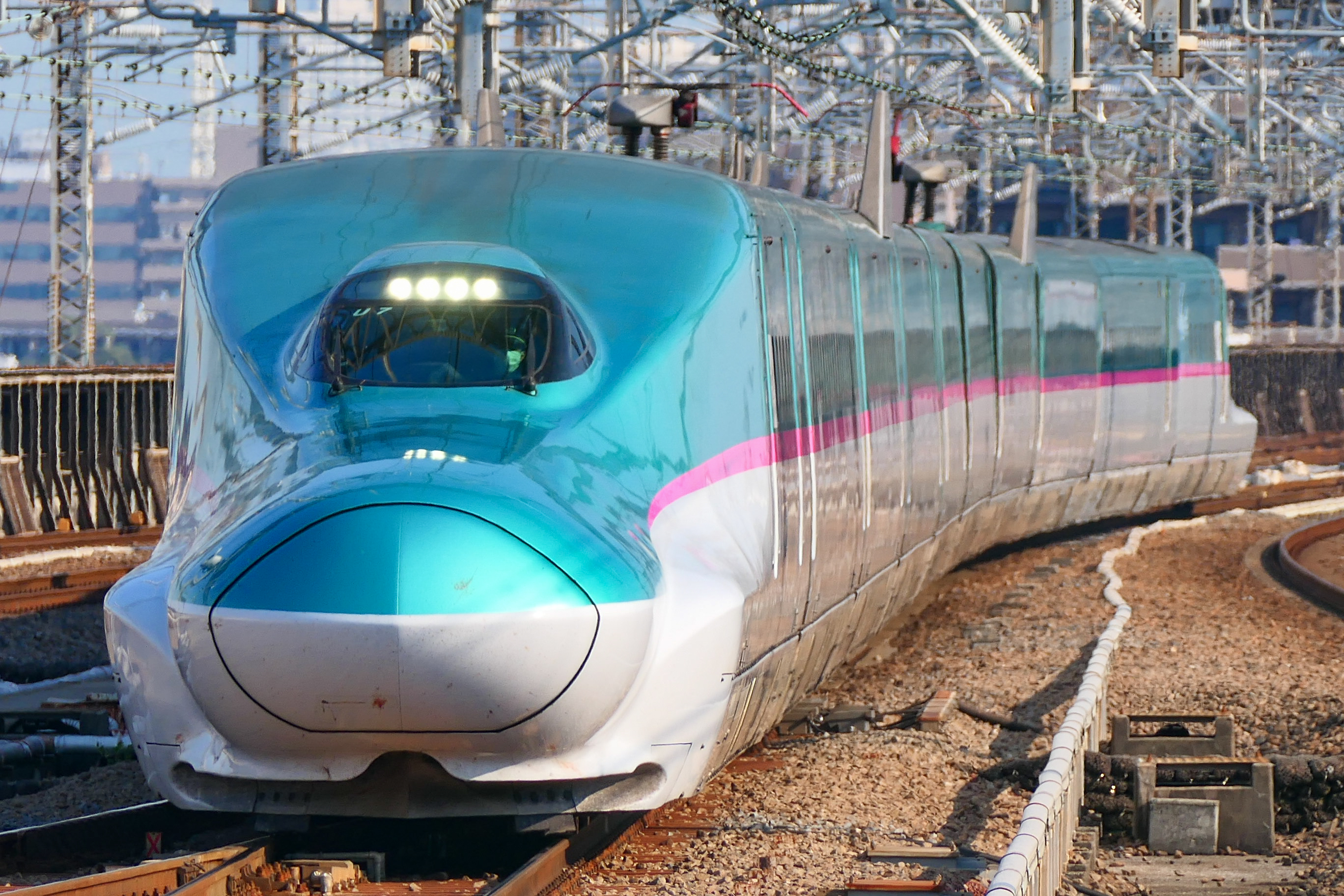
- E5 series set operating a Nasuno service entering Ōmiya Station, July 2022

Overview
- Service type: Shinkansen (Local)
- Status: Operational
- Locale: Honshu, Japan
- First service: 22 September 1959 (traditional semi-express service); 10 December 1995 (Shinkansen local service)
- Current operator: JR East
- Former operator: Japan National Railway

Route
- Termini: Tokyo; Kōriyama
- Stops: 8
- Distance travelled: 213.9 km (132.9 mi)
- Line used: Tōhoku Shinkansen

On-board services
- Classes: Ordinary, Green, Gran Class (Note: Gran Class is only offered on E5 series sets.)
- Seating arrangements: 3+2 (Ordinary car); 2+2 (Green car); 1+2 (Gran Class)

Technical
- Rolling stock: E2 and E5 series
- Track gauge: 1,435 mm (4 ft 8 1/2 in) standard gauge
- Electrification: Overhead line, 25 kV 50 Hz AC
- Operating speed: 275–320 km/h (171–199 mph) (Note: Top speed of 275 km/h (171 mph) when operated with an E2 series set and 320 km/h (200 mph) when operated with an E5 series set.)
- Track owner: JR East

The Nasuno (Japanese: なすの; lit. 'Nasu Field') is a local high-speed Shinkansen service operated on the Tōhoku Shinkansen by East Japan Railway Company (JR East) in Japan. It serves all stations between Tokyo and Kōriyama, a medium-sized city approximately 225 km north of Tokyo.

== Origin ==
The name Nasuno is derived from the Nasu Highlands (那須高原) and Nasu Onsen (那須温泉) areas located alongside the Tōhoku Shinkansen between Utsunomiya and Kōriyama.

== Operations ==
There are approximately 16 return Nasuno trains daily, starting/terminating either at Oyama, Nasushiobara, or Kōriyama. Nasuno services stop at all stations en route. Double-decker Nasuno services formed of E4 series sets also operated up until September 2012, named Max Nasuno.

== Rolling stock ==
- E2 series (since March 1997)
- E5 series (since 17 March 2012)
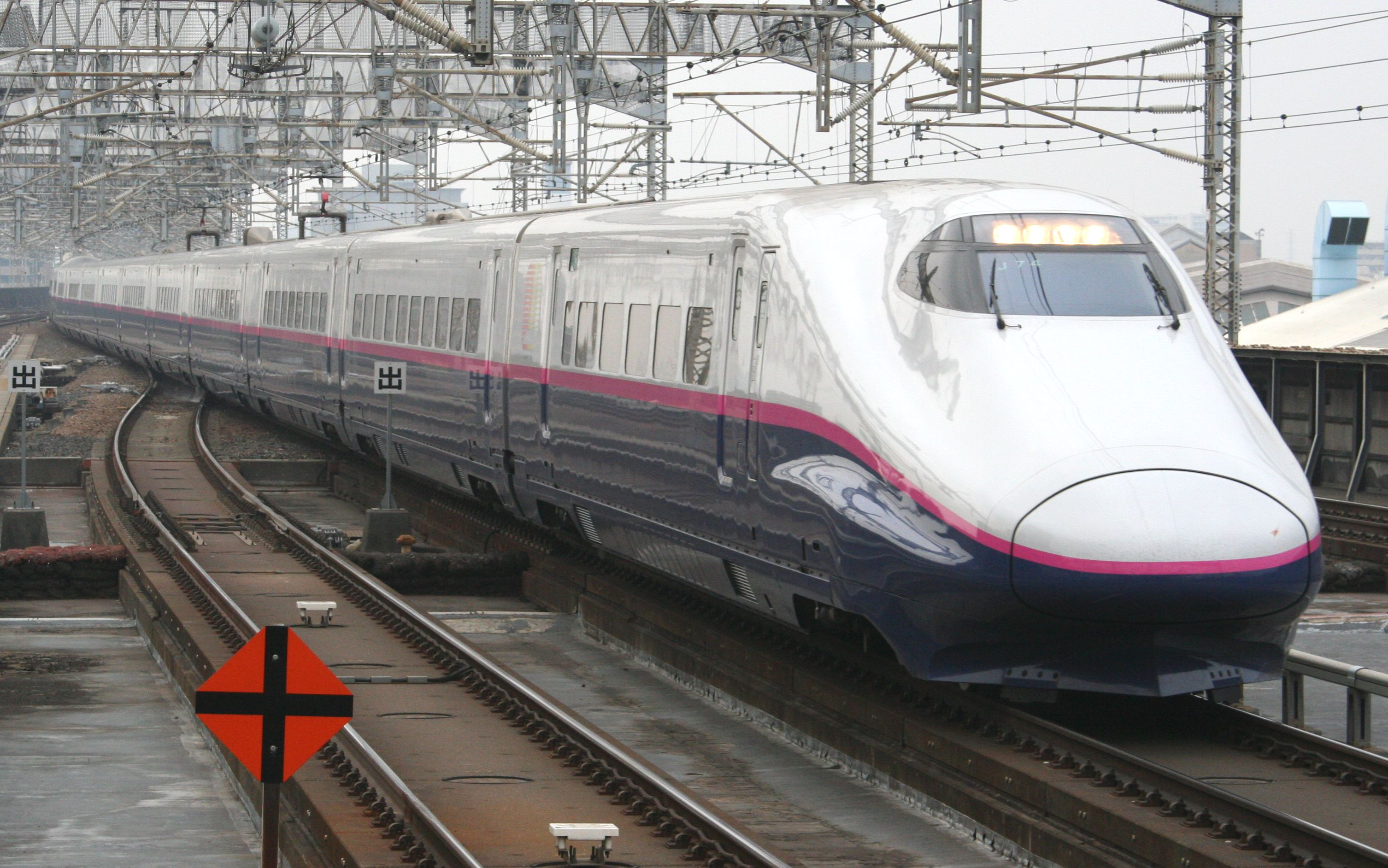
E2 series

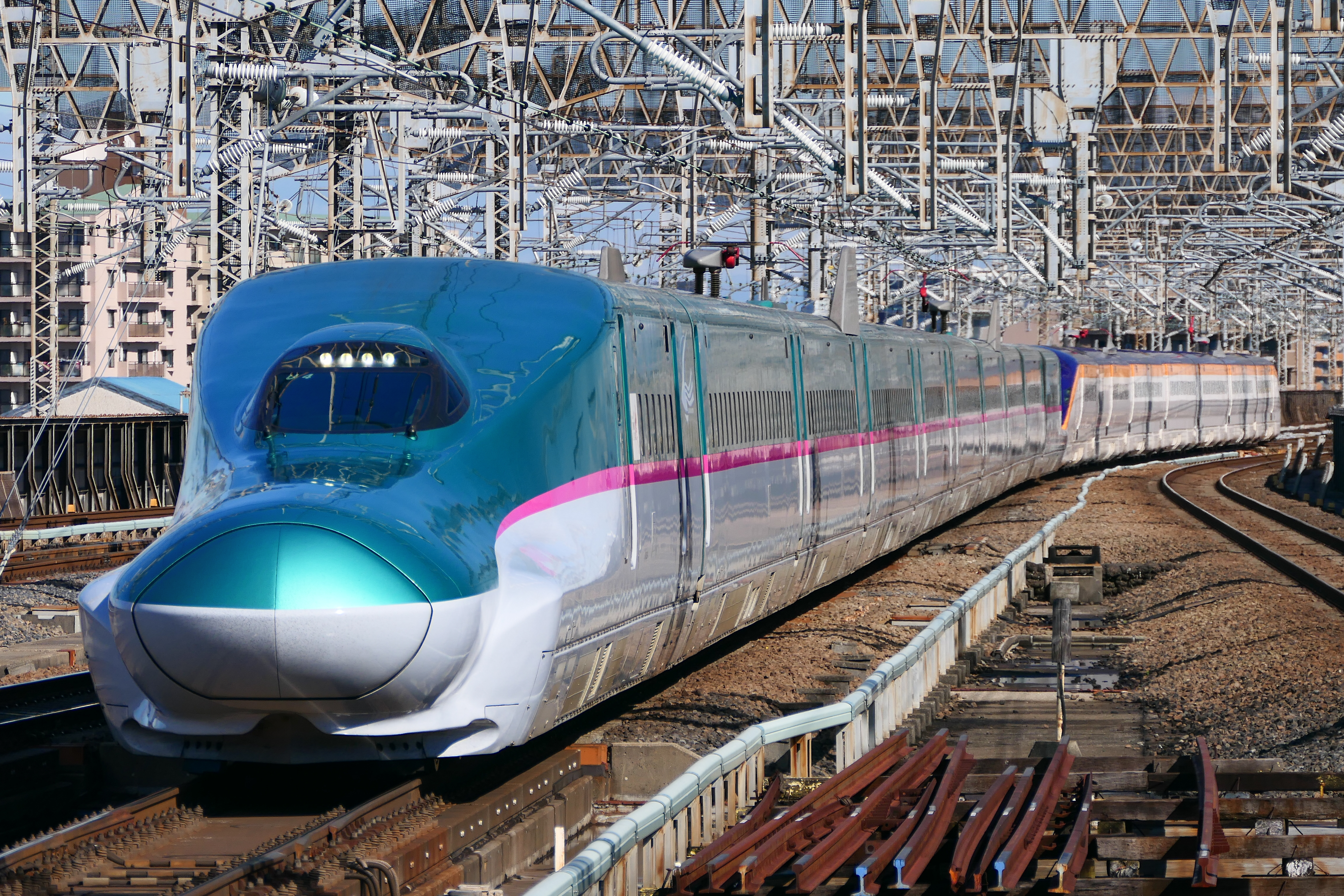
E5 series

=== Former rolling stock ===
- 200 series (10 December 1995 – November 2011)
- E1 series (Max Nasuno) (15 July 1994 – December 1999)
- E4 series (Max Nasuno) (20 December 1997 – 28 September 2012)
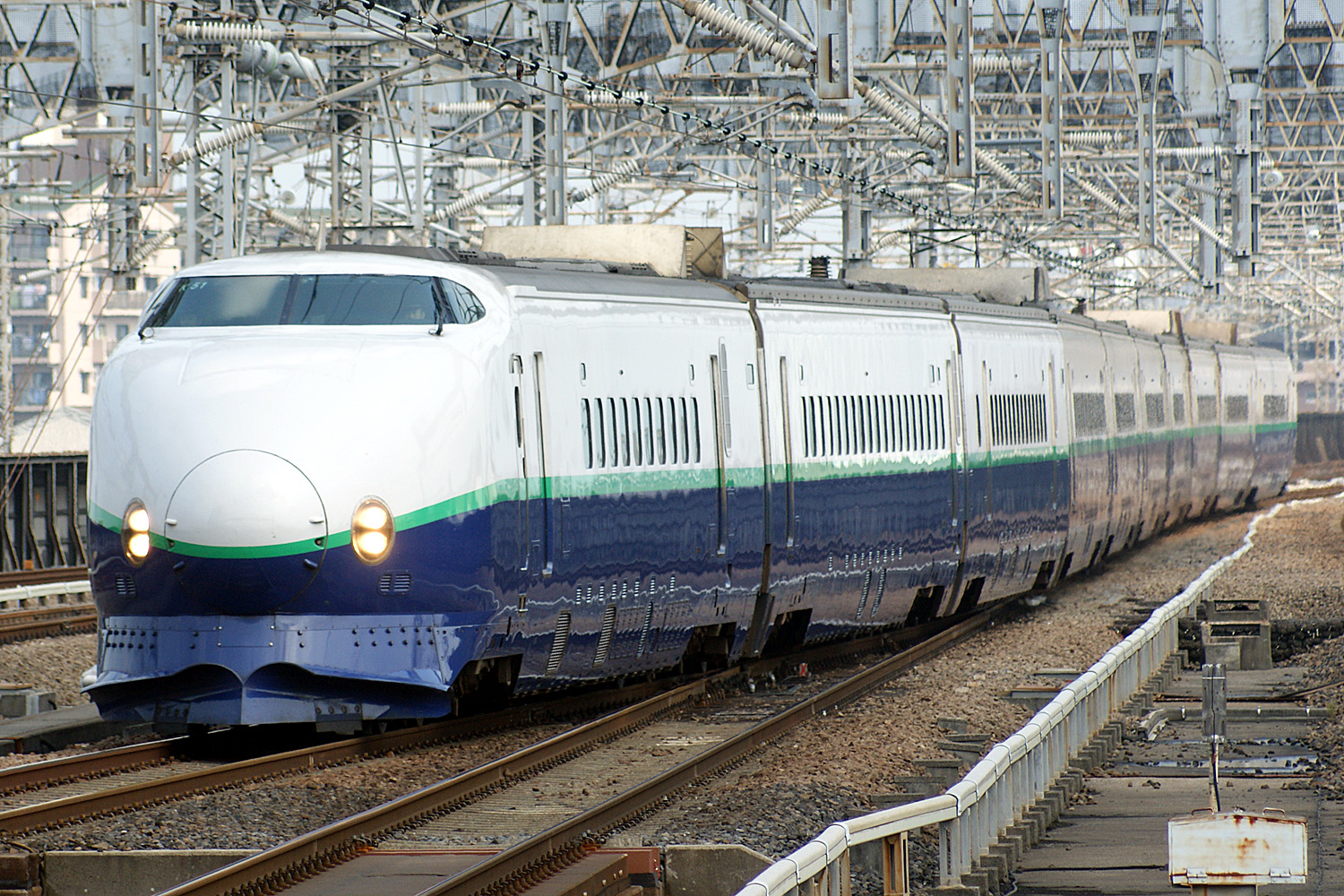
200 series

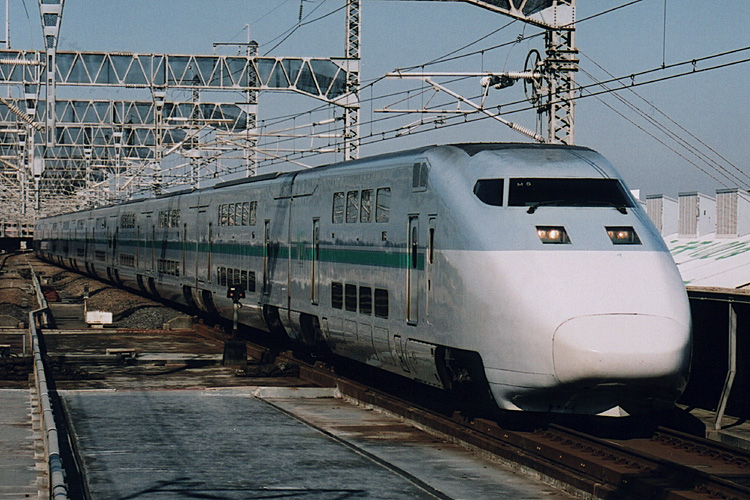
E1 series

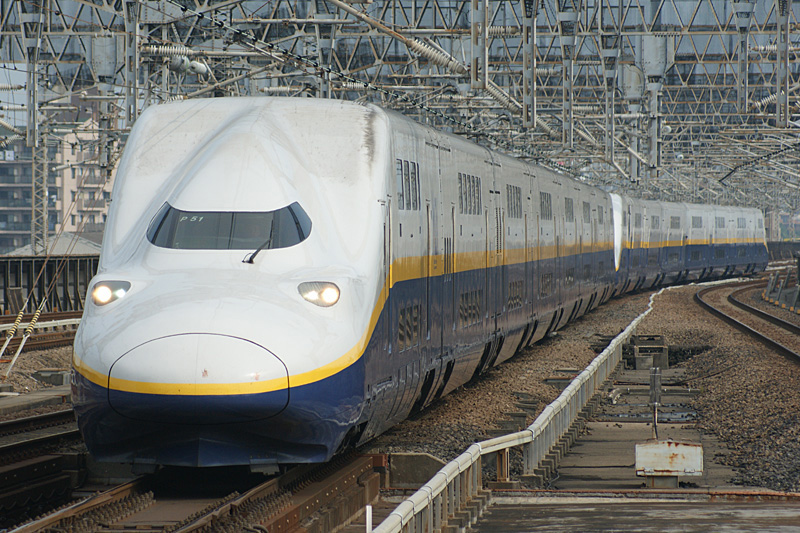
E4 series

== History ==
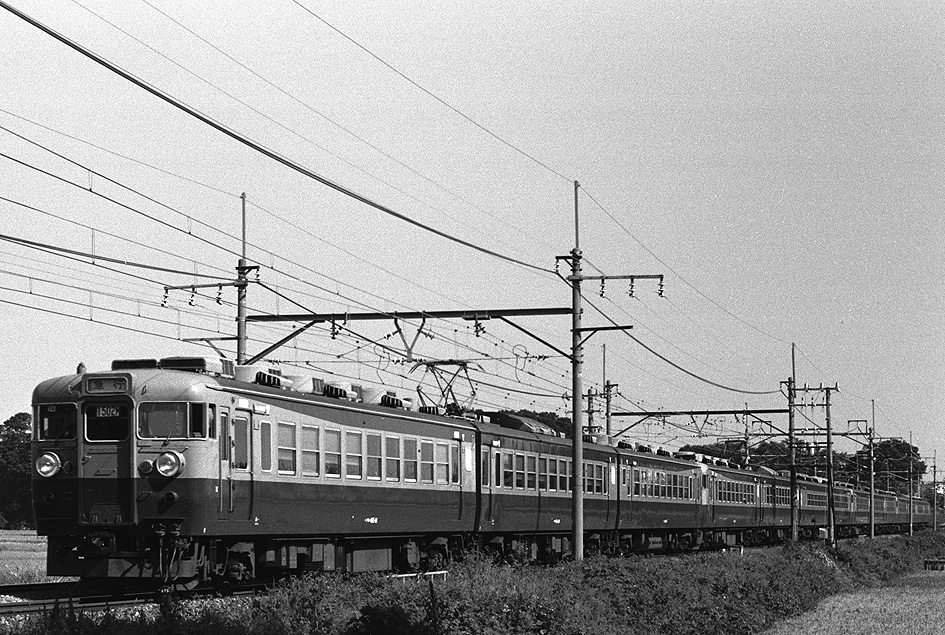
165 series Nasuno service, 1984

The name Nasuno was first introduced on 22 September 1959 for semi-express (準急, junkyū) services operating between Ueno in Tokyo and Kuroiso on the Tōhoku Main Line. In 1966, this was upgraded to become an express (急行, kyūkō), and on 14 March 1985, it was upgraded to become a Limited express using 185 series EMU rolling stock. From 10 March 1990, the train was rerouted to operate between Shinjuku in Tokyo and Kuroiso.

On 10 December 1995, the name was adopted for the new all-stations services on the Tōhoku Shinkansen. The Tōhoku Main Line services to and from Shinjuku were renamed Ohayō Tochigi and Hometown Tochigi from this date. Prior to 1995, Aoba services formed the all-stations services along the whole line. However, with the introduction of short-distance Nasuno services, Aoba services were reduced, and in 1997, discontinued altogether, with the local services covered by Nasuno as far as Kōriyama, and all further stations served by the Yamabiko.

== See also ==
- List of named passenger trains of Japan
