= Kodama (train) =

Japanese high-speed Shinkansen train service

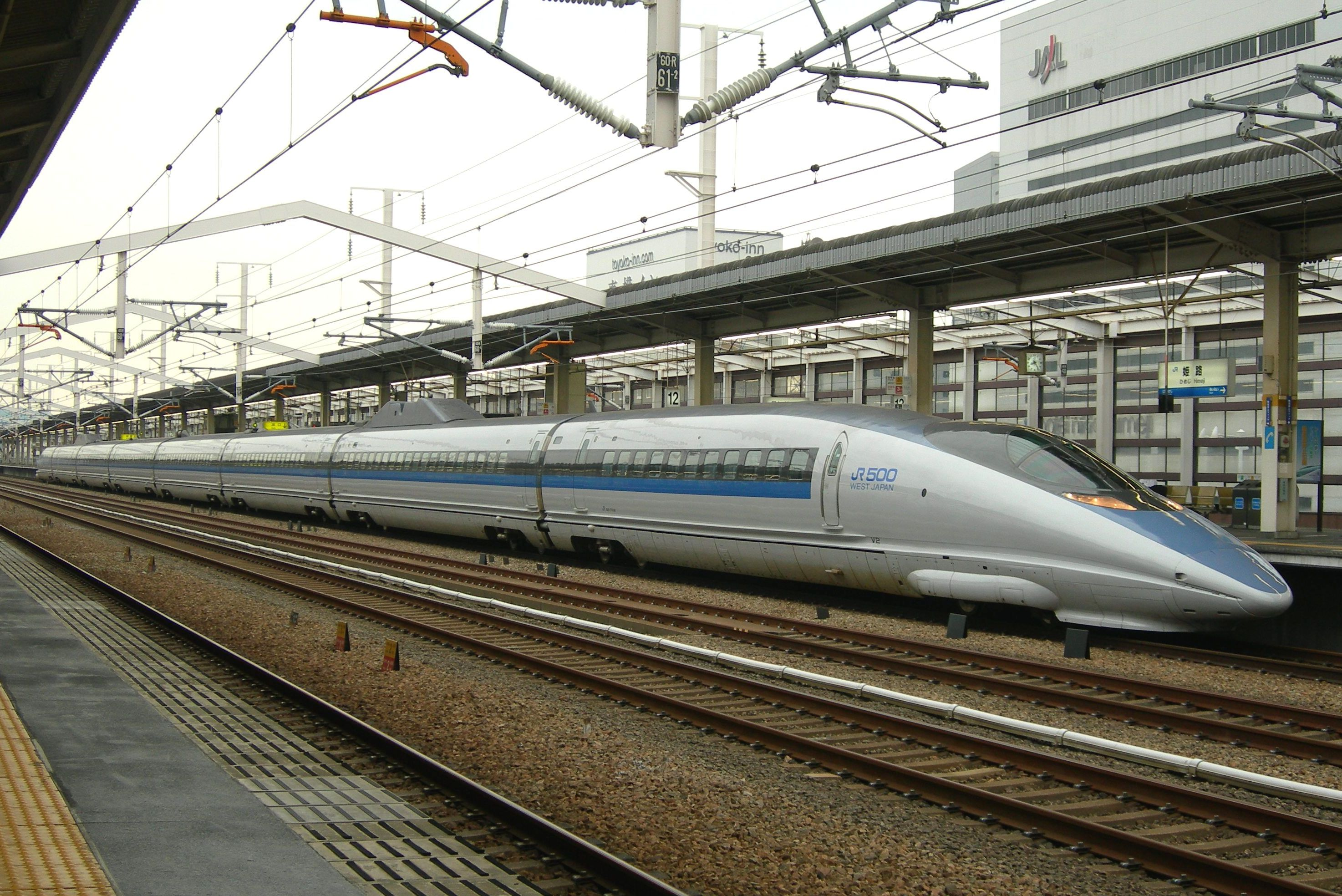
- JR West 8-car 500 Series Shinkansen on a Kodama service at Himeji Station, August 2009

Overview
- Service type: Shinkansen (Local)
- Status: Operational
- First service: 1958 (Limited express); 1 October 1964 (Shinkansen)
- Current operators: JR Central, JR West

Route
- Termini: Tokyo (Tōkaidō Shinkansen); Shin-Osaka (Tokaido Shinkansen and San'yō Shinkansen); Hakata or Hakataminami (San'yō Shinkansen)
- Lines used: Tokaido Shinkansen; San'yō Shinkansen

On-board services
- Class: Green/ordinary
- Catering facilities: None

Technical
- Rolling stock: 500/700/N700/N700A/N700S series
- Track gauge: 1,435 mm (4 ft 8 1/2 in) standard gauge
- Electrification: Overhead line, 25 kV 60 Hz AC
- Operating speed: 285 km/h (175 mph)

Kodama (Japanese: こだま; lit. 'Echo') is the slowest, all-stops train service operating on Japan's Tōkaidō and San'yō Shinkansen lines. The Kodama trains are used primarily for travel to and from smaller cities along the line. Travelers between major cities generally take the super-express Nozomi or express Hikari services, which make fewer stops, although the Nozomi requires paying a supplement under the Japan Rail Pass while the Kodama and Hikari do not, making these services an affordable, but slower, alternative.

== Services ==
Kodama trains generally run over shorter distances than Nozomi and Hikari trains. Typical Kodama runs include Tokyo - Nagoya / Shin-Osaka, Tokyo - Mishima / Shizuoka / Hamamatsu, Mishima / Shizuoka / Nagoya - Shin-Osaka, and Shin-Osaka / Okayama / Hiroshima - Hakata as well as some shorter late-night runs.

The trainsets used for Kodama service are the same 700 series, and N700 series trains used for the Hikari and Nozomi services. Older 100 series and 300 series trains were also used for Kodama services on the Sanyō Shinkansen until they were withdrawn in 2012. In December 2008, reconfigured 500 series trains entered Kodama service to replace the withdrawn Sanyō Shinkansen 0 series trains. Many Sanyō Shinkansen Kodama services continue to and from Hakataminami on the Hakataminami Line.

Most Kodama trains have both reserved and non-reserved cars; however, some morning Kodama trains to Tokyo and evening trains departing Tokyo have non-reserved cars only to accommodate commuters living in Kanagawa and Shizuoka.

The newest shinkansen trainset, the N700, is currently used on some early morning and late night Kodama runs between Kokura and Hakata stations in Kyushu. All standard-class cars are non-reserved, and, as with all other N700 services, there is no smoking on these trains except in designated on-board smoking rooms.

At most intermediate stations, Kodama trains wait for faster trains, including the Nozomi, Hikari, Sakura, and Mizuho, to pass through before resuming their journeys.

== Stopping patterns (as of January 2024) ==
Kodama trains stop at all stations between Tokyo and Hakata. In order from east to west, this comprises Tōkyō, Shinagawa, Shin-Yokohama, Odawara, Atami, Mishima, Shin-Fuji, Shizuoka, Kakegawa, Hamamatsu, Toyohashi, Mikawa-Anjō, Nagoya, Gifu-Hashima, Maibara, Kyoto, Shin-Ōsaka, Shin-Kōbe, Nishi-Akashi, Himeji, Aioi, Okayama, Shin-Kurashiki, Fukuyama, Shin-Onomichi, Mihara, Higashi-Hiroshima, Hiroshima, Shin-Iwakuni, Tokuyama, Shin-Yamaguchi, Shin-Shimonoseki, Asa, Kokura, and Hakata.

No Kodama service operates the entire distance from Tokyo to Hakata. For this reason, a transfer is required at Shin-Osaka in order to proceed in either direction. Also, Kodama service to Shin-Osaka and further on are not synchronised and will generally require a wait of between 30 and 45 minutes depending on direction.

== Rolling stock ==
- 500 series 8-car V sets
- 700-7000 series 8-car E sets
- N700 series 8-car S/R
- N700A series 16-car X/K sets, modified from Z/N sets
  - 8-car P sets modified from K sets began service on 12 September 2025.
- N700S series 16-car J/H sets
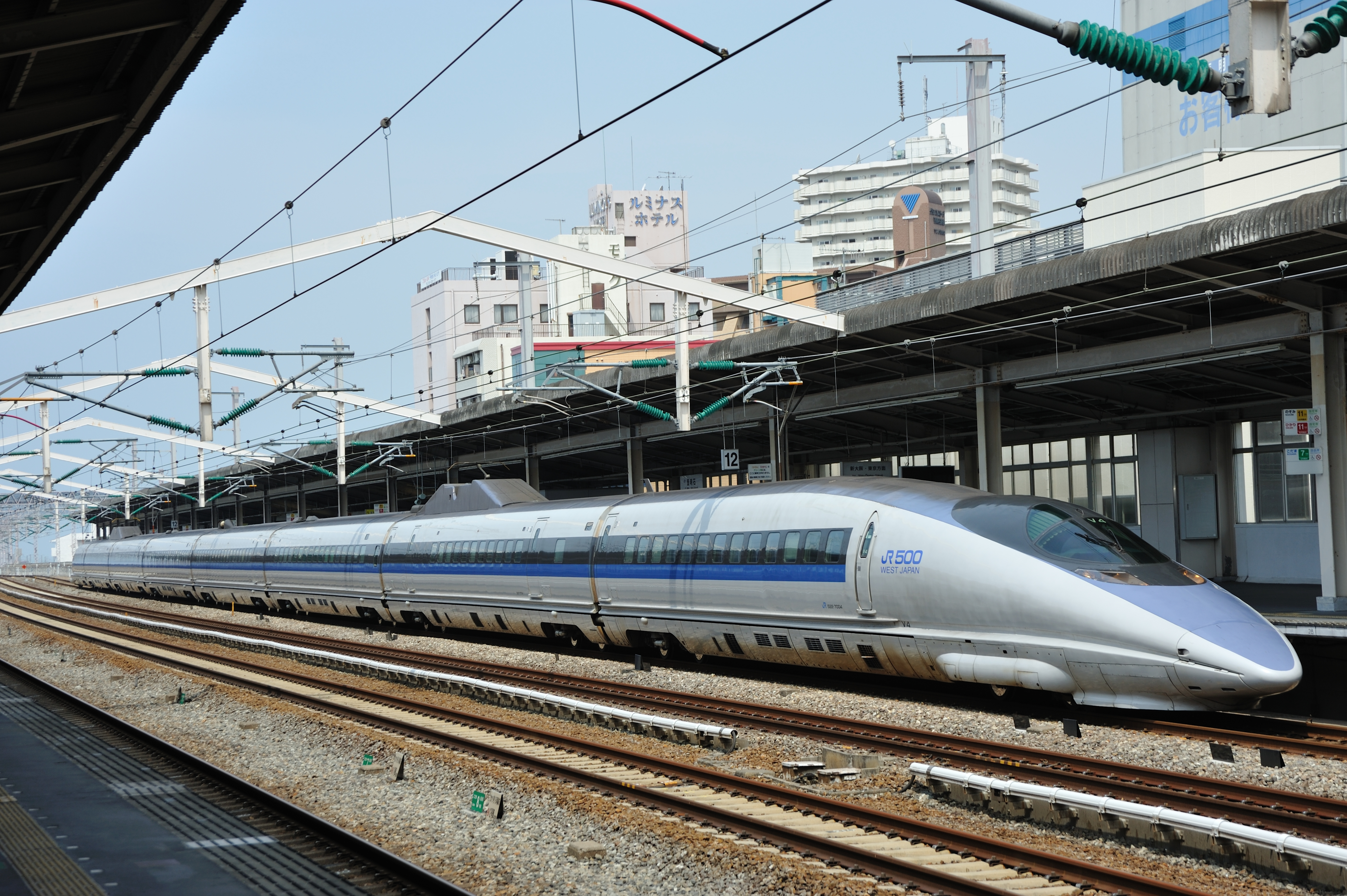
JR West 500 series Kodama, August 2010

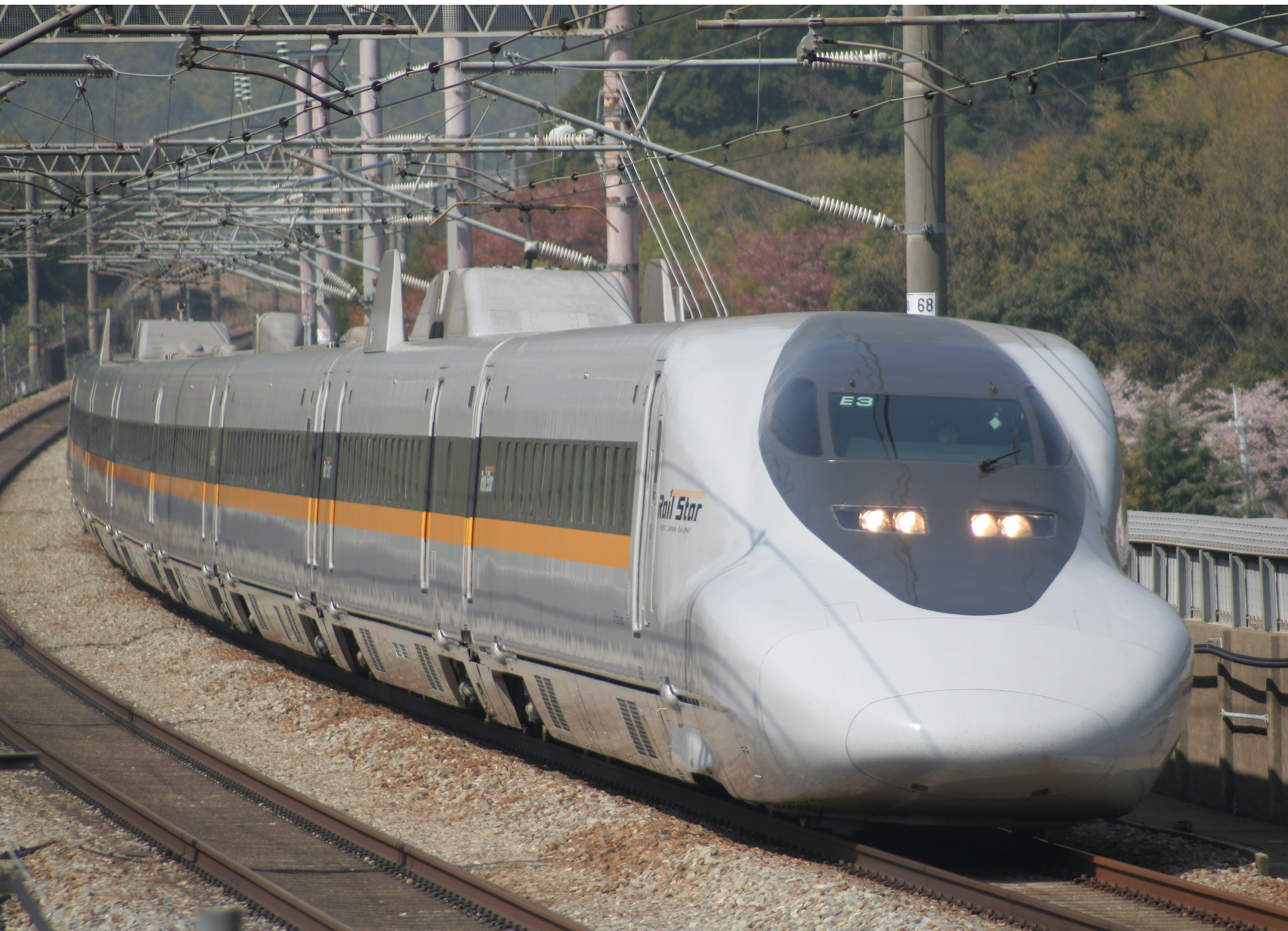
JR West 700 series Hikari Rail Star, April 2009

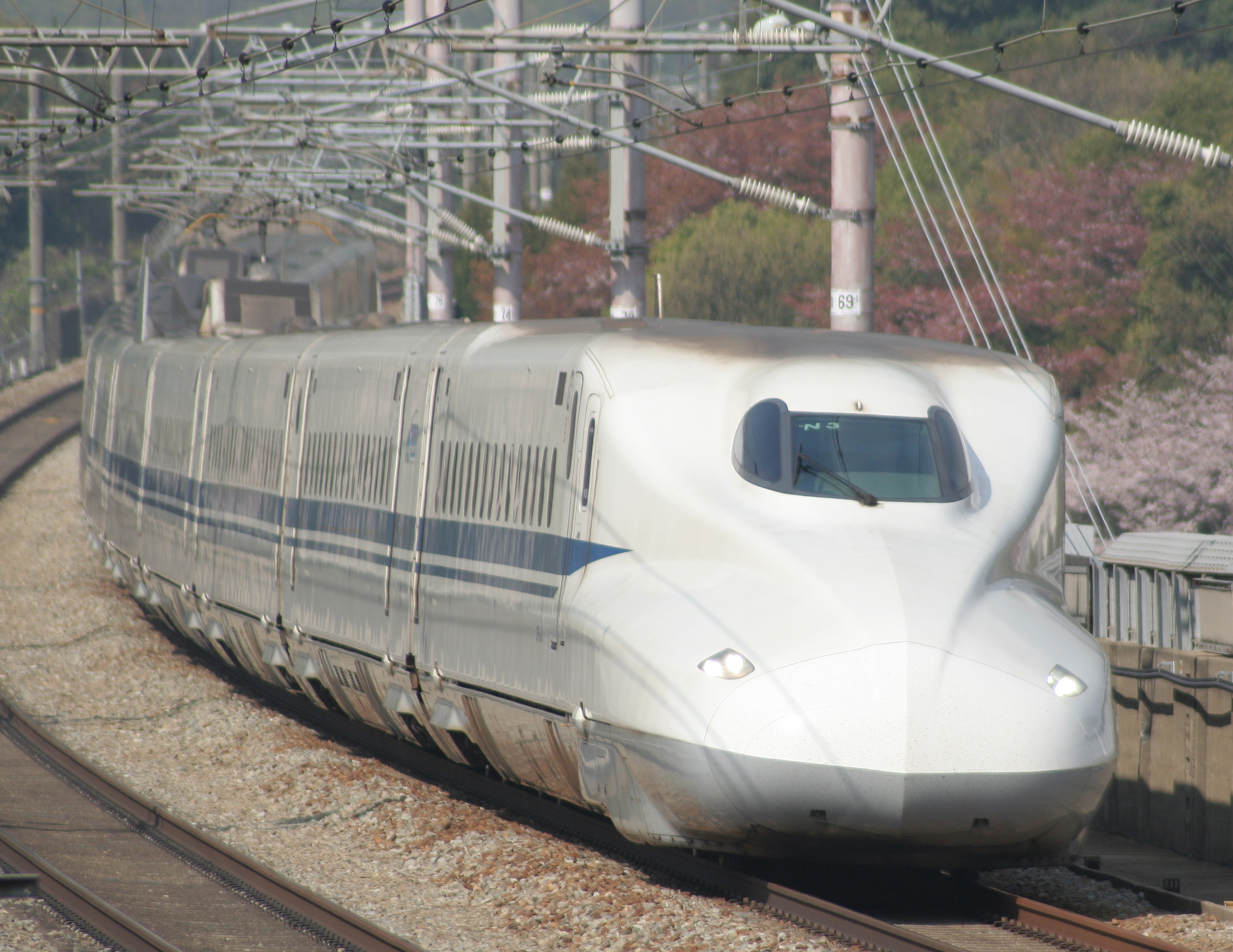
JR West N700 series, April 2009

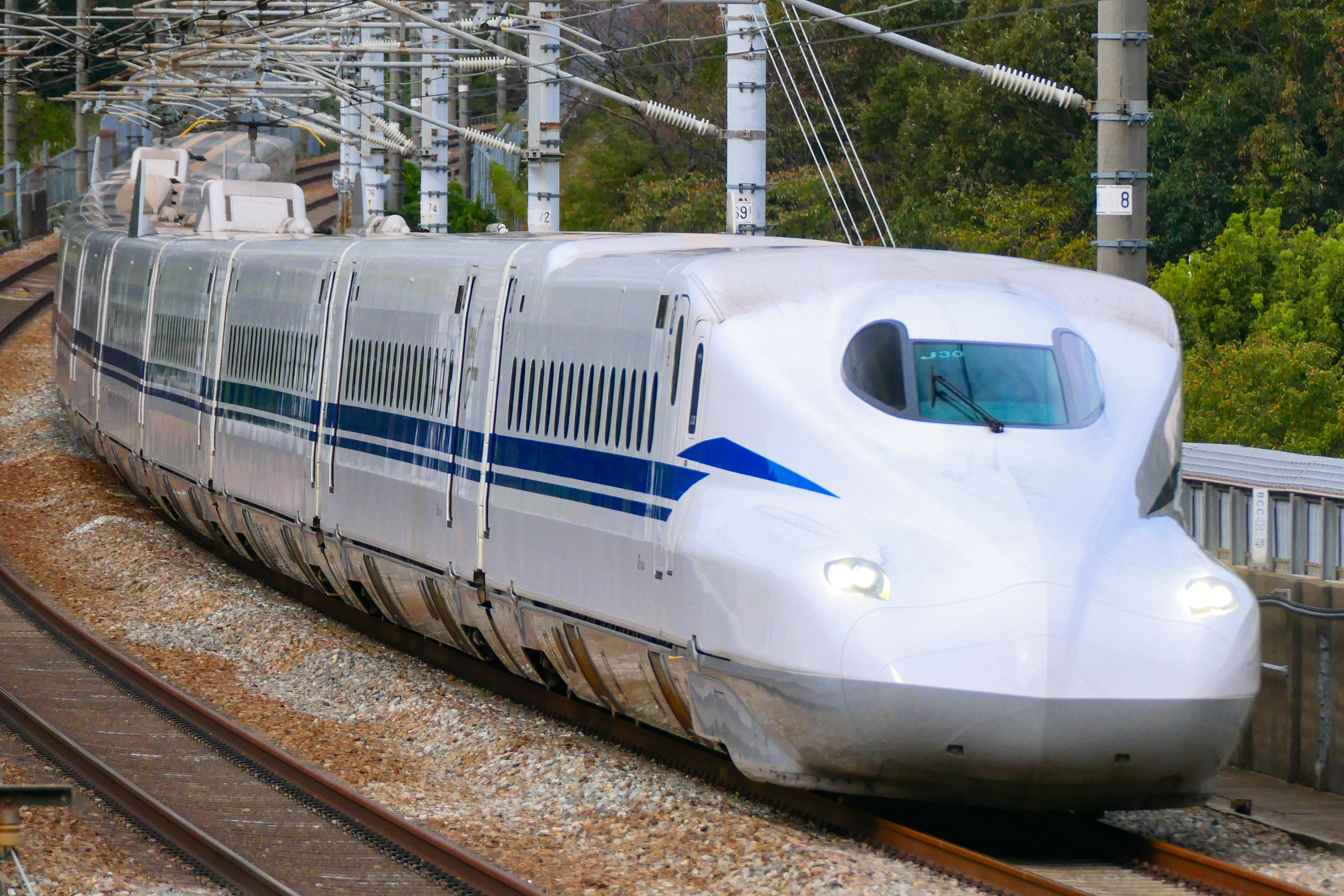
JR Central N700S series, September 2022

=== Former rolling stock ===
- 0 series
- 100 series
- 300 series
- 500 series 16-car W sets
- 700-0 series
- 700-3000 series
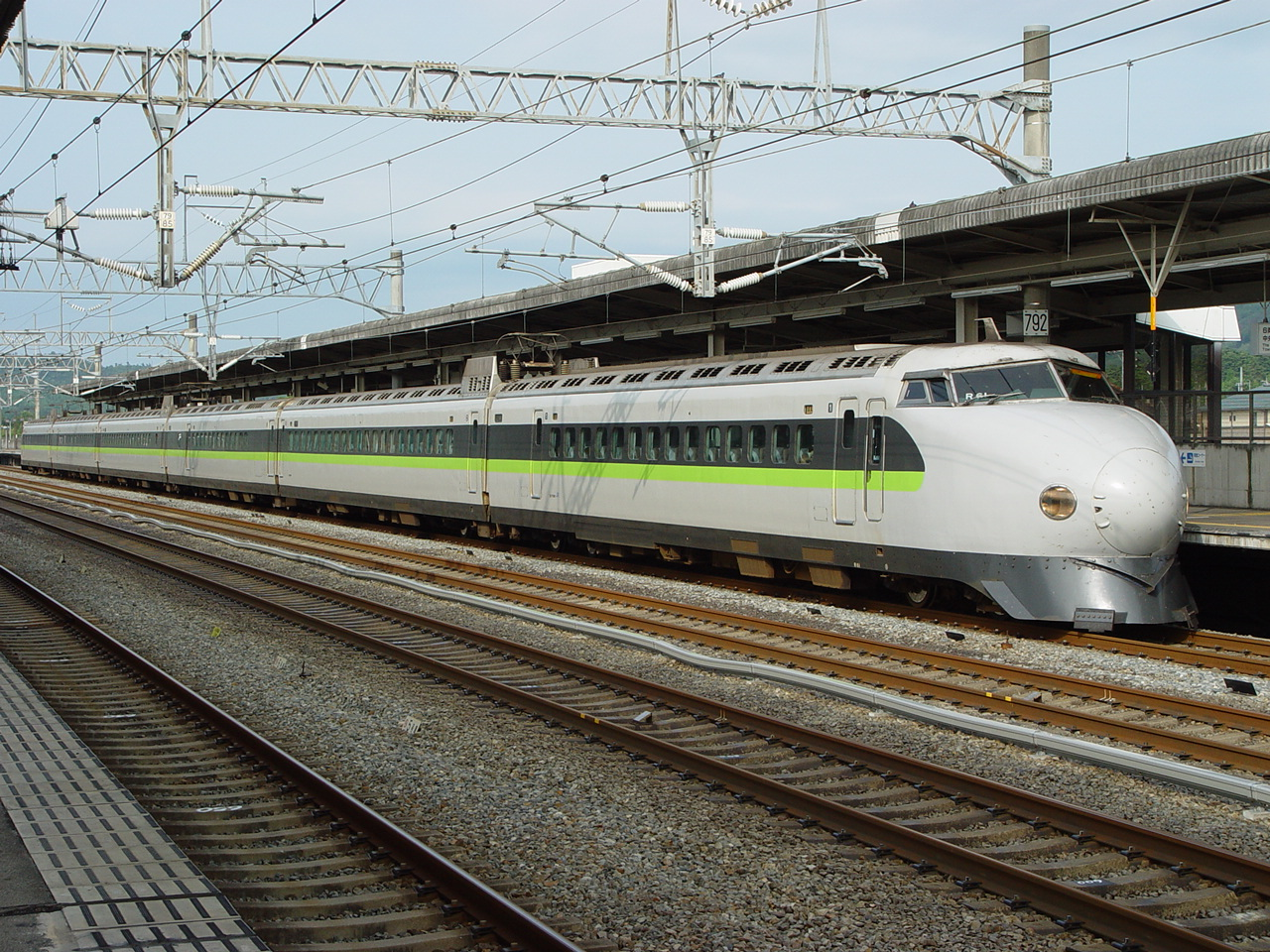
JR West 0 series at Higashi-Hiroshima Station, July 2003

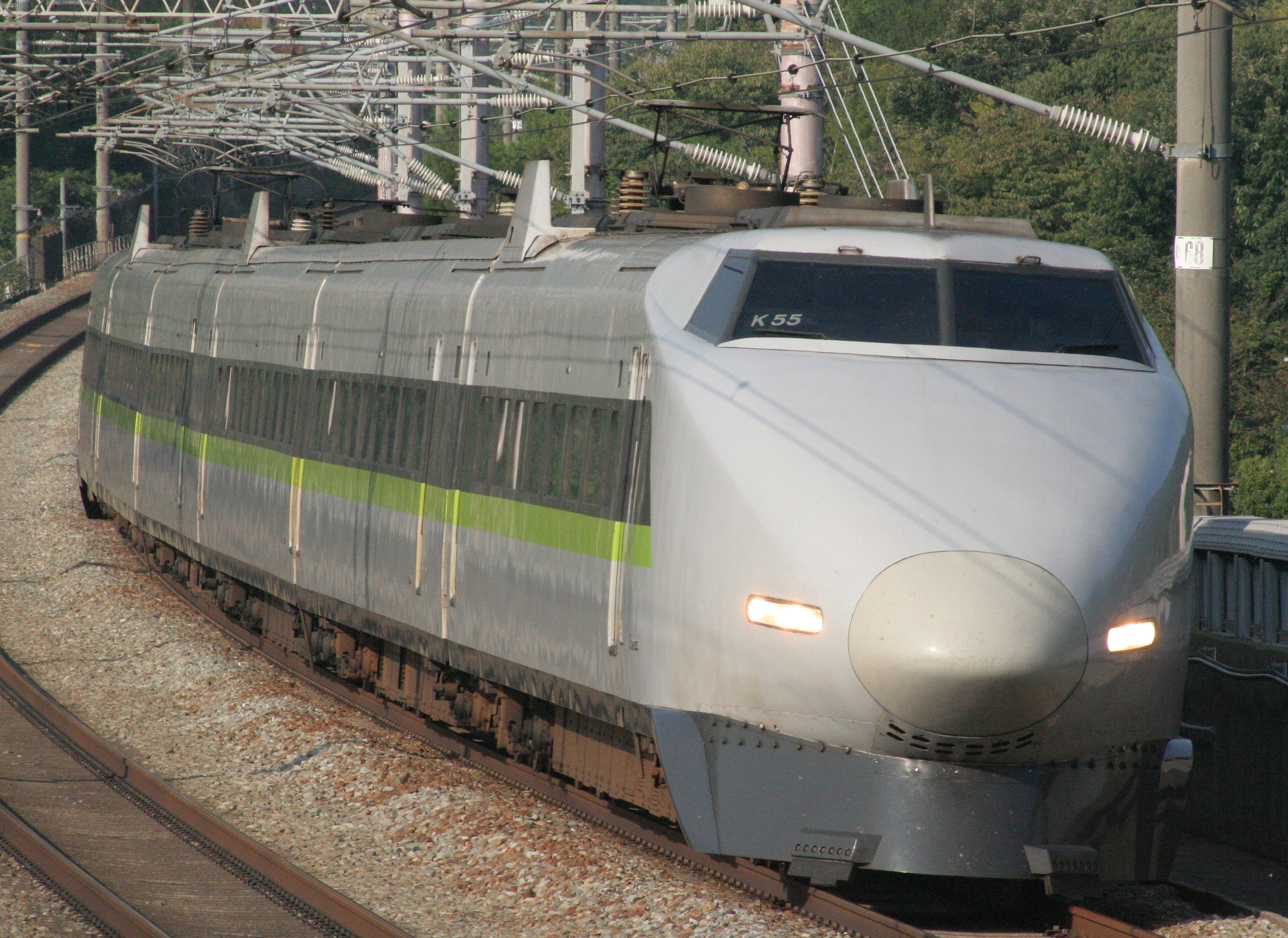
JR West 100 series, October 2008

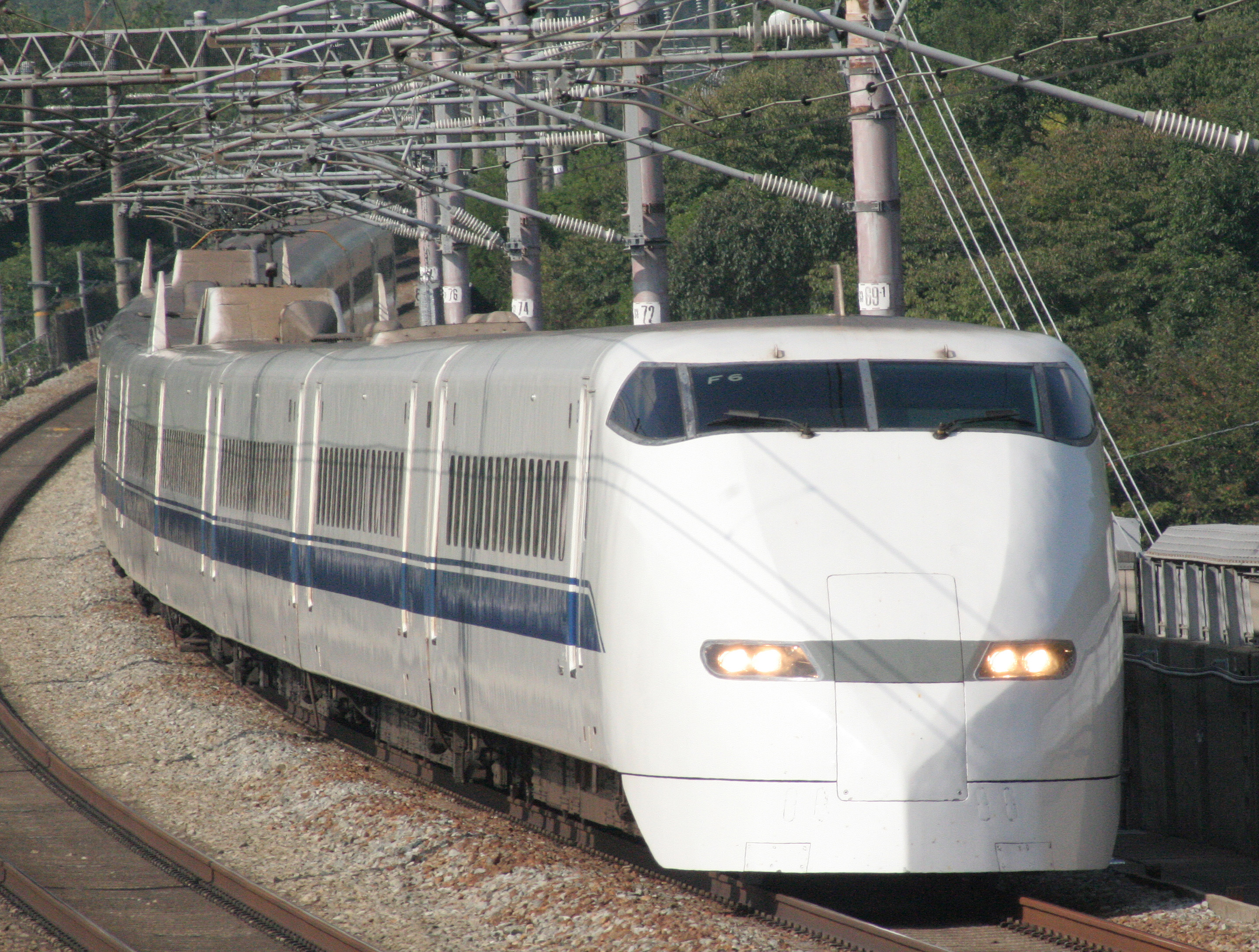
JR West 300 series, October 2008

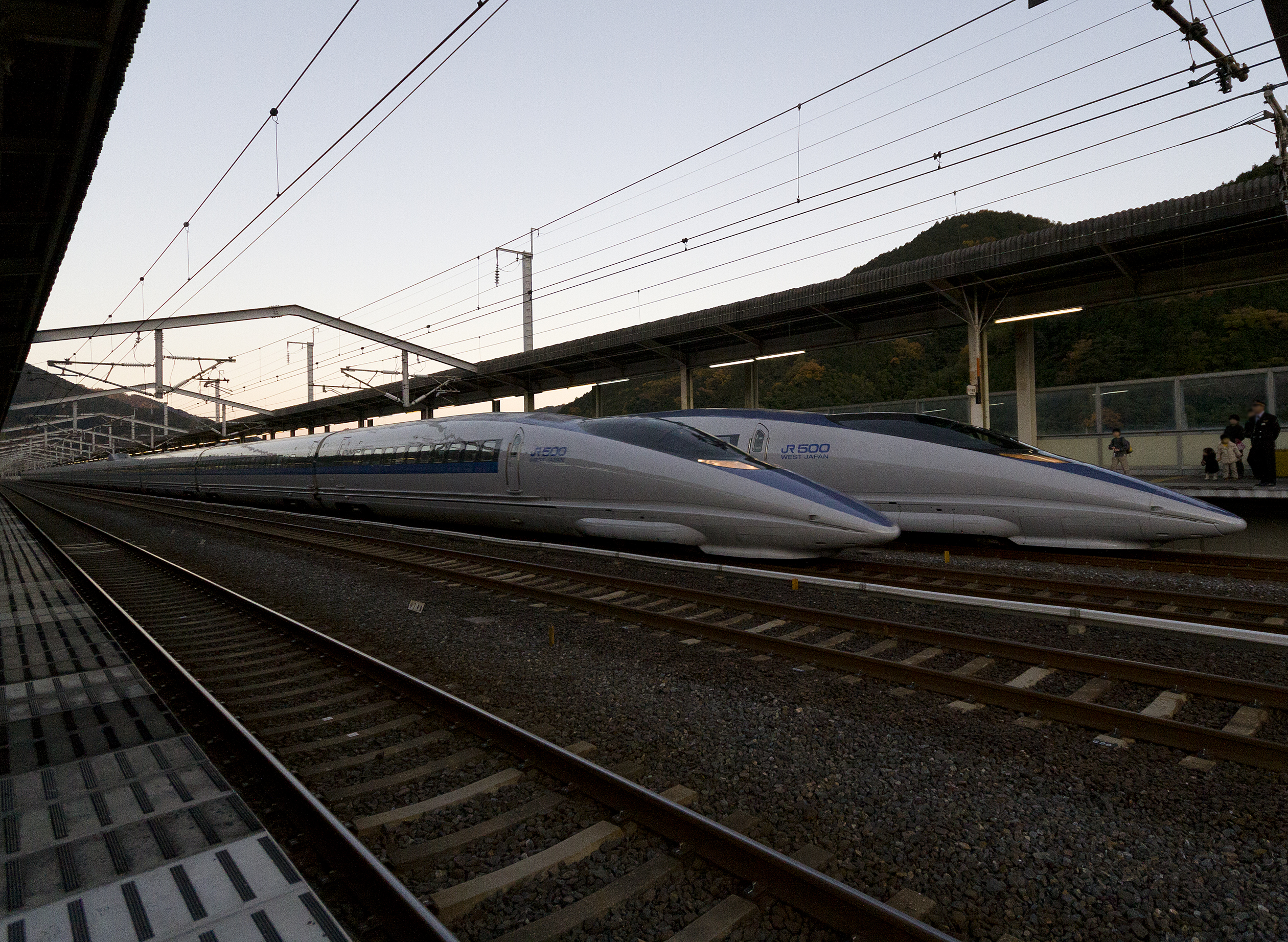
JR West 500 series set W7 (left) on the Nozomi 29 service passing set W8 (right) on the Kodama 697 service at Shin-Iwakuni Station, November 2008

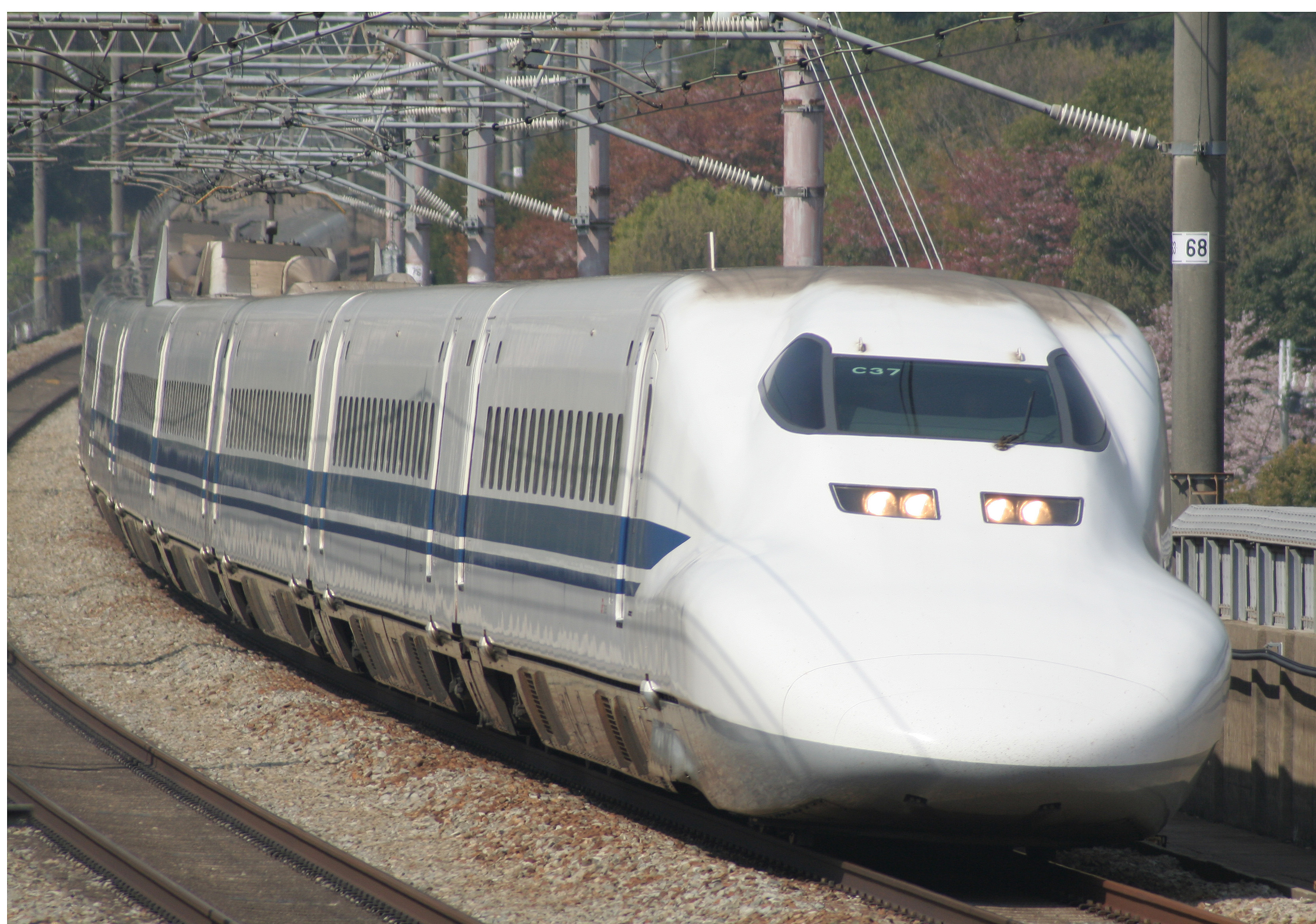
JR Central 700 series, April 2009

==== Pre-Shinkansen ====
- 151 series

== Formations ==
=== N700 series (16 cars) ===
←Hakata								Tokyo→
1	2	3	4	5	6	7	8	9	10	11	12	13	14	15	16
NR	NR	NR	NR	NR	NR	R	G	G	G	R	R	R	NR	NR	NR

=== 500 series (eight cars) ===
←Hakata				Shin-Osaka→
1	2	3	4	5	6	7	8
NR	NR	NR	NR	NR	R	NR	NR

=== N700 series (eight cars) ===
←Hakata				Shin-Osaka→
1	2	3	4	5	6		7	8
NR	NR	NR	NR	R	R	G	NR	NR

=== 700 series (eight cars) ===
←Hakata				Shin-Osaka→
1	2	3	4	5	6	7	8
NR	NR	NR	NR	NR	NR	NR	C

- G: Green car (first class) (reserved seating)
- R: Standard class reserved seating
- C: Standard class reserved seating + compartments
- NR: Standard class non-reserved seating

== History ==
=== Limited express Kodama ===
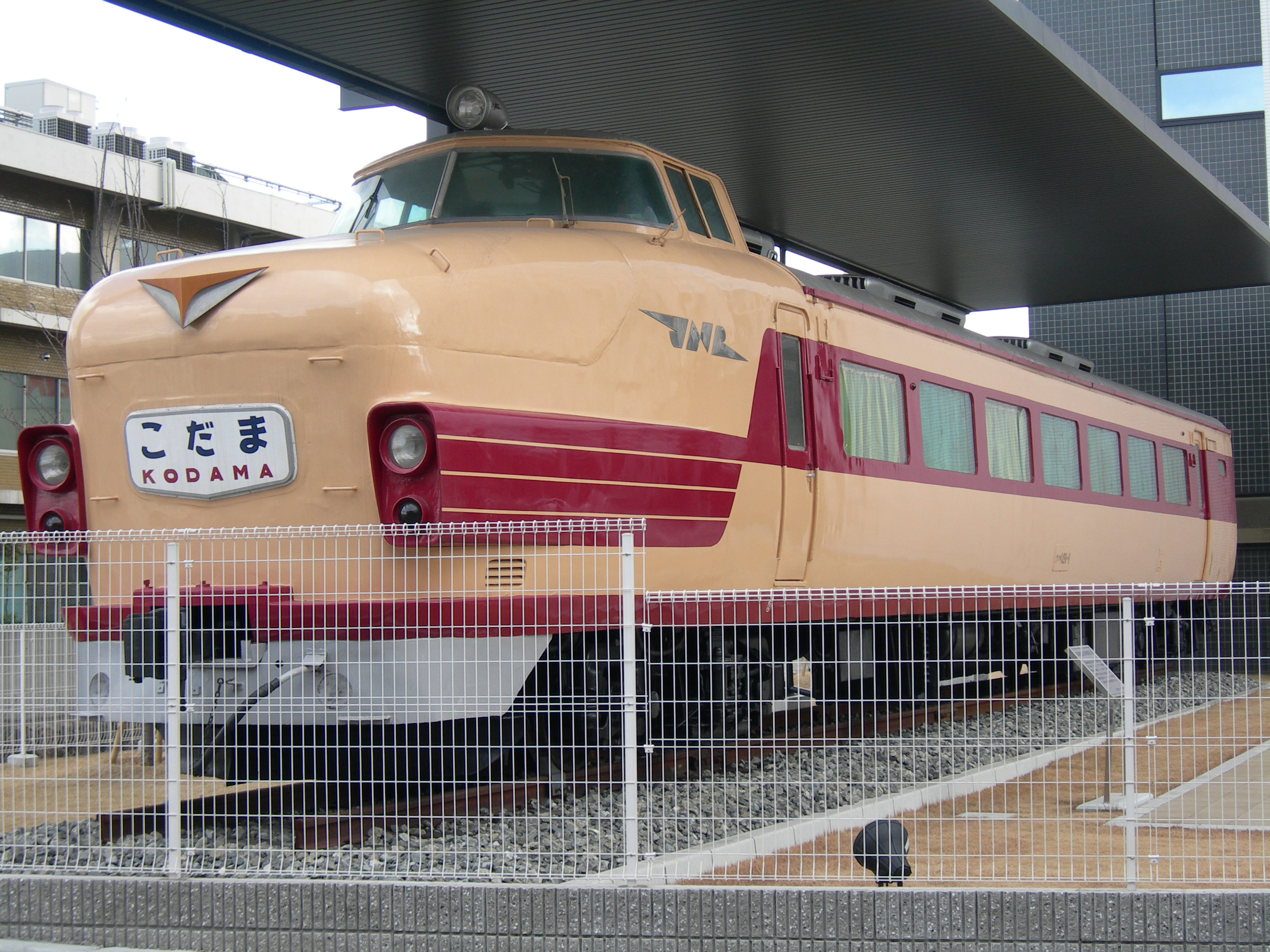
A preserved 181 series car (original 151 series car)

Kodama debuted as a limited express service on the Tokaido Main Line on 1 November 1958. Services used 151 series trainsets. This was the first EMU train service of the Japanese National Railways classified as a limited express, the highest (fastest) of train types on the national railway system. The train travelled between Tokyo Station and Osaka Station in six hours and 50 minutes and first enabled passengers to go and return between the two cities in one day. This is why the train was named Kodama, or echo.

A narrow gauge world speed record of 163 km/h was established by a 151 series Kodama trainset on 31 July 1959. The conventional Kodama train ran until 30 September 1964, the day before Kodama debuted on the Shinkansen.

=== Shinkansen Kodama ===
The Shinkansen Kodama services began on 1 October 1964, operating between Tokyo and Shin-Osaka.

From the start of the revised timetable on 17 March 2012, the remaining 100 series K sets were withdrawn from Kodama services, with services operated by 8-car 700 series E sets becoming entirely non-smoking. On-board trolley refreshment services were also discontinued on all JR Central Kodama services from the same date. Also, some of the 16-car 500 series that used to run as the Nozomi service were cut short to eight cars to run as the Kodama service.

In an announcement by JR Central, JR West, and JR Kyushu made on 17 October 2023, the companies stated that all onboard smoking rooms on the Tokaido, San'yo, and Kyushu Shinkansen trains would be discontinued by Q2 2024; this took effect on 16 March 2024.

== See also ==
- List of named passenger trains of Japan
