= 100 Series Shinkansen =

Japanese high-speed train type

100 series
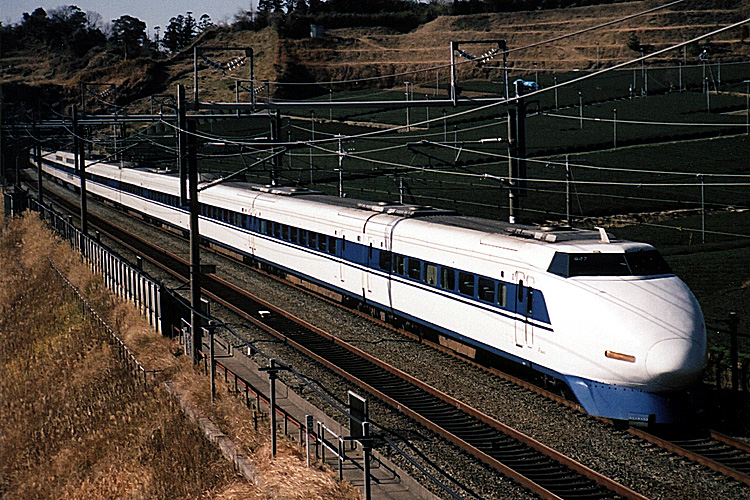
- 100 series train on the Tokaido Shinkansen
- In service: 1 October 1985 – 16 March 2012 (26 years, 167 days)
- Manufacturers: Hitachi; Kawasaki Heavy Industries; Kinki Sharyo; Nippon Sharyo; Tokyu Car Corporation
- Constructed: 1984–1992
- Refurbished: 2000–2004
- Scrapped: 1999–2012
- Number built: 1,056 vehicles (66 sets)
- Number preserved: 3 vehicles
- Predecessor: 0 series
- Successor: 300 series
- Formation: 4, 6, 12 or 16 cars per trainset
- Fleet numbers: X1-X7; G1-G50; V1-V9; K51-K60; P1-P12
- Capacity: 4-car P sets 250; 6-car K sets 394; 12-car G sets 1,031 (68 Green + 963 Standard); 16-car X sets 1,277 (124 Green + 1,153 Standard); 16-car V sets 1,285 (126 Green + 1,159 Standard); 16-car G sets 1,321 (168 Green + 1,153 Standard)
- Operators: JNR (1985–1987); JR Central (1987–2003); JR-West (1989–2012)
- Depot: Hakata
- Lines served: Tokaido Shinkansen (1985-2003); Sanyo Shinkansen (1985-2012); Hakata-Minami Line (2000-2012)

Specifications
- Car body construction: Steel
- Car length: 25 m (82 ft 0 in) (intermediate cars); 26.05 m (85 ft 6 in) (end cars)
- Width: 3,383 mm (11 ft 1.2 in)
- Height: 4,000 mm (13 ft 1 in); 4,488 mm (14 ft 8.7 in) (Bilevel car)
- Doors: Two per side
- Maximum speed: 220 km/h (137 mph); 230 km/h (143 mph) (former V sets)
- Traction system: Thyristor drive
- Acceleration: 1.6 km/(h⋅s) (0.99 mph/s) for the former V sets)
- Deceleration: 2.6 km/(h⋅s) (1.6 mph/s)
- Electric system: 25 kV AC, 60 Hz, overhead catenary
- Current collection: Pantograph
- Bogies: DT202 (motored), TR7000 (trailer)
- Safety system: ATC-1
- Track gauge: 1,435 mm (4 ft 8 1/2 in) standard gauge

The 100 series (100系, Hyaku-kei) was a Japanese Shinkansen high-speed electric multiple unit which operated between 1985 and 2012 on the Tokaido Shinkansen and Sanyo Shinkansen high-speed lines. They were introduced after the 200 series trains, but their numbering is such because in the days of Japanese National Railways (JNR), Shinkansen types running east of Tokyo were given even numbers and those west of Tokyo odd numbers, hence they were given the next odd number in line after 0, 100. The last remaining examples of the type were withdrawn from service following the last runs on 16 March 2012.

== Overview ==
As a full-scale redesign of the Tokaido-Sanyo Shinkansen, a total of 1,056 cars were manufactured and put into service between 1985 and 1992, consisting of 66 16-car sets. The train was the first to incorporate the double-decker cars used in Kintetsu Railway's Vista Cars and in railways in Europe and the United States, and was the first to be used in JNR and Shinkansen trains, leading to increased seating capacity and improved service, which helped promote the Shinkansen and improved its image. In terms of interior and technology, many of the equipment and technologies were later installed in Shinkansen trains produced thereafter.

The train capacity and manufacturing costs were set to be the same as those of the 0 Series, and the aim was to shorten travel times while minimising improvements to ground facilities. In addition, it was developed with the intention of being a "symbol of JNR reform," and the development goal was set to be "customers first, crew members second".

This model was the mainstay on the Tokaido and Sanyo Shinkansen lines from the end of the JNR era until the launch of JR, but with the introduction of newer 300 and 700 series equipment, it was withdrawn from service on the Tokaido Shinkansen on 16 September 2003, and from service on the Sanyo Shinkansen on 16 March 2012.

== Design ==
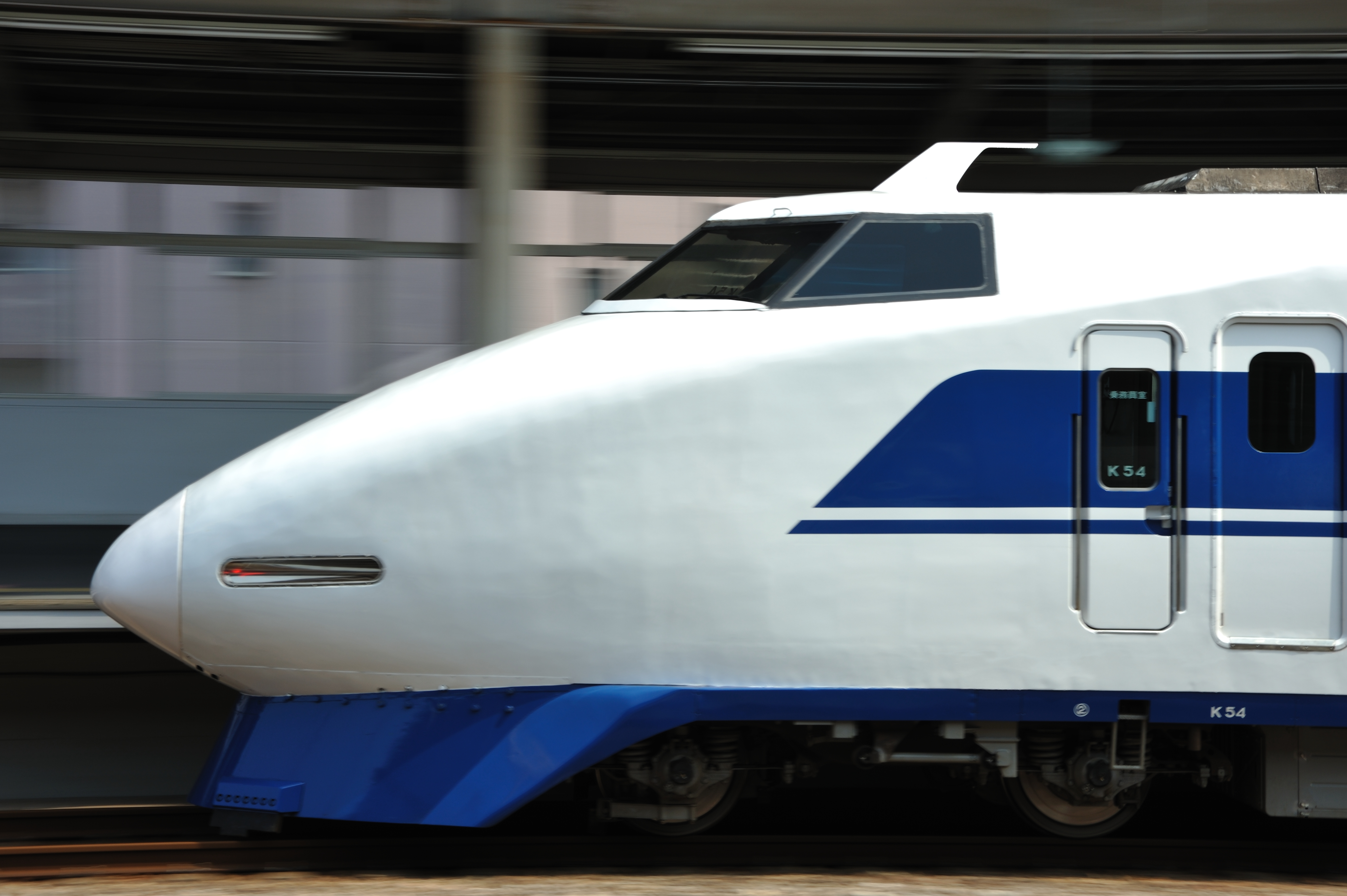
This style was called "shark nose"

They differed visibly from the earlier 0 series in that the nose profile was more pointed. Another less obvious difference with the 16-car sets was that not all the cars were powered; the driving cars on each end were unpowered, as were the two bi-level centre cars. Some later production sets had powered driving cars and four unpowered bi-level trailers in the middle instead. The bi-level trailer cars contained a combination of restaurant cars, and first class compartments, or open-plan first class seating and first class compartments, or open-plan first class seating and refreshment cars. The arrangement of the lights in the signal lights has been changed from two vertical lights in the 0-series to two horizontal lights, giving it a long, narrow shape. This design was proposed by Kinki Sharyo and adopted. When the front signal lights are on, they remain on, and when the rear signal lights are on, a red filter is automatically attached, making them appear to be on in red.

The external livery was white (White No. 3) and blue (Blue No. 20).

Following their removal from front-line service, 100 series sets were later reformed into shorter four- and six-car sets for the slower Kodama services on the Sanyo Shinkansen line. These four- and six-car trains did not have bi-level cars.

== Variants ==
=== Pre-series unit ===
Originally numbered X0, the pre-series set X1 was delivered in 1985, with test running commencing from 27 March that year. The X1 set entered revenue service for passenger evaluation trials on the Hikari services from 1 October 1985. This unit differed externally from later production units in having small windows aligned with each seating bay, and also had a slanting headlight arrangement. The type 116 Green (first class) car formed as car 10 initially included one two-seat and two single-seat compartments, but these were removed when the set was modified to full-production standard in 1986.

Set X0 was formed as shown below, with car 1 at the Hakata end.

Car No.	1	2	3	4	5	6	7	8	9	10	11	12	13	14	15	16
Designation	Tc	M'	M	M'	M	M'	M5	TDD	TsD	Ms'	M7	M'	M	M'	M	T'c
Numbering	123-9001	126-9001	125-9001	126-9002	125-9002	126-9003	125-9501	168-9001	149-9001	116-9001	125-9701	126-9004	125-9003	126-9005	125-9004	124-9001

Set X1 was withdrawn in March 2000.

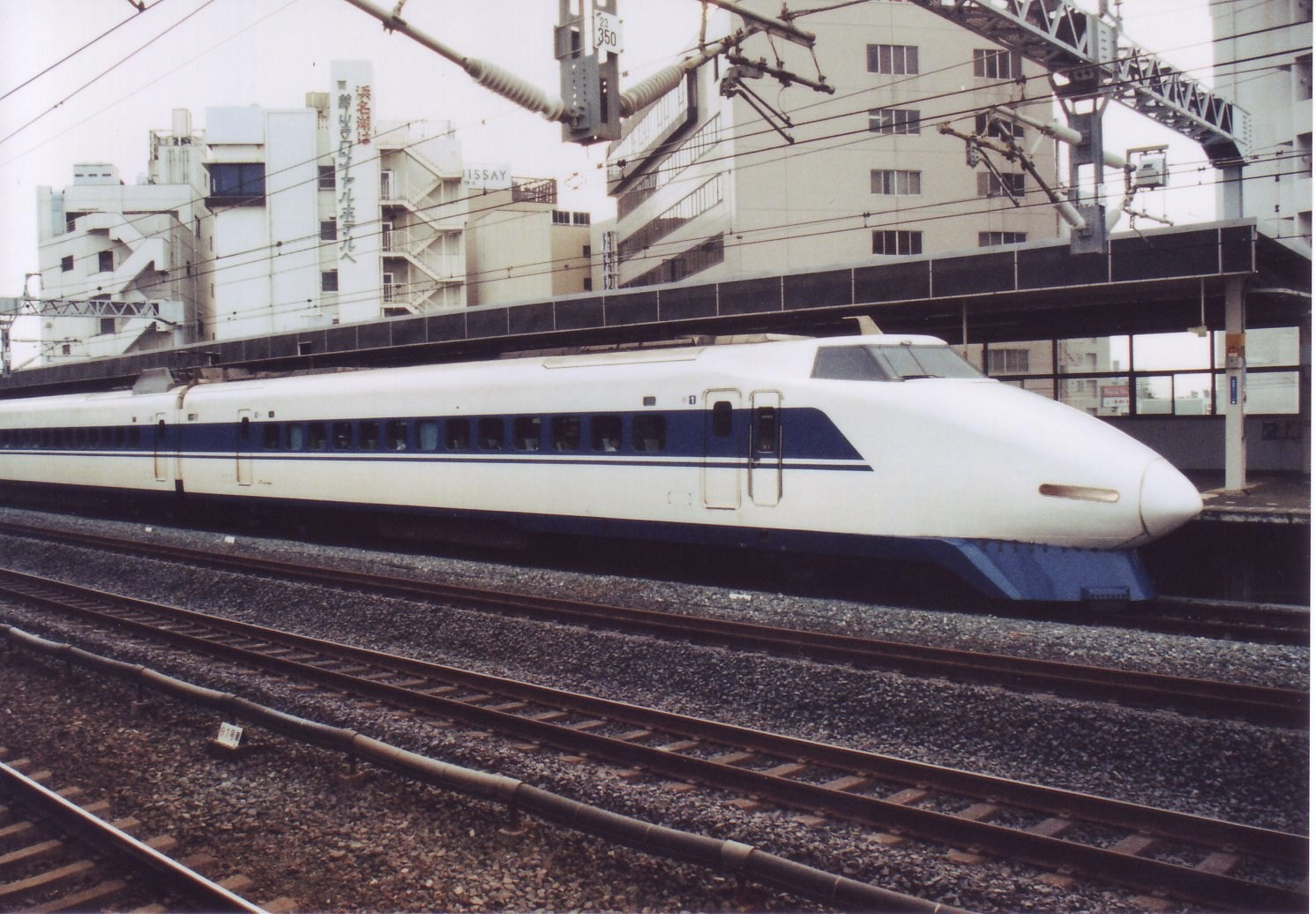
Pre-series unit X1 on a Kodama service in October 1998

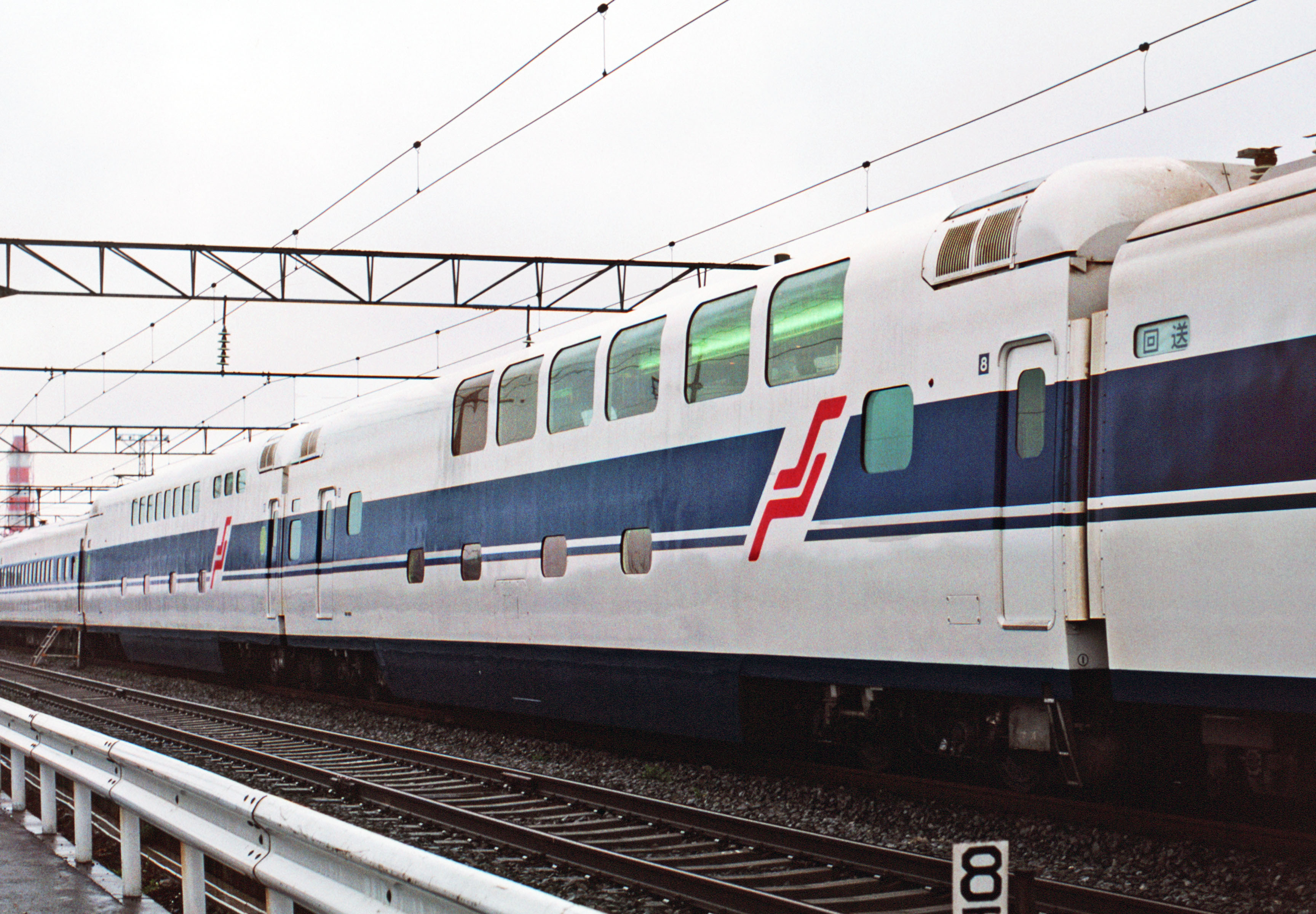
Bilevel dining car 168-9001 carrying the original "NS" ("New Shinkansen") logo stickers in September 1985

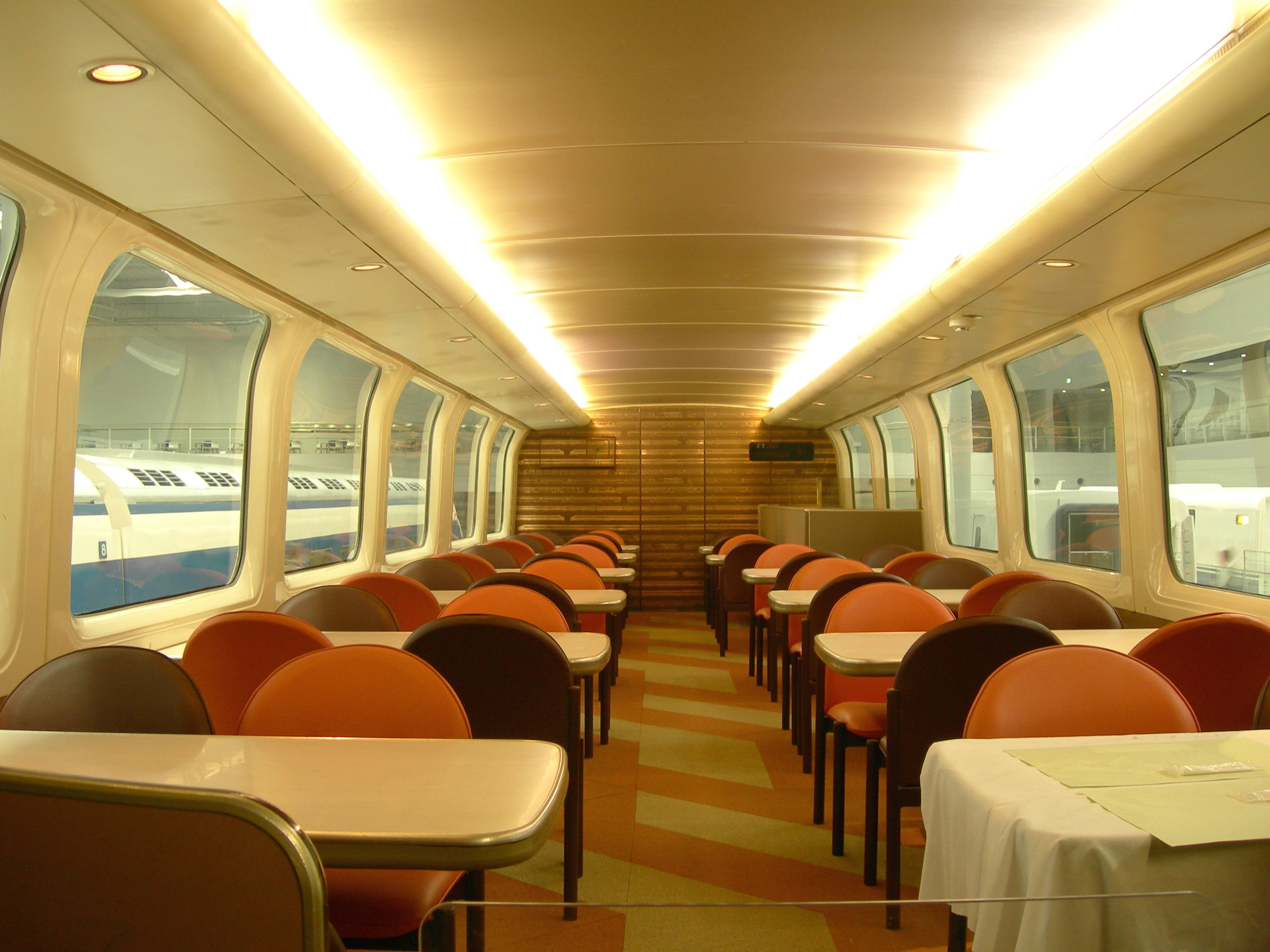
Interior of bilevel restaurant car 168-9001 preserved at SCMaglev and Railway Park in April 2011

=== 16-car X sets ===
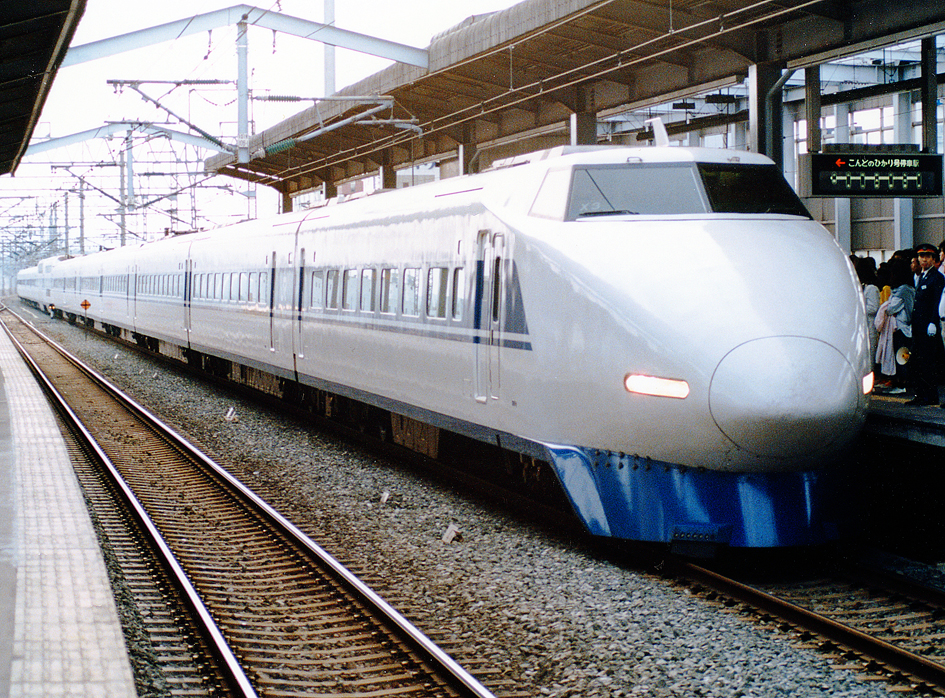
Set X3 in 1987

Following passenger evaluation trials with the pre-series set X1, a total of seven X sets were built for use on Tokaido and Sanyo Shinkansen Hikari services. The first four production units entered service from 13 June 1986 as 12-car sets without bilevel trailer cars, numbered G1 to G4, and were used on Tokaido Kodama services until October in the same year. These sets were formed as shown below.

Car No.	1	2	3	4	5	6	7	8	9	10	11	12
Designation	Tc	M'	M	M'	M7	M'	M5	Ms'	M	M'	M	T'c
Numbering	123	126	125	126	125-700	126	125-500	116	125	126	125	124

Cars 2, 4, 6, 8, and 10 were each fitted with cross-arm pantographs.

These units were subsequently renumbered as 16-car sets X2 to X5 with the inclusion of bilevel trailer cars, and were introduced on Hikari services from November 1986.

The noticeable difference over previous (0 series and 200 series) shinkansen designs was the inclusion of two bilevel trailer cars in the centre of the formation. The type 168 car had a restaurant area on the upper deck with kitchen facilities and a small buffet counter on the lower deck. The adjacent type 149 car provided private compartments for Green class passengers on the lower deck, with open-plan green car accommodation on the upper deck.

From March 1998, the X sets were redeployed to Tokaido Kodama services. The restaurant cars were no longer used, and fittings were subsequently removed. The fleet of X sets contained the oldest members of the 100 series fleet, and the first withdrawals started in August 1999. From the new timetable change of 2 October 1999, X sets were no longer assigned to regular workings, with the remaining examples subsequently limited to holiday period extra trains. The last remaining units were withdrawn by April 2000.

==== Formation ====
The 16-car X sets were formed as follows.

Car No.	1	2	3	4	5	6	7	8	9	10	11	12	13	14	15	16
Designation	Tc	M'	M	M'	M	M'	M5	TDD	TsD	Ms'	M7	M'	M	M'	M	T'c
Numbering	123	126	125	126	125	126	125-500	168	149	116	125-700	126	125	126	125	124
Seating capacity	65	100	90	100	90	100	80	44	56	68	73	100	90	100	90	75

Cars 2, 6, and 12 were equipped with cross-arm pantographs. (The pantographs on cars 4, 10, and 14 were removed in 1995.)

=== 16-car G sets ===
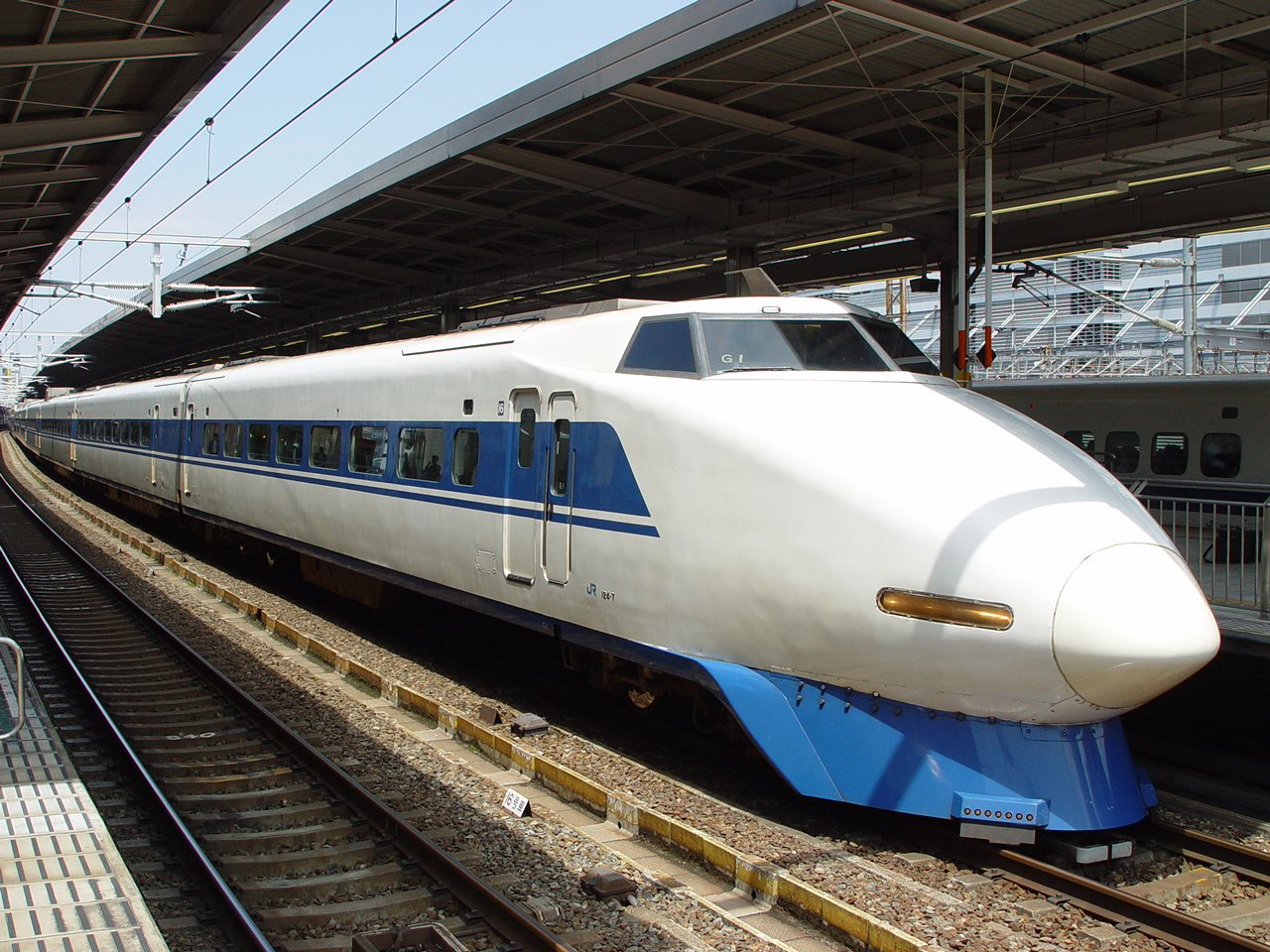
JR-West set G1 on a Kodama service in May 2003

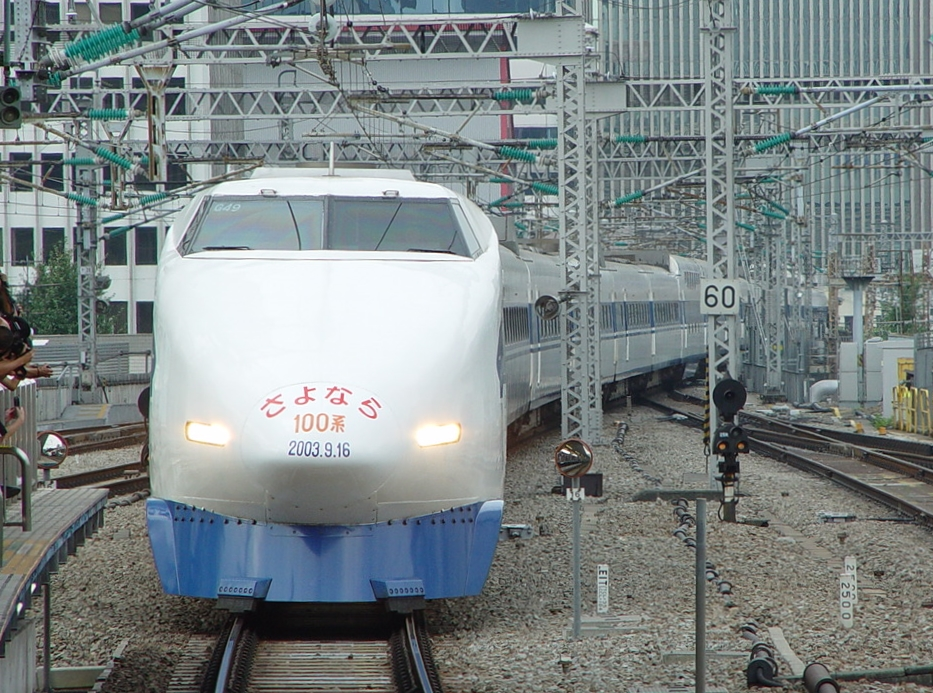
JR Central set G49 on the last day of operations on the Tokaido Shinkansen in September 2003

The G sets were officially classified as "100 series", and 50 units were built from 1988. They differed from the initial X sets in having a type 148 bilevel trailer car in place of the type 168 restaurant car. This had open-plan Green car accommodation on the upper deck, and a self-service cafeteria area on the lower deck. While originally used exclusively on Hikari services, in later years, these units were more commonly seen on Tokaido Kodama services. The last remaining sets owned by JR Central and JR-West were withdrawn in September 2003 before the start of the new Tokaido Shinkansen timetable the following October.

==== Formation ====
The 16-car G sets were formed as follows.

Car No.	1	2	3	4	5	6	7	8	9	10	11	12	13	14	15	16
Designation	Tc	M'	M	M'	M	M'	M5	TsD	TsD	Ms'	M7	M'	M	M'	M	T'c
Numbering	123	126	125	126	125	126	125-500	148	149	116	125-700	126	125	126	125	124
Seating capacity	65	100	90	100	90	100	80	42	58	68	73	100	90	100	90	75

Cars 2, 6, and 12 were equipped with cross-arm pantographs.

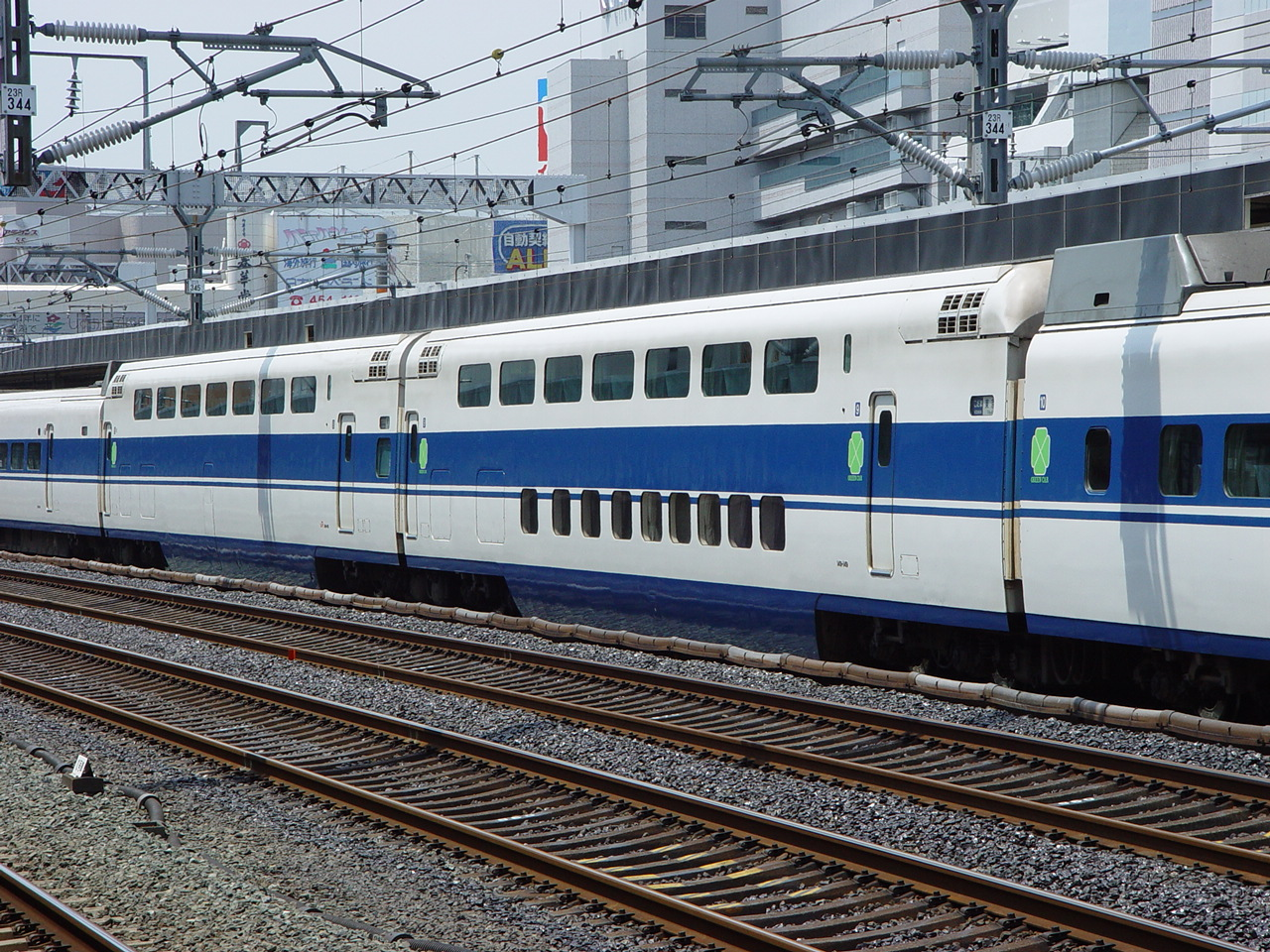
Bilevel cars 8 and 9 of set G49 in April 2003

=== 16-car V sets (100-3000 series) ===
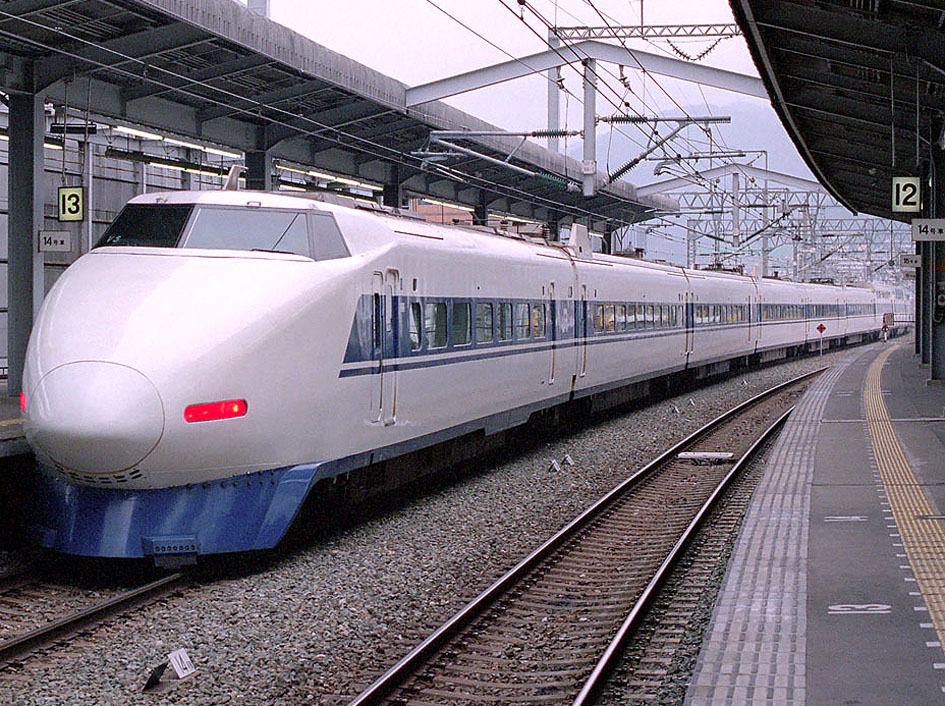
Set V5 on a Grand Hikari service

The nine V sets (also referred to as "100N") operated by JR-West included four bilevel trailer cars, which provided 2+2 standard class reserved seating accommodation on the lower decks, and restaurant and Green class accommodation on the upper decks. These sets originally ran under the marketing name Grand Hikari, but from May 2002 onwards were limited to use on the Sanyo Shinkansen only. The restaurant cars in these units were decommissioned from March 2000. Two V sets (V1, V6) were reformed as new 4-car P sets in 2000 to replace life-expired 0 series Q sets on Sanyo Shinkansen Kodama services, and the remaining sets were subsequently used to donate cars as they were withdrawn. The last operational set, V2 (with four bilevel trailer cars from set V9), was withdrawn after being used on special Sayonara Grand Hikari runs in November 2002.

==== Formation ====
The 16-car V sets were formed as follows.

Car No.	1	2	3	4	5	6	7	8	9	10	11	12	13	14	15	16
Designation	Mc	M'	M	M'	M8	M'	TsD	TDD	TsD	T'sD	M7	M'	M	M'	M	M'c
Numbering	121-3000	126-3000	125-3000	126-3000	125-3000	126-3000	179-3100	168-3000	179-3700	178-3000	125-3700	126-3000	125-3000	126-3000	125-3000	122-3000
Seating capacity	65	100	90	100	90	100	80	44	58	68	73	100	90	100	90	75

Cars 4, 6, 12, and 14 were equipped with cross-arm pantographs.

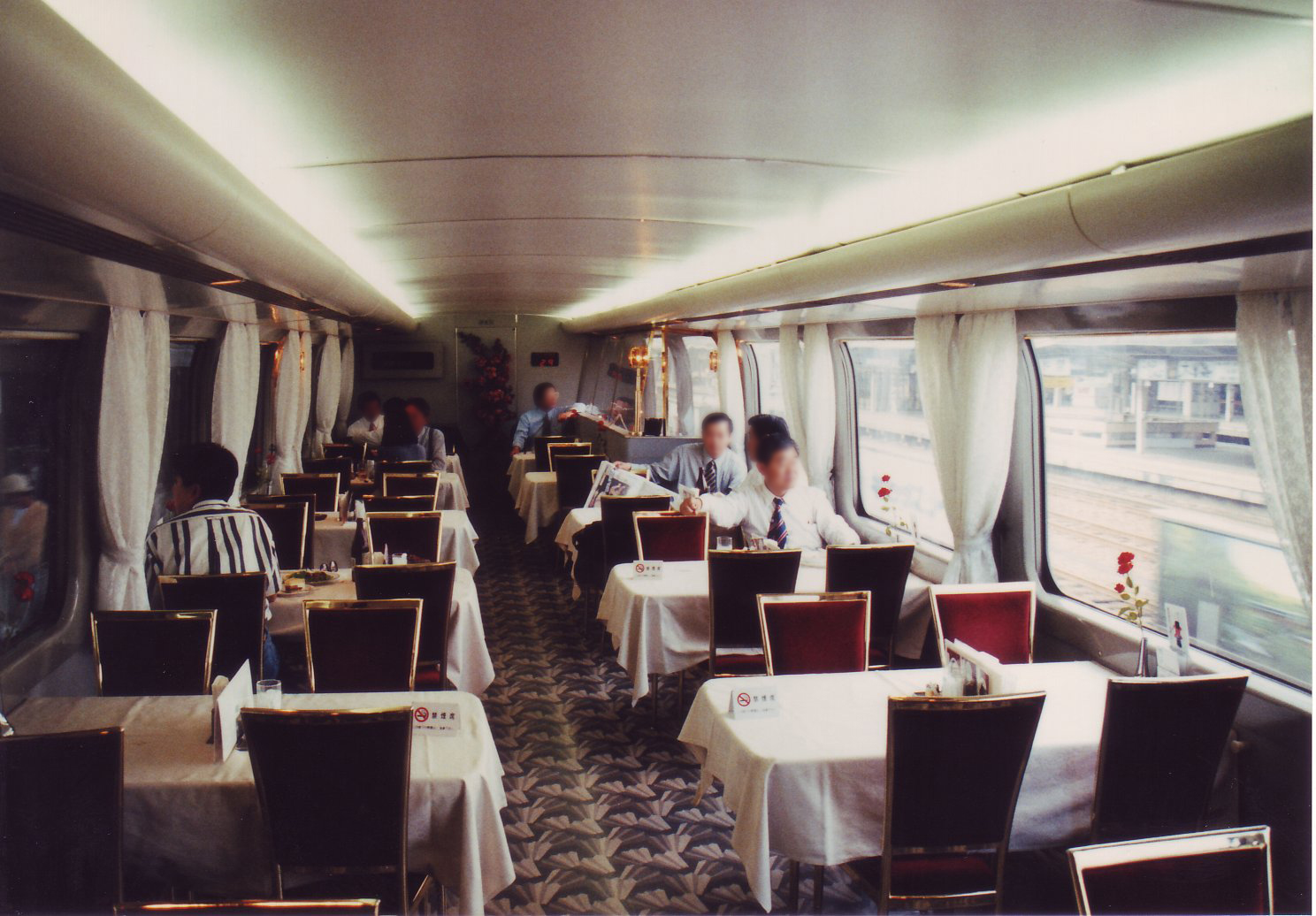
Interior view of 168-3000 restaurant car in July 1999

=== 4-car P sets ===
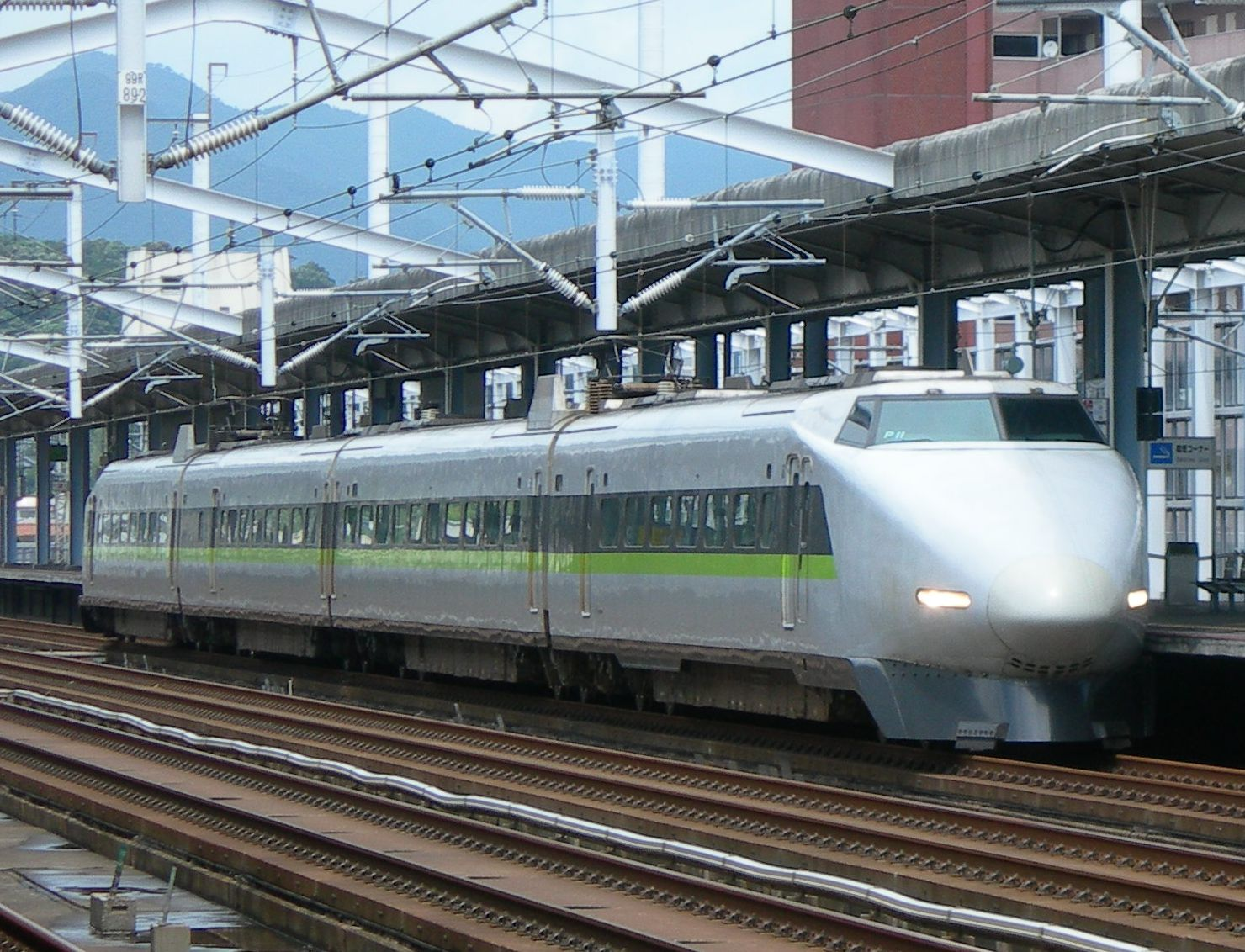
Set P11 in JR-West "Kodama" livery in August 2009

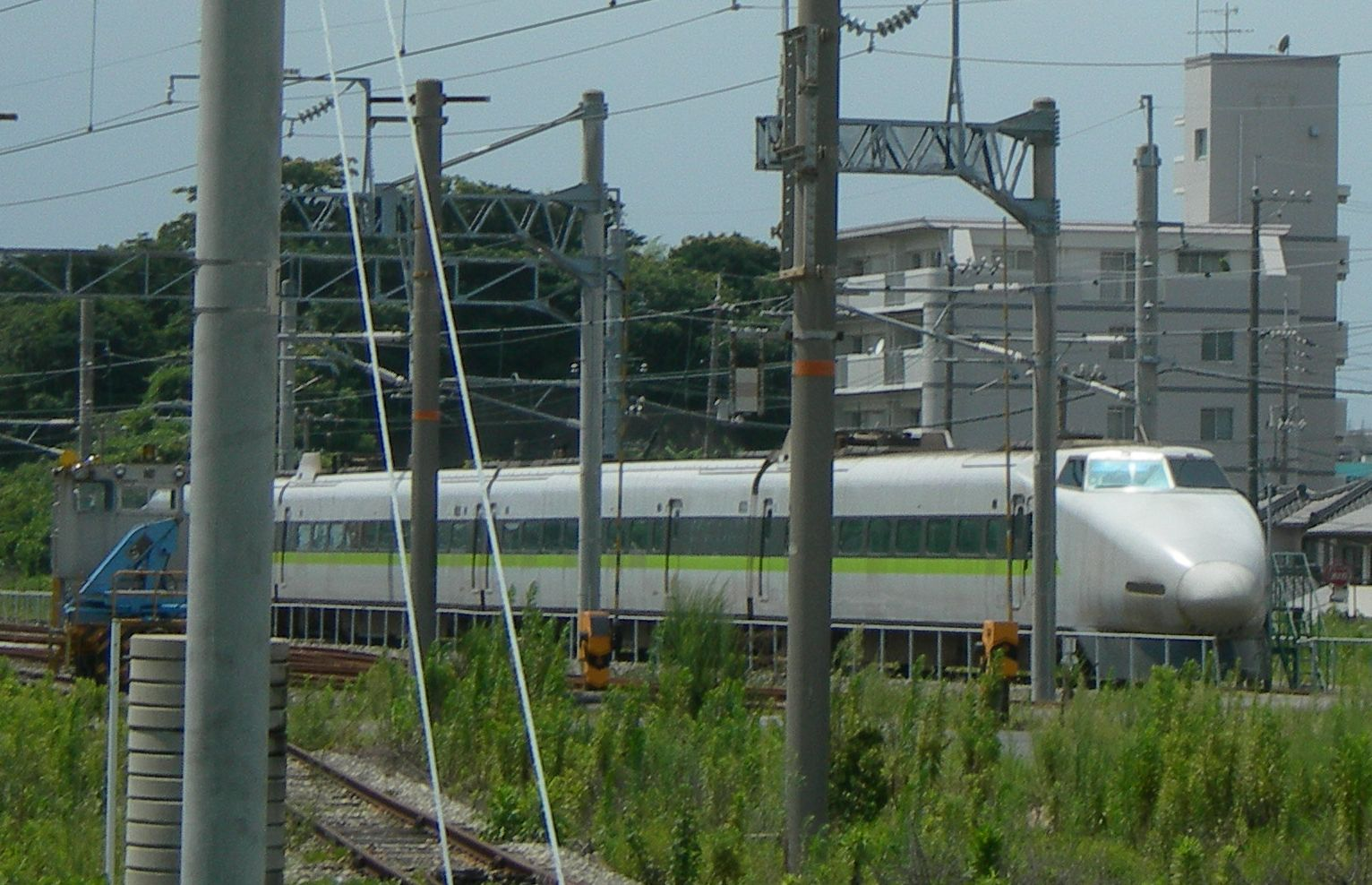
JR-West training set P2 at Shimonoseki in August 2009

The first of two reformed 4-car P sets was introduced on Sanyo Shinkansen Kodama services from October 2000. P1 was reformed from set V1, with the traction motors in the two end cars (renumbered in -5000 series) replaced by those from surplus JR-West G set cars. P2 was reformed from unit V6 in October 2000. Subsequent sets P3 and P4 were formed in 2001 by transplanting the cab sections of surplus non-powered G set cars onto powered intermediate cars renumbered into the 121-5050 and 122-5050 series. Set P1 was the first to be repainted into the new JR-West "fresh green" Kodama livery, in August 2002, and the entire fleet of twelve sets (P1–P12) had been similarly treated by March 2005.

==== Formation ====
Car No.	1	2	3	4
Designation	Mc	M'	M7	M'c
Numbering	121-5000	126-3000	125-3700	122-5000
Seating capacity	52	80	58	60

Cars 2 and 4 were equipped with cross-arm pantographs.

==== Interior ====
The first three sets (P1 to P3) were refurbished in February and March 2002 with 2+2 abreast seating using former West Hikari seats. Sets from P4 onward (formed in August 2001) had 2+2 seating from the outset.

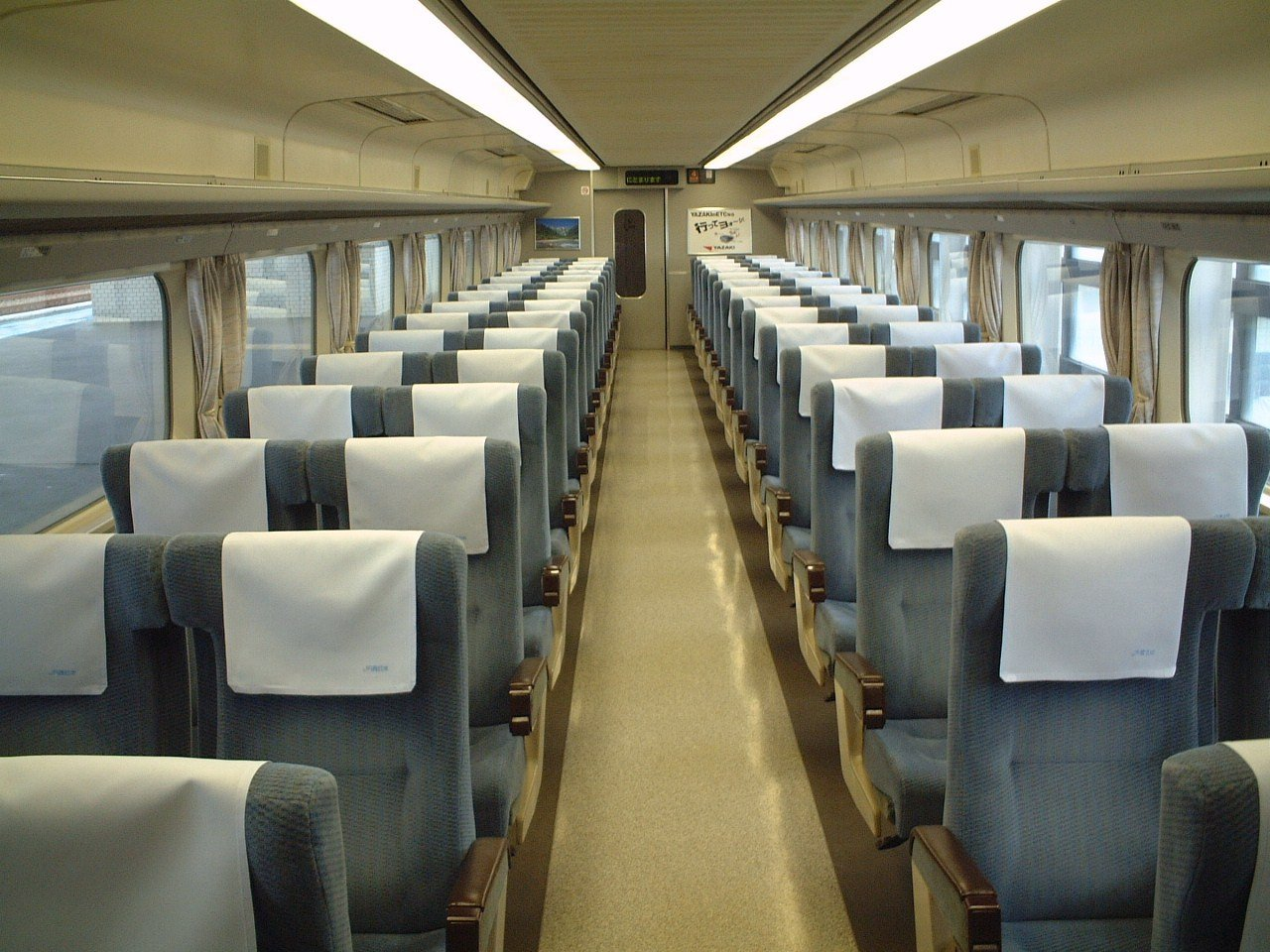
Interior of set P5, showing 2+2 seating, in May 2002

Set P2 was withdrawn on 9 February 2009, and moved to the JR-West training centre at Shimonoseki, where it replaced the former 0 series set Q3 as a static training set. P2's role as a training set ended in March 2013.

The last P sets in revenue service were withdrawn by 11 March 2011.

=== 6-car K sets ===
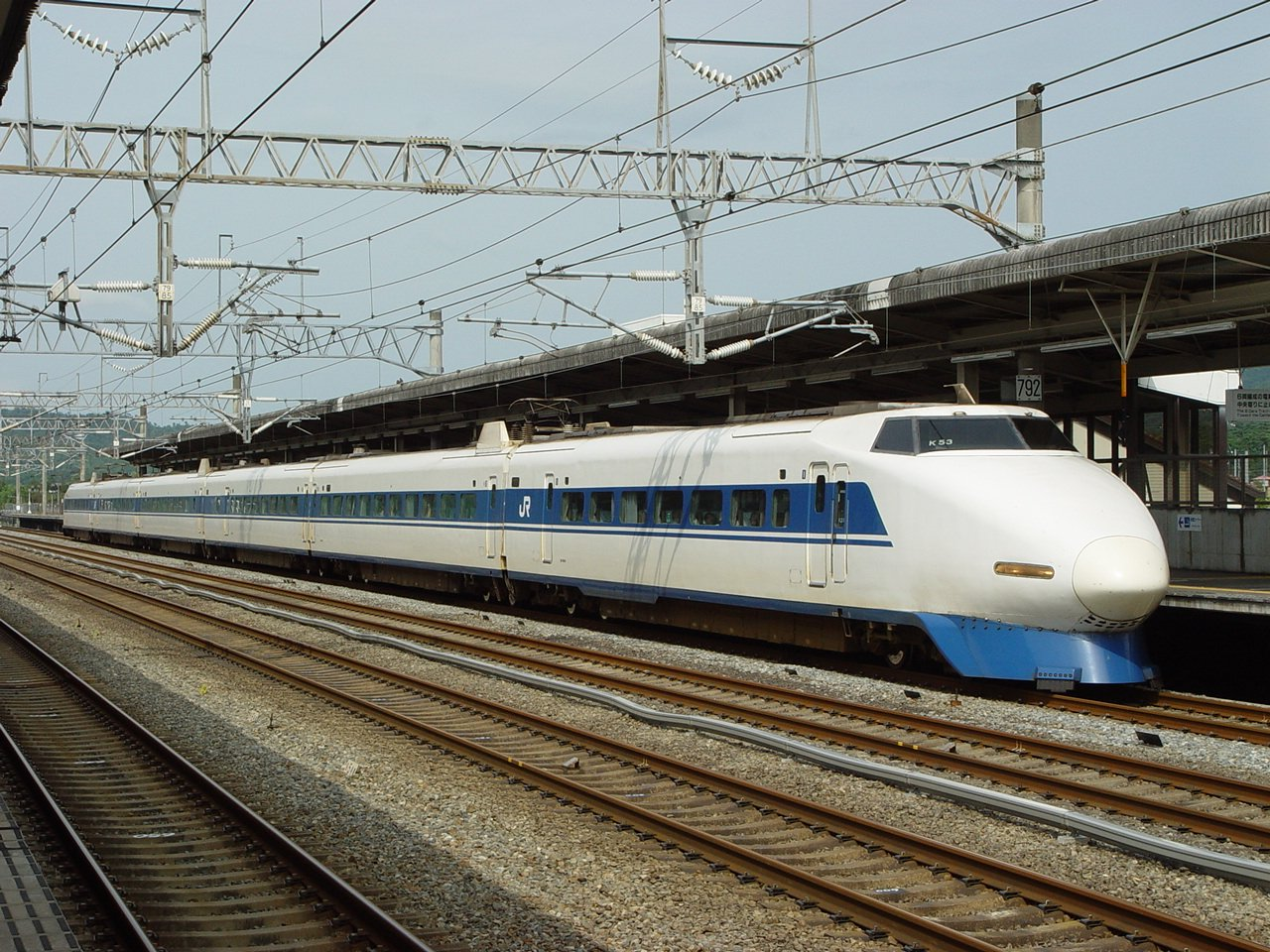
Set K53 in original white/blue livery in July 2003

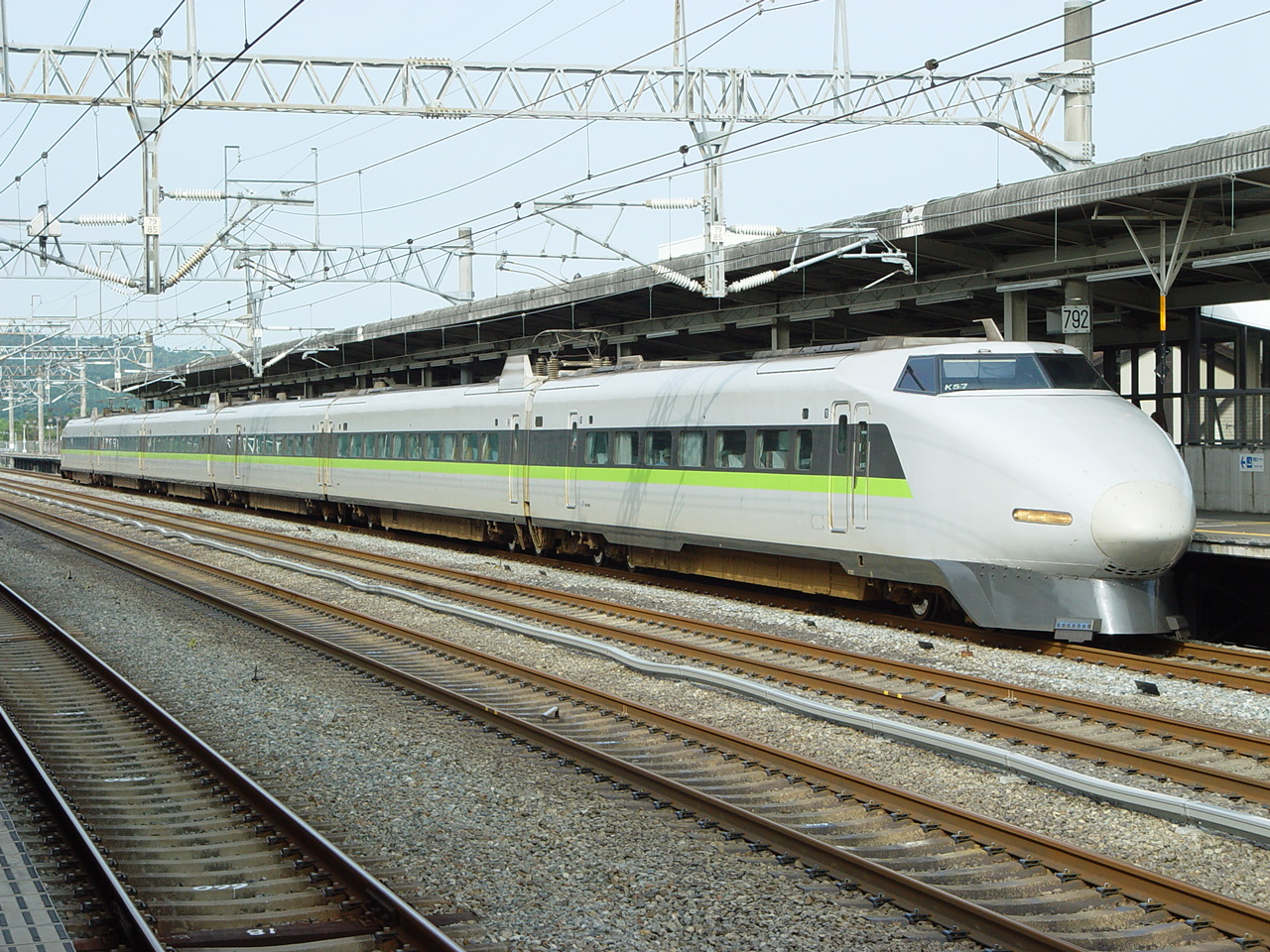
Set K57 in JR-West "Kodama" livery in July 2003

The first six-car K set (K51) was formed in January 2002 for use on Sanyo Shinkansen Kodama services from February 2002. These sets feature 2+2 abreast seating throughout, utilizing former Green class seats from withdrawn 100 series cars. Sets started appearing in the new JR-West Kodama livery from August 2002, with all ten sets (K51–K60) similarly treated by August 2004.

Three K sets were returned to the original white/blue livery from July 2010. The first set treated, K53, was returned to traffic on 14 July 2010.

These sets were withdrawn from service on 16 March 2012.

==== Formation ====
Car No.	1	2	3	4	5	6
Designation	Mc	M'	M7	M'	M7	M'c
Numbering	121-5000	126-3000	125-3700	126-3200	125-3000	122-5000
Seating capacity	52	80	58	72	72	60

Cars 2 and 6 were equipped with cross-arm pantographs.

== Preserved examples ==
- 123-1 (set X2) and 168-9001 (set X1) at the SCMaglev and Railway Park in Aichi Prefecture since March 2011.
- 122-5003 (from set K54, formerly 122-3003 from set V3) preserved at the Kyoto Railway Museum, which opened in April 2016.
- 168-3009 and 179-3009 (both from set V9) at Hakata General Depot in Fukuoka Prefecture
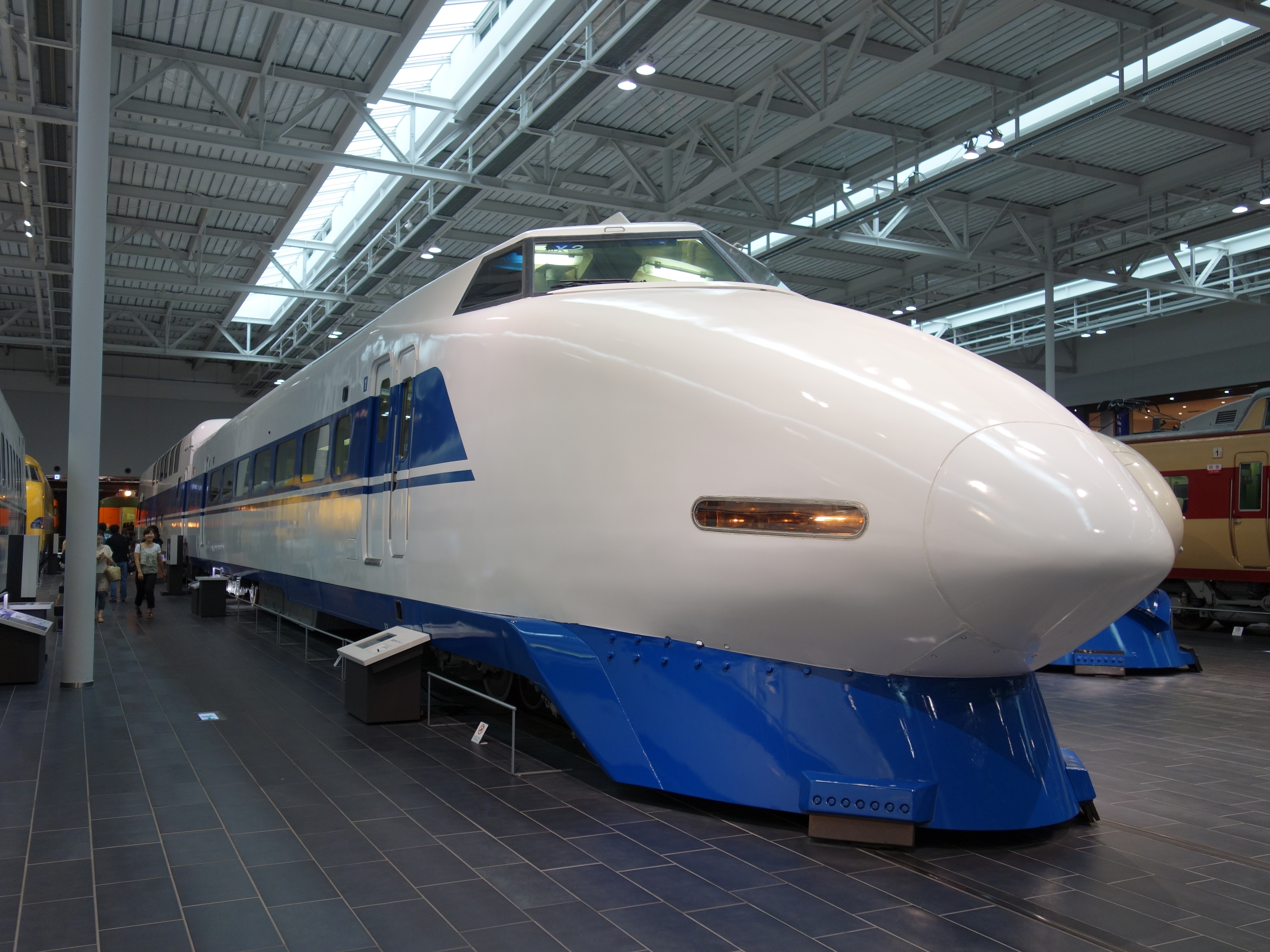
Preserved car 123-1 (from set X2) at the SCMaglev and Railway Park in July 2012

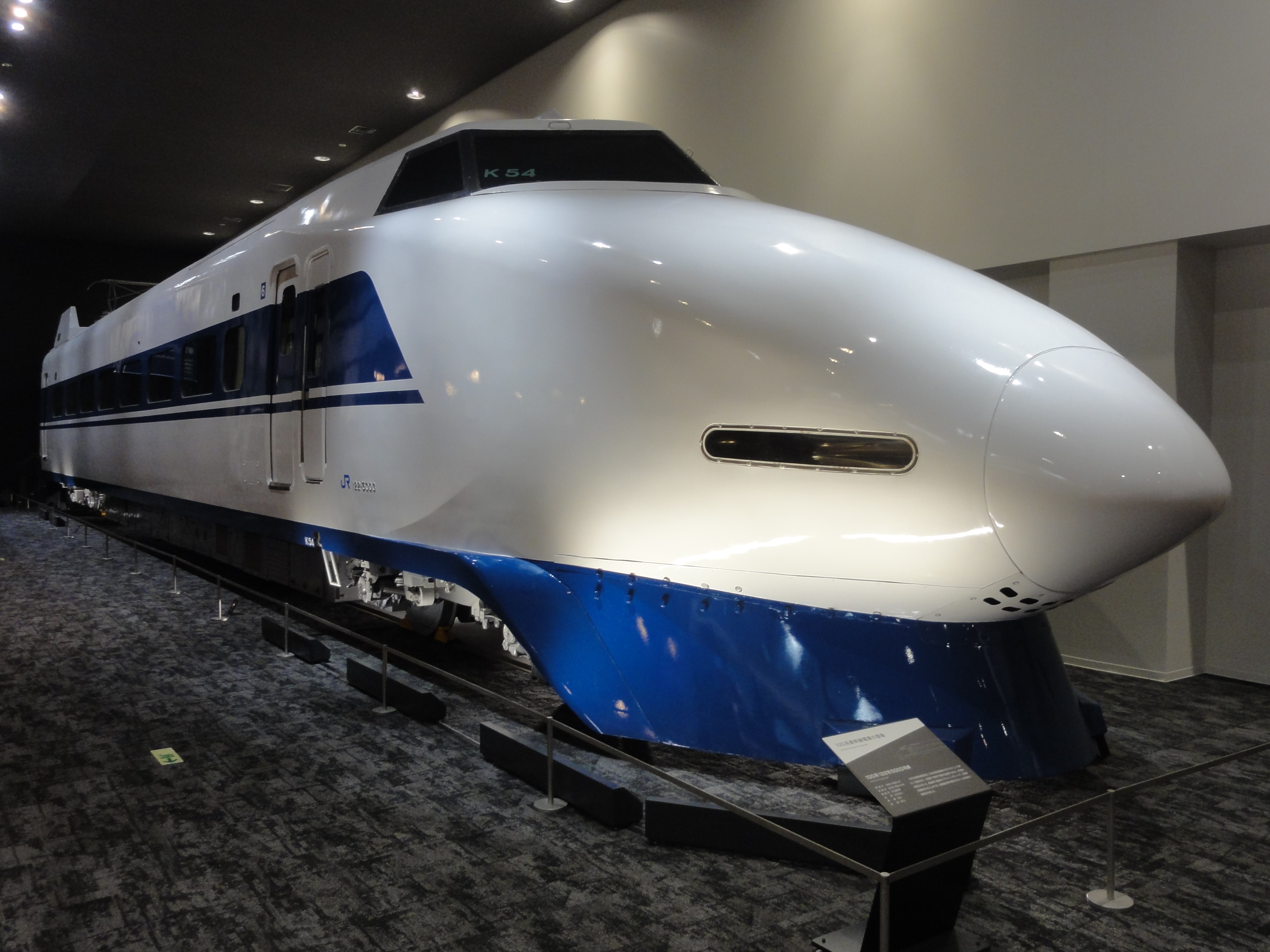
Preserved car 122-5003 (from set K54) at the Kyoto Railway Museum in May 2016

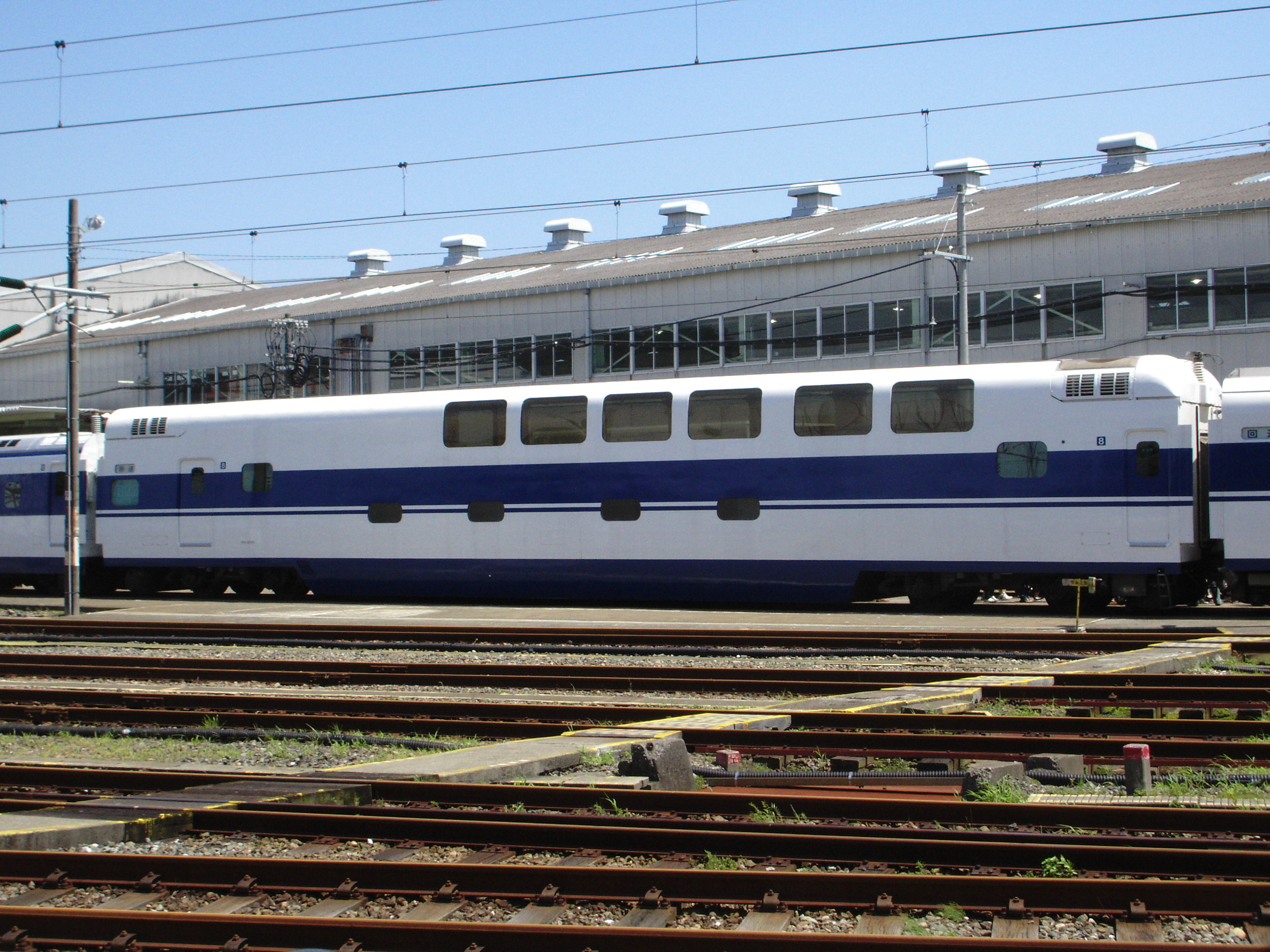
Preserved bilevel restaurant car 168-9001 (from set X1) at Hamamatsu Works in July 2007

== See also ==
- List of high-speed trains
