= 181 series =

Japanese train type

151/161/181 series
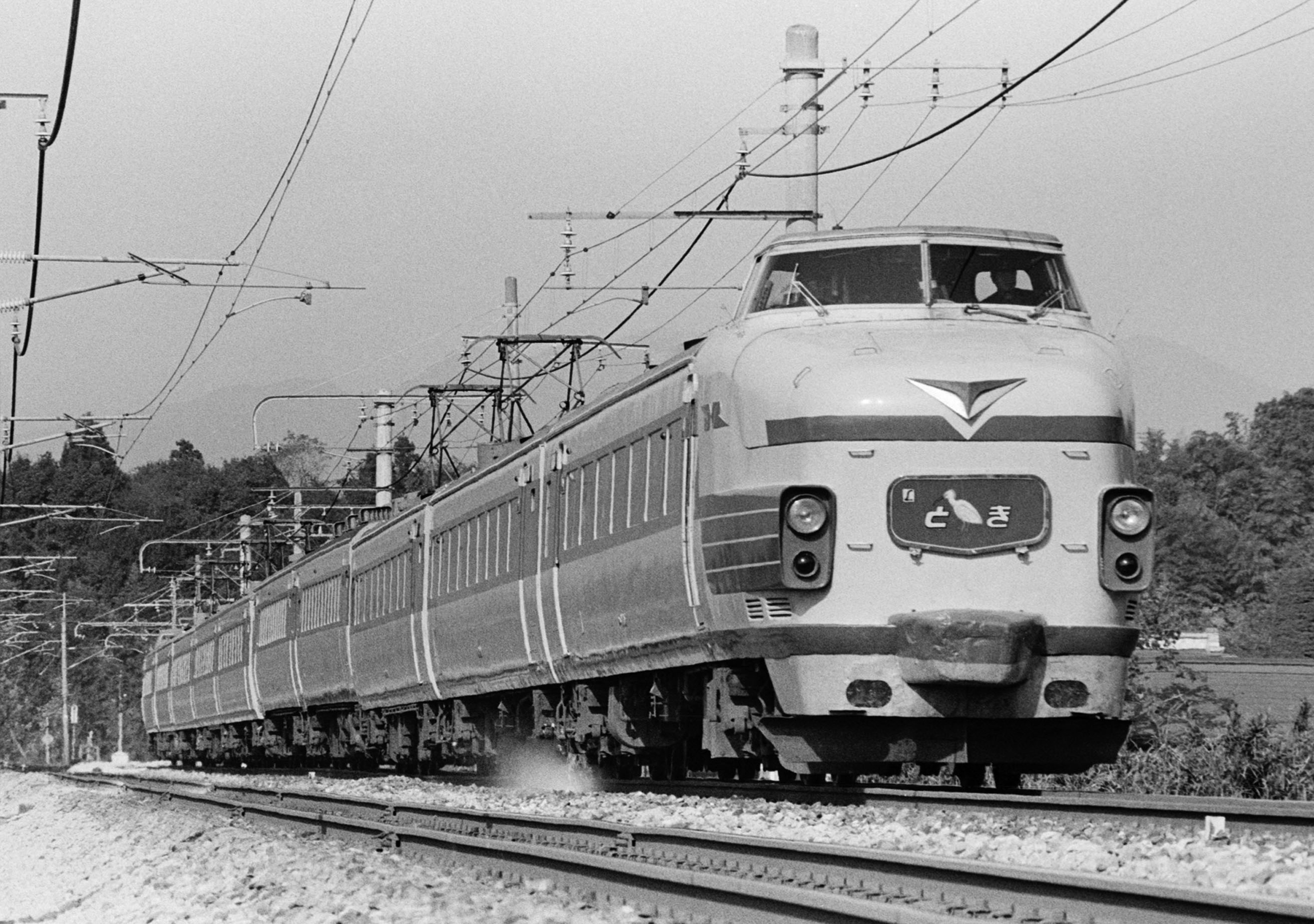
- A JNR 181 series train on a Toki service in 1982
- Stock type: Electric multiple unit
- In service: 1958–1982
- Manufacturers: Kawasaki Heavy Industries, Kinki Sharyo, Toshiba
- Constructed: 1958–1963
- Entered service: 1 November 1958
- Scrapped: 1986
- Operator: JNR

Specifications
- Car body construction: Steel
- Car length: Cab cars: 21,250 mm (69 ft 9 in); Intermediate cars: 20,500 mm (67 ft 3 in)
- Width: 2,946 mm (9 ft 8.0 in)
- Doors: 1 or 2 per side
- Maximum speed: 110 km/h (68 mph); 163 km/h (101 mph) (Record speed for a narrow gauge train in Japan for 151 series)
- Traction system: Resistor control MT46 (151 & 161 series); MT54 (181 series)
- Power output: 100kW (MT46); 120kW (MT54)
- Gear ratio: 22:77
- Electric system: 1,500 V DC
- Current collection: overhead catenary
- Bogies: DT23, TR58
- Track gauge: 1,067 mm (3 ft 6 in)

Notes/references
- This train won the 2nd Blue Ribbon Award in 1959.

The 181 series (181系) (and the earlier 151 and 161 series variants) was a Japanese limited express electric multiple unit (EMU) type operated by Japanese National Railways (JNR).

== Variants ==
- 151 series
- 161 series
- 181 series

The 151 series trains were introduced in 1958 on Kodama limited services on the Tokaido Main Line. 161 series trains were introduced in 1959 on Toki limited services on the Joetsu Line. All 151 and 161 series cars were subsequently modified to become 181 series alongside newly built 181 series cars.

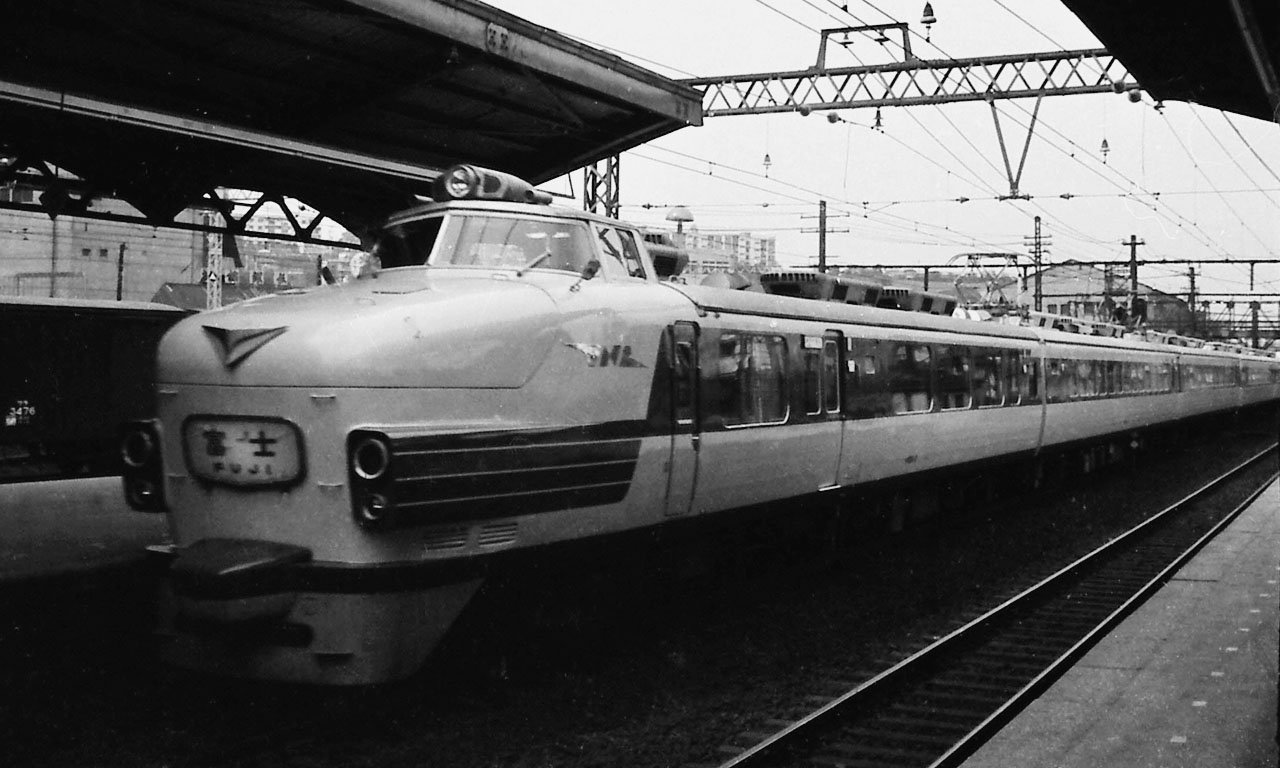
A 151 series on a Fuji limited express service

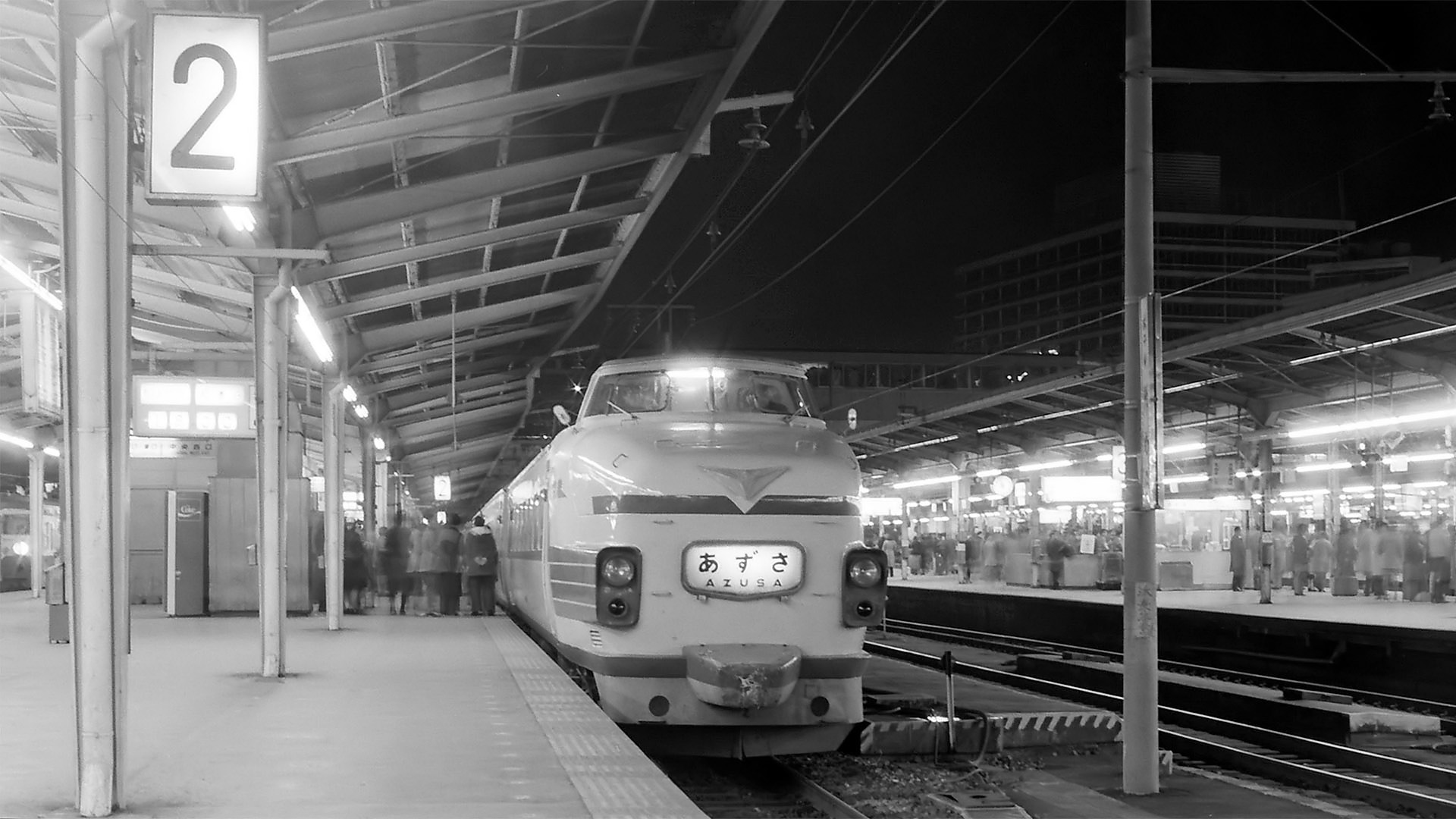
A JNR 181 series train on an Azusa service in January 1975

== Preserved examples ==
- KuHa 181 1: Preserved outside the Kawasaki Heavy Industries factory in Kobe, and restored in November 2016 to its original style and numbering as "KuHa 26001"
- KuHa 181 45: Preserved at the Railway Museum in Saitama Prefecture
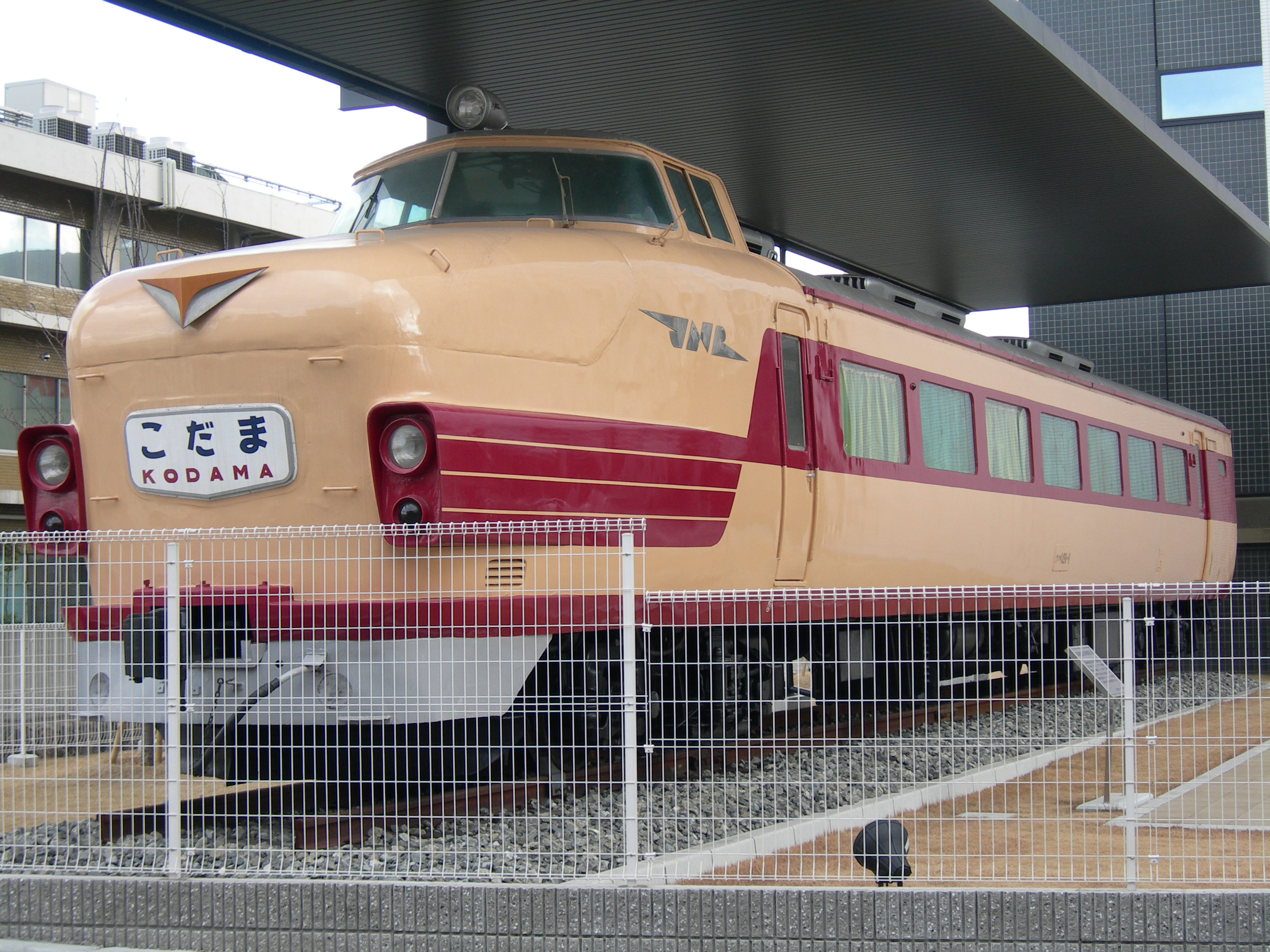
KuHa 181 1 (formerly Kuha 151 1) preserved outside the Kawasaki Heavy Industries factory in Kobe

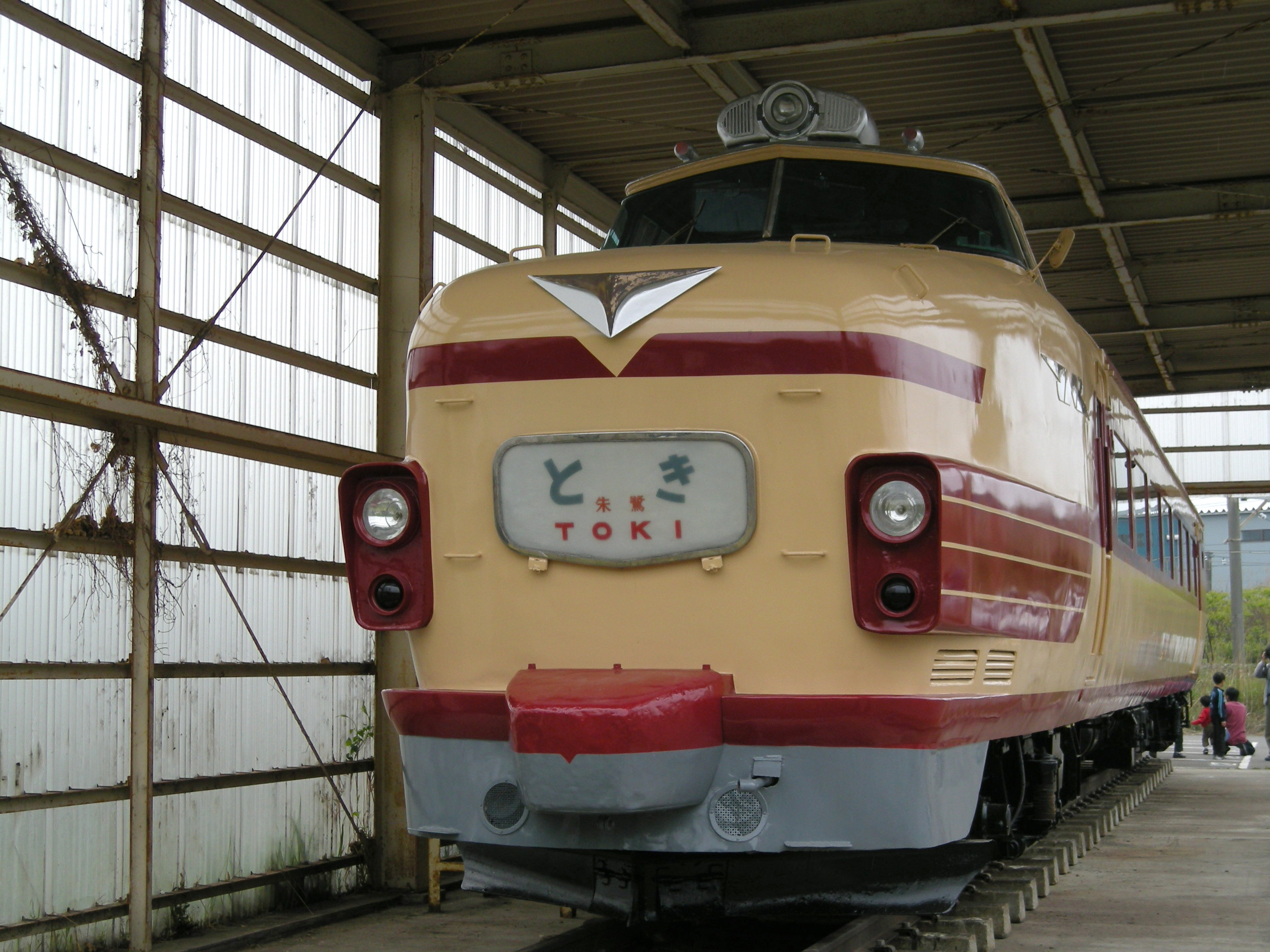
KuHa 181 45 preserved at Niitsu in May 2007 before being moved to the Railway Museum

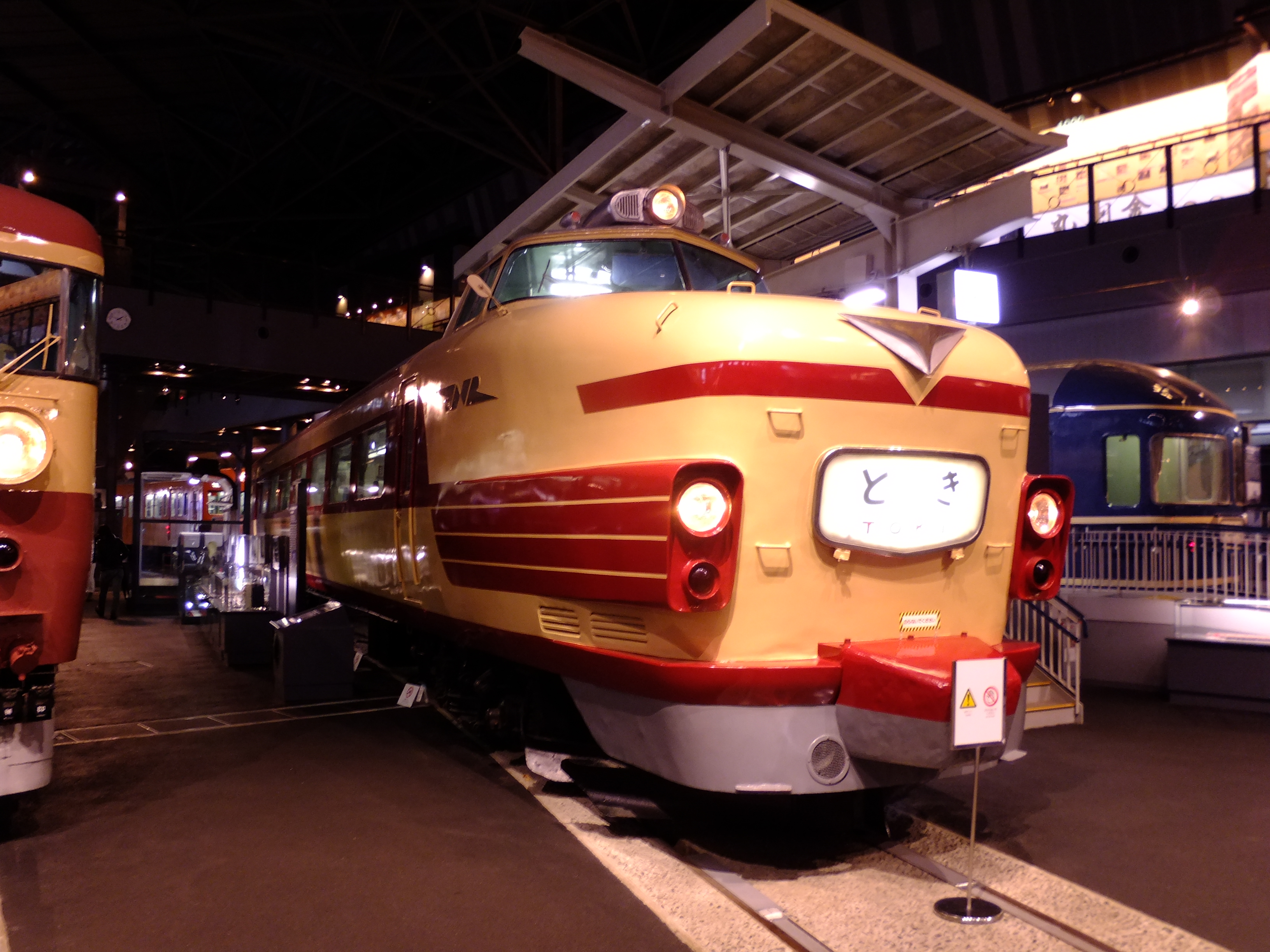
KuHa 181 45 preserved at the Railway Museum in Saitama in 2015
