= 700 Series Shinkansen =

Japanese high speed train type

700 series
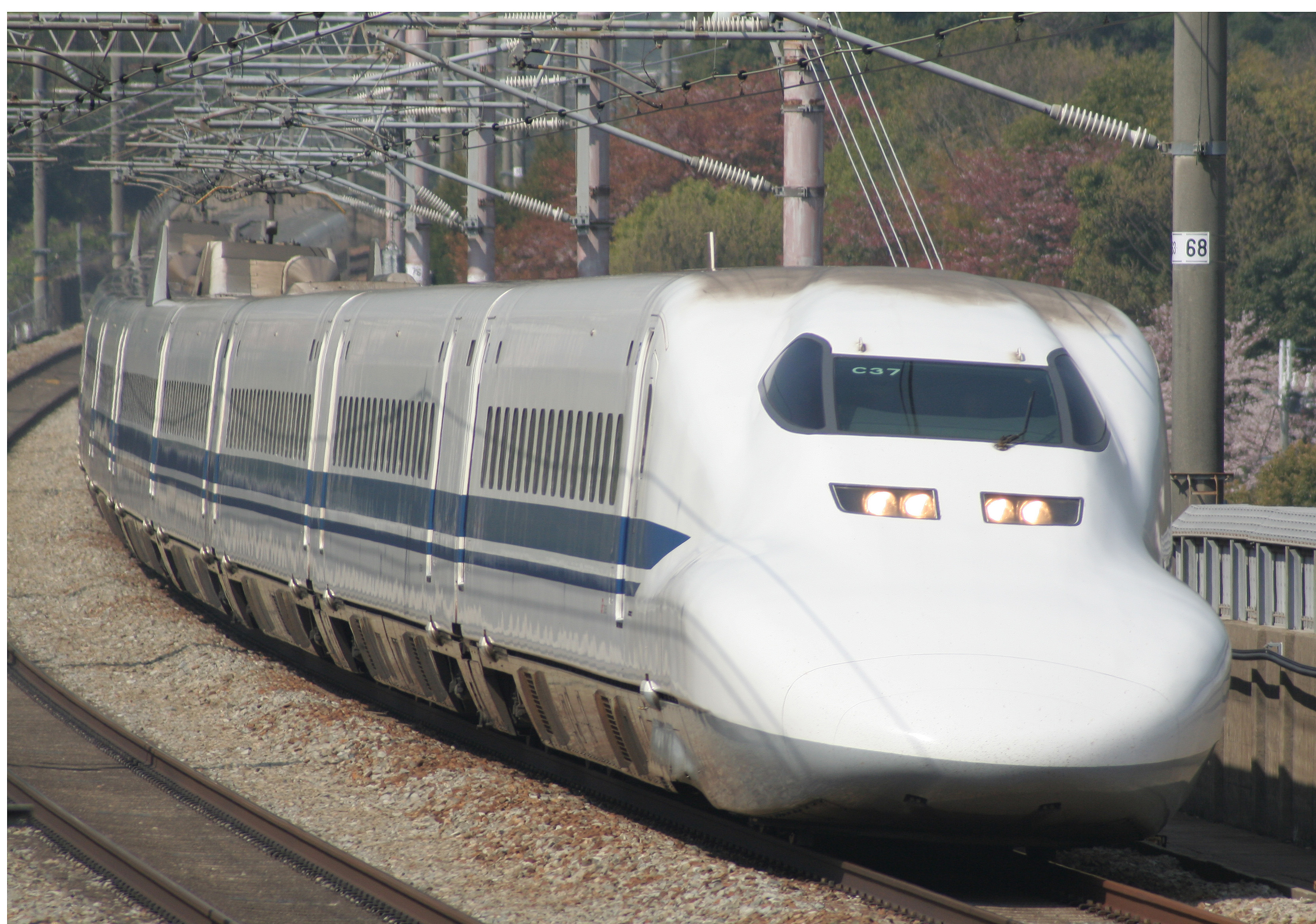
- 16-car 700 series train on the San'yō Shinkansen, April 2009
- Stock type: Electric multiple unit
- In service: 13 March 1999 – present
- Manufacturers: Hitachi, Kawasaki Heavy Industries, Kinki Sharyo, Nippon Sharyo
- Replaced: 0, 100, and 300 series
- Constructed: 1997–2006
- Scrapped: 2011–
- Number built: 1,328 vehicles (91 sets)
- Number in service: 128 vehicles (16 sets)
- Number preserved: 1 vehicle
- Number scrapped: 1,180 vehicles (74 sets)
- Successor: N700 and N700A series
- Formation: 8/16 cars per trainset
- Fleet numbers: C1 – C60; B1 – B15; E1 – E16
- Capacity: 16-car sets: 1,323 (200 Green + 1,123 Standard); 8-car sets: 571
- Operators: JR Central (1999 – 1 March 2020); JR West
- Depots: Osaka, Hakata, Tokyo (1999–2020)
- Lines served: Tokaido Shinkansen (1999–2020); San'yō Shinkansen; Hakataminami Line

Specifications
- Car body construction: Aluminium
- Car length: 25 m (82 ft 0 in) (intermediate cars); 27.35 m (89 ft 9 in) (end cars)
- Width: 3,380 mm (11 ft 1 in)
- Height: 3.69 m (12 ft 1 in) (without rooftop equipment)
- Doors: 2 per side, per car
- Maximum speed: Tokaido: 270 km/h (170 mph); San'yō: 285 km/h (177 mph); Design: 300 km/h (190 mph)
- Traction motors: 48 x 275 kW (369 hp) (16-car set); 24 x 275 kW (369 hp) (8-car set)
- Power output: 13.2 MW (17,701 hp) (16-car set); 6.6 MW (8,851 hp) (8-car set)
- Acceleration: 2 km/(h⋅s) (1.2 mph/s)
- Deceleration: 2.7 km/(h⋅s) (1.7 mph/s)
- Electric system: Overhead line, 25 kV 60 Hz AC
- Current collection: Pantograph
- Safety system: ATC-NS
- Track gauge: 1,435 mm (4 ft 8 1/2 in) standard gauge

The 700 series (Japanese: 700系, Hepburn: Nana-hyaku-kei) is a Japanese Shinkansen high-speed train type built between 1997 and 2006, and entering service in 1999. Originally designated as "N300" during the development phase, they formed the next generation of Shinkansen vehicles jointly designed by JR Central and JR West for use on the Tokaido Shinkansen, Hakata Minami Line and the San'yō Shinkansen. Though it has since been withdrawn from service on the Tokaido Shinkansen, it continues to operate on the San'yō Shinkansen and Hakataminami Line.

== Design ==
The 700 series is characterized by its flat 'duck-bill' nose designed to reduce the piston effect as the trains enter tunnels. 16-car units are painted white with blue stripes beneath the windows, and are used for Nozomi, Hikari, and Kodama services on the Tokaido and San'yō Shinkansen lines, while 8-car units used for the San'yō Shinkansen Hikari Rail Star services have a darker livery (grey with black window areas and a yellow stripe beneath the windows) which also acts to visually deemphasize the units' nose area, resulting in a more streamlined impression.

As with the 500 series trains, yaw dampers are fitted between vehicles, and all cars feature semi-active suspension to ensure smooth ride characteristics at high speed. Compared with the small fleet of high-performance, high-cost 500 series trains built for JR-West, these trains were designed to give improved ride comfort and interior ambience over the earlier 300 series trains at a lower cost than the 500 series trains. The cost of a 16-car 700 series unit is approximately 4 billion yen compared with around 5 billion yen for a 16-car 500 series train.

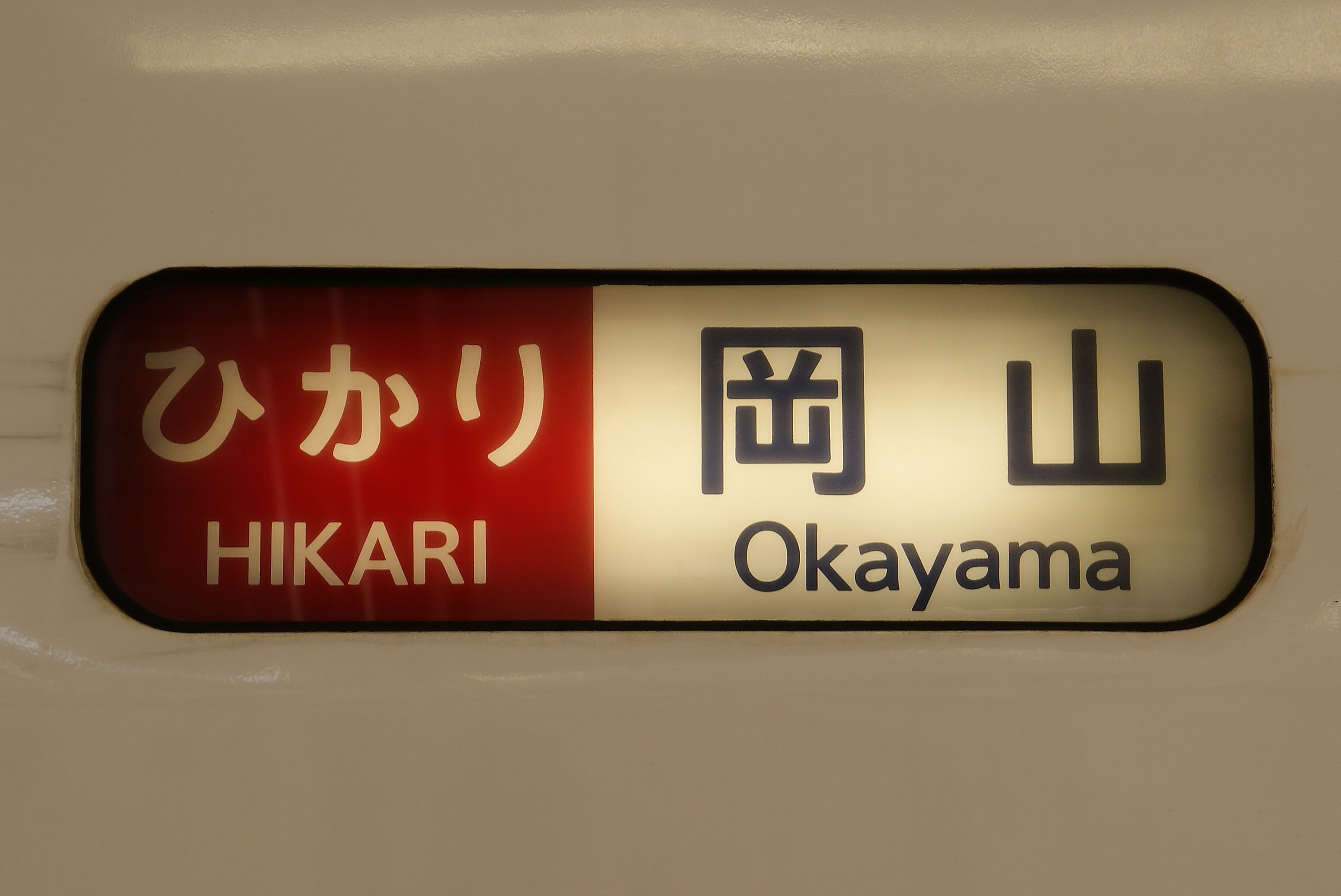
C sets
Destination display

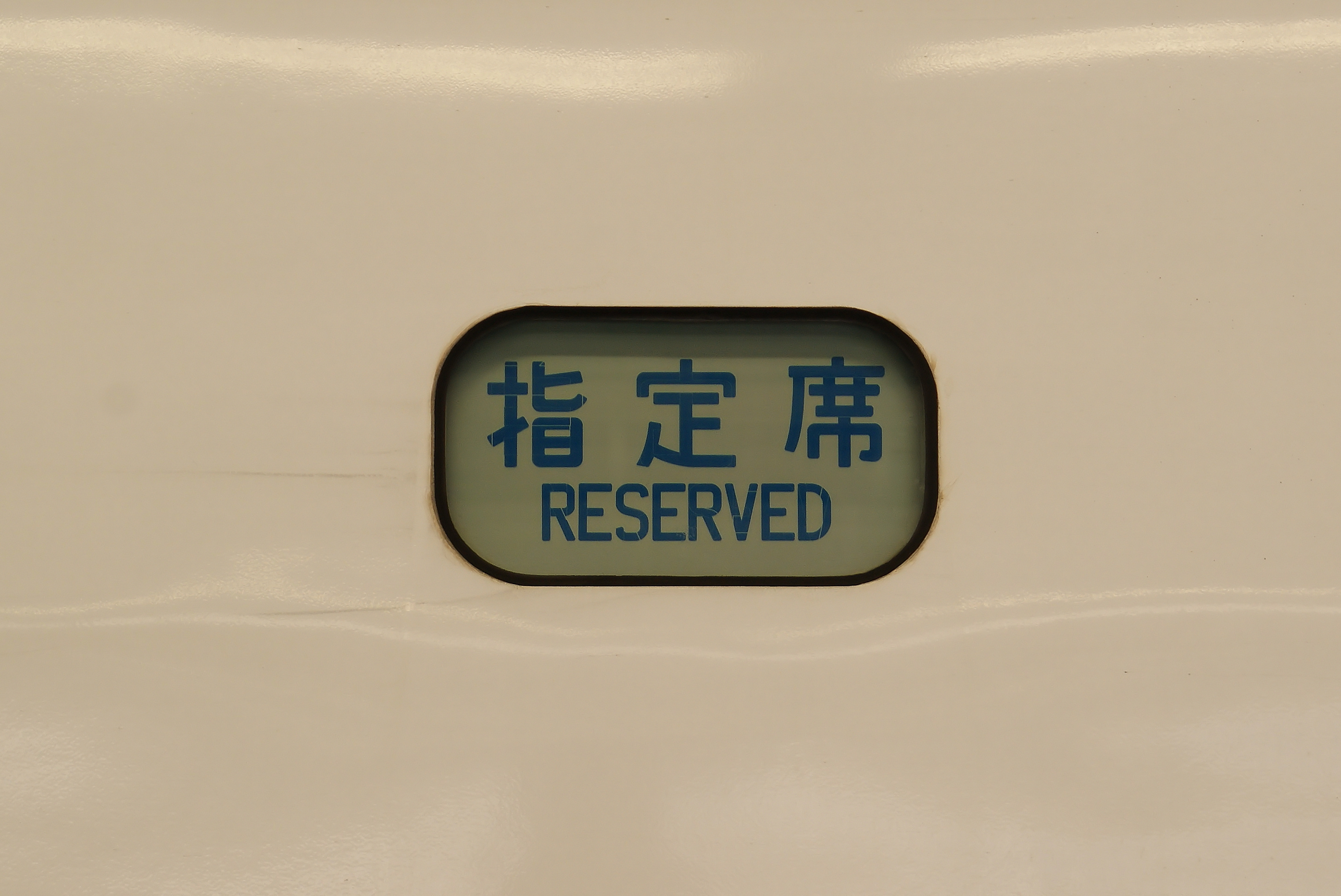
C sets
Reservation display

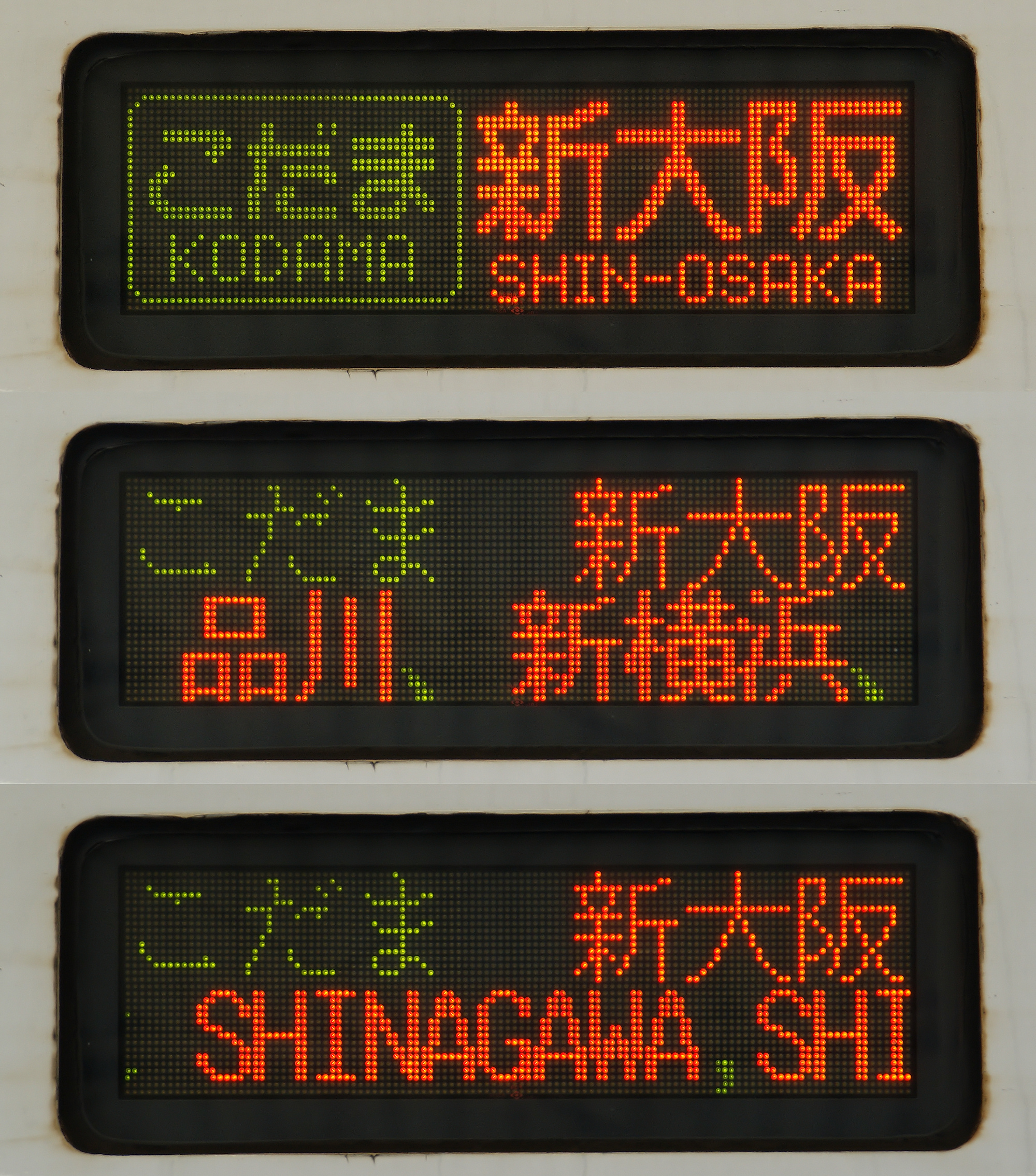
B sets
Destination display

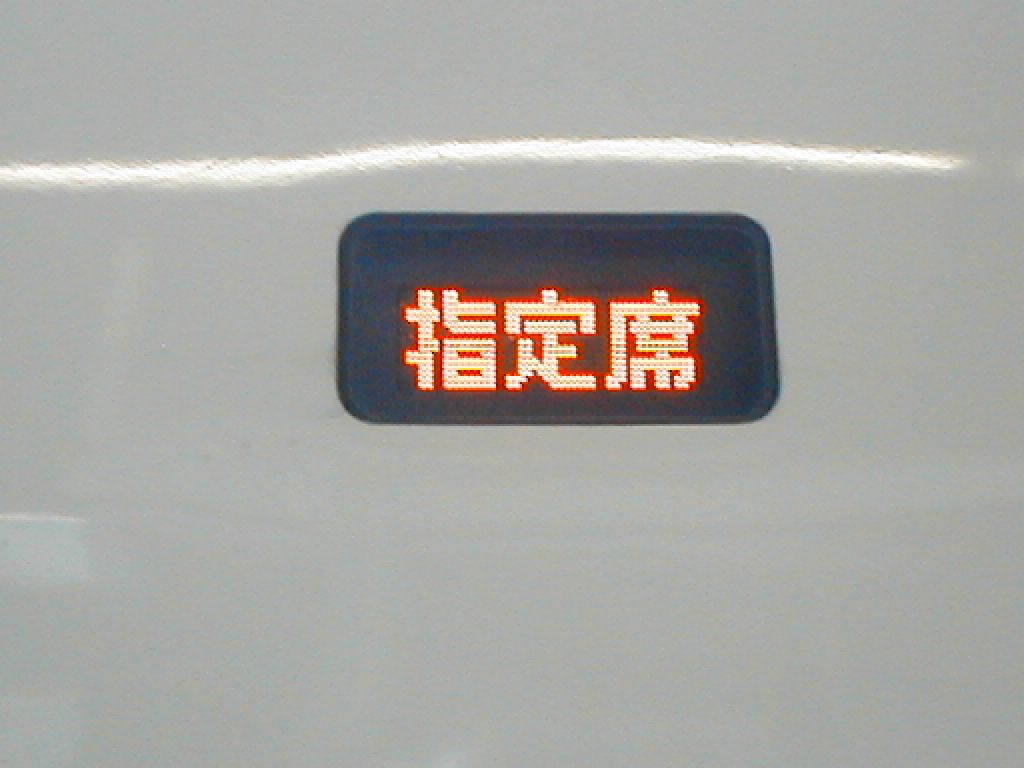
B sets
Reservation display

== Operations ==
700 series trainsets were scheduled to be withdrawn from Tokaido Shinkansen services by the end of fiscal 2019. The last 700 series Tokaido Shinkansen run took place on 1 March 2020. However, the 700 series still operates on the San'yō Shinkansen.

== Variants ==
- 700-9000 series: 16-car pre-series set
- 700-0 series: 16-car "C" sets owned by JR Central, introduced from March 1999. Retired from service on 28 February 2020. (Originally scheduled to be 8 March 2020)
- 700-3000 series: 16-car "B" sets owned by JR-West, introduced from 2001. Retired from service in August 2020.
- 700-7000 series: 8-car Hikari Rail Star "E" sets owned by JR-West, introduced from 11 March 2000

== Pre-series unit (700-9000 series) ==
The pre-series set, C0, was delivered in October 1997, and underwent endurance running mainly between Tokyo and Shin-Osaka until early 1999, including a short period of testing as an 8-car formation on the Sanyo Shinkansen. New single-arm current collectors were fitted from the start, and these initially featured the distinctive "wine-glass" pantograph shrouds of the 300X train. These were later changed to a design resembling the 500 series arrangement with additional side fences, which was used on the subsequent production trains. Unit C0 was modified to full production standard in September 1999 and renumbered as C1, and was officially withdrawn in January 2013.

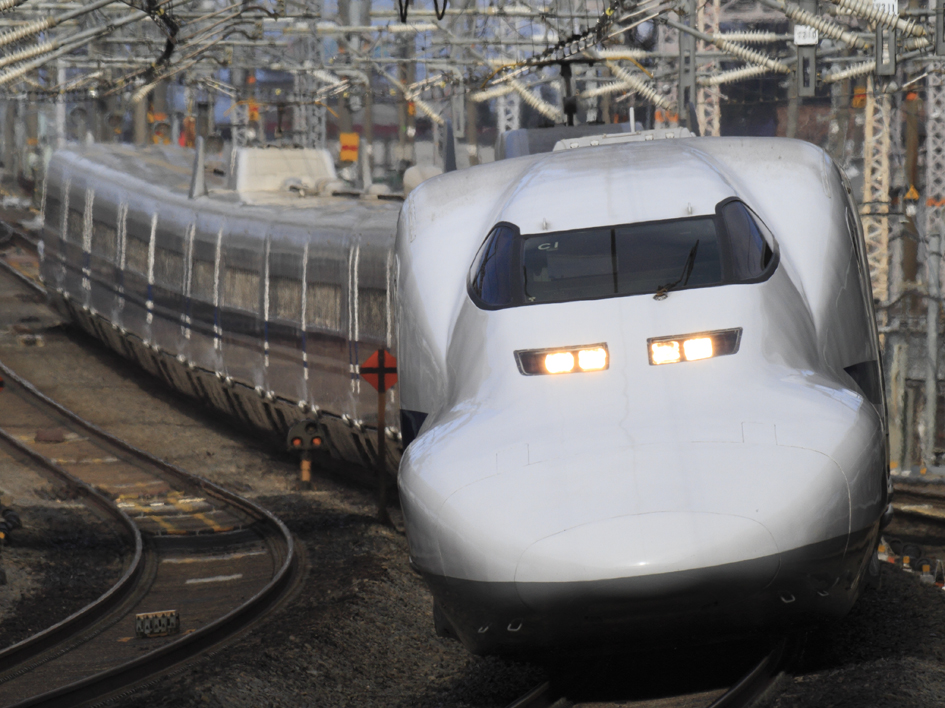
Set C1 in service in January 2010

== 16-car C sets ==
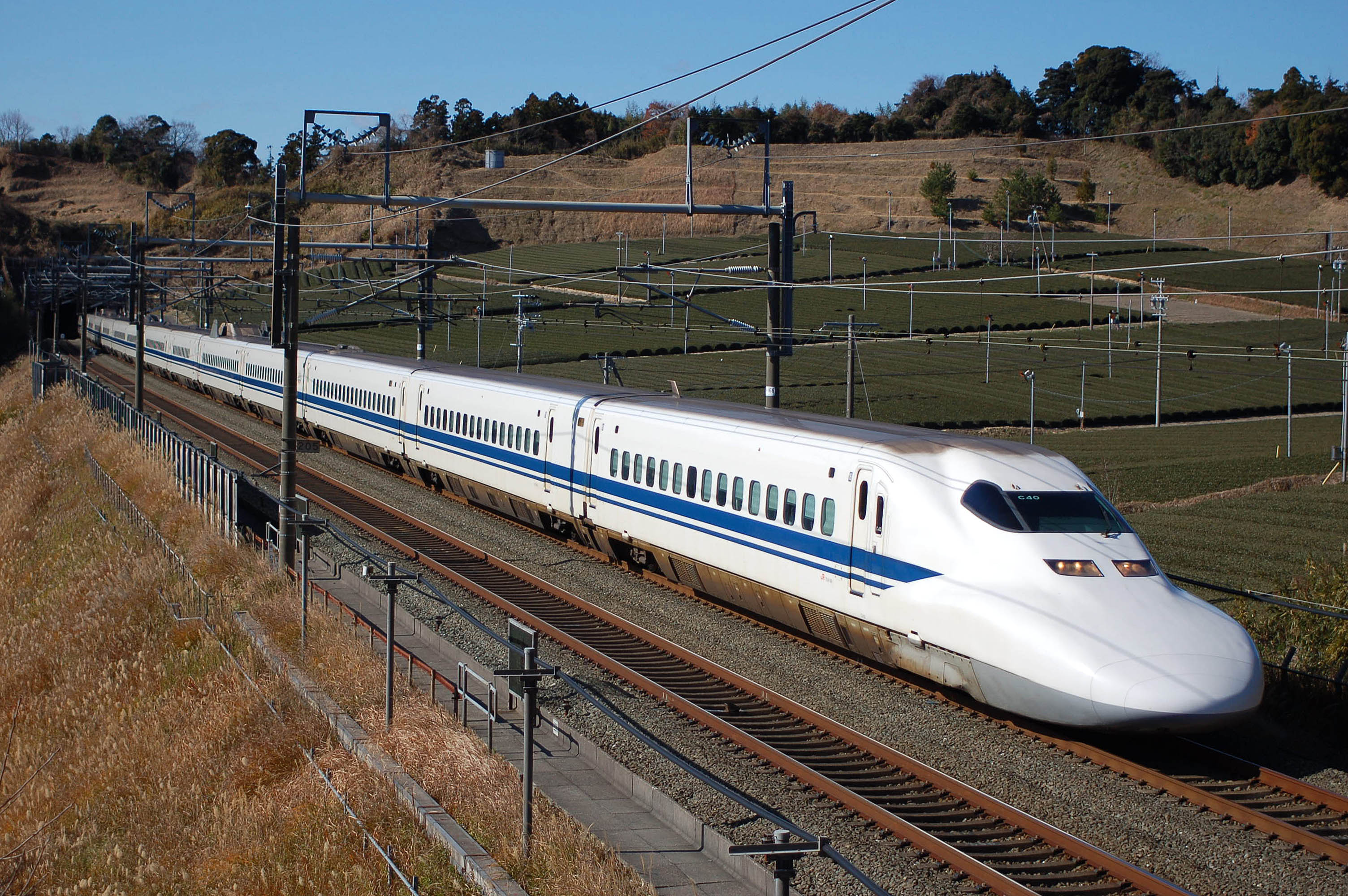
JR Central set C40 on the Tokaido Shinkansen between Kakegawa and Shizuoka in January 2008

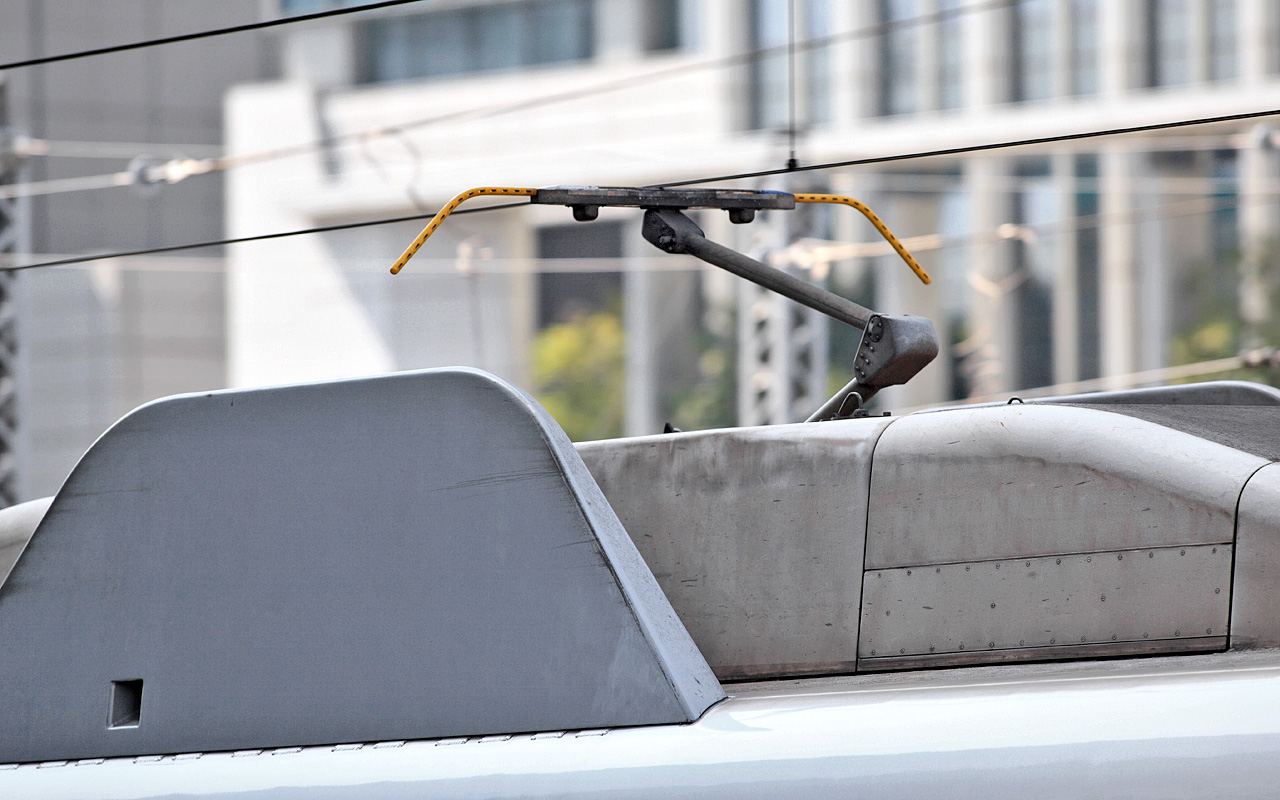
Pantograph detail in March 2009

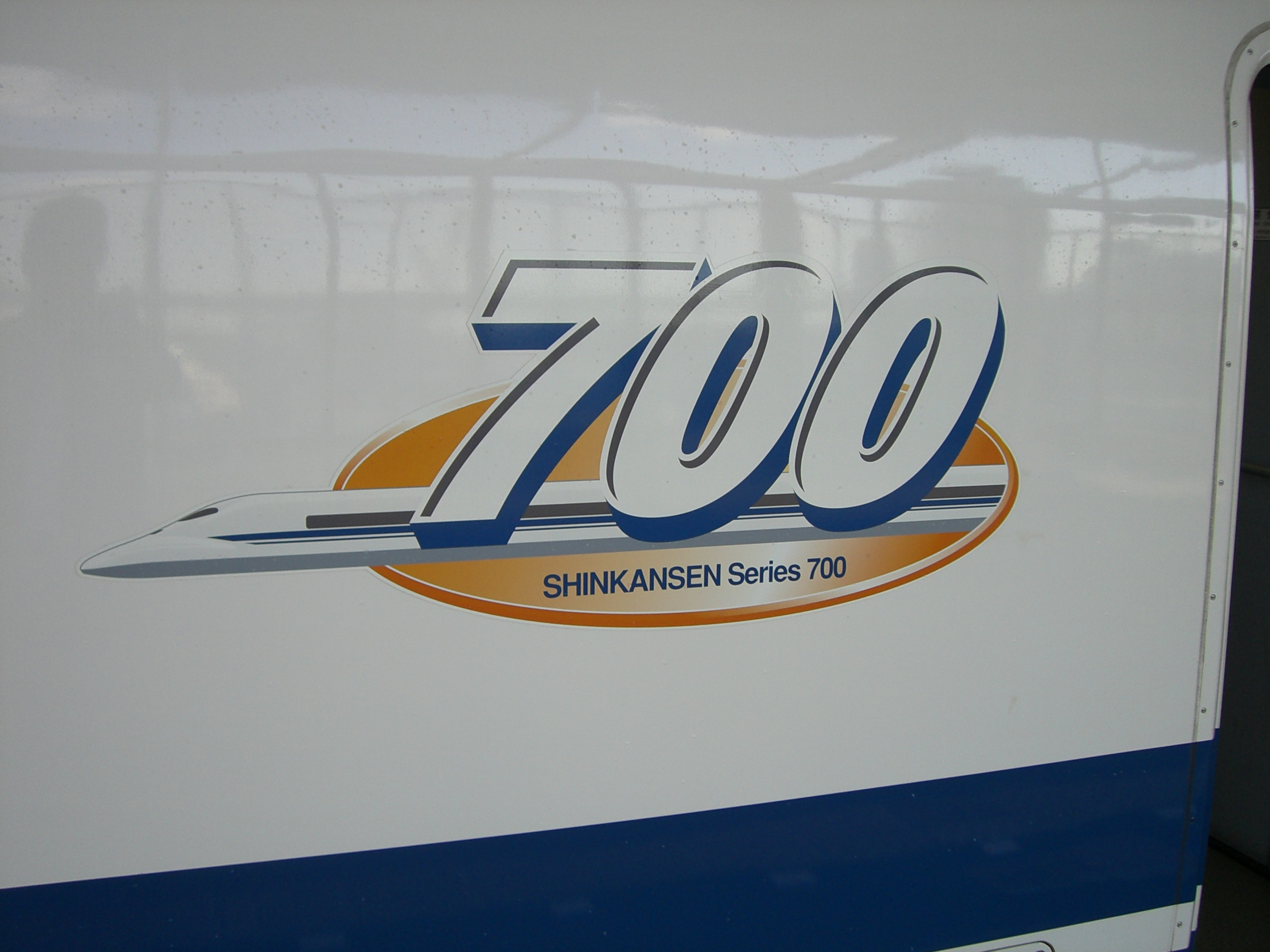
700 series logo next to door

These units were ordered by JR Central for use on Tokyo to Hakata Nozomi services, allowing the 300 series trains to displace the 100 series trains on Hikari services which intern replaced the 0 series trains on Kodama services. Interior layout and accommodation is similar to that of the 300 series trains, with three Green class (first class) vehicles, and the same 104 cm (41 in) seat pitch in standard class, and 116 cm (46 in) in Green class. The central gangways were widened by 3 cm (1.2 in) to 60 cm (24 in), and ceilings were raised by 65 mm (2.6 in) to 2.2 m (7 ft 3 in). The refreshment counters of the 300 and 500 series trains were discontinued and replaced by vending machines selling drinks, located in cars 3, 7, 11, and 15.

Specifications permit 285 km/h (177 mph) running on the Sanyo Shinkansen with speed restricted to 270 km/h (168 mph) on the Tokaido Shinkansen between Tokyo and Shin-Osaka. The initial batch ordered by JR Central consisted of 17 units, with the first 4 units delivered in time for introduction on three daily return Nozomi services from March 1999. Services featuring 700 series stock were increased to five daily from July 1999, and further increased from October 1999. With continuing deliveries, 700 series trains were also introduced on Tōkaidō Shinkansen Hikari services from late 2000 and Kodama services from October 2003.

Set numbers C25 onwards introduced from May 2001 incorporate minor interior design improvements, including power outlets at the ends of cars for PC users, and hand-grabs on the edge of aisle seats. An order for an additional batch of six units was placed by JR Central in December 2003, with delivery scheduled for the end of 2004. These sets (C55 to C60) provided additional capacity for services connected with the Aichi Expo in 2005.

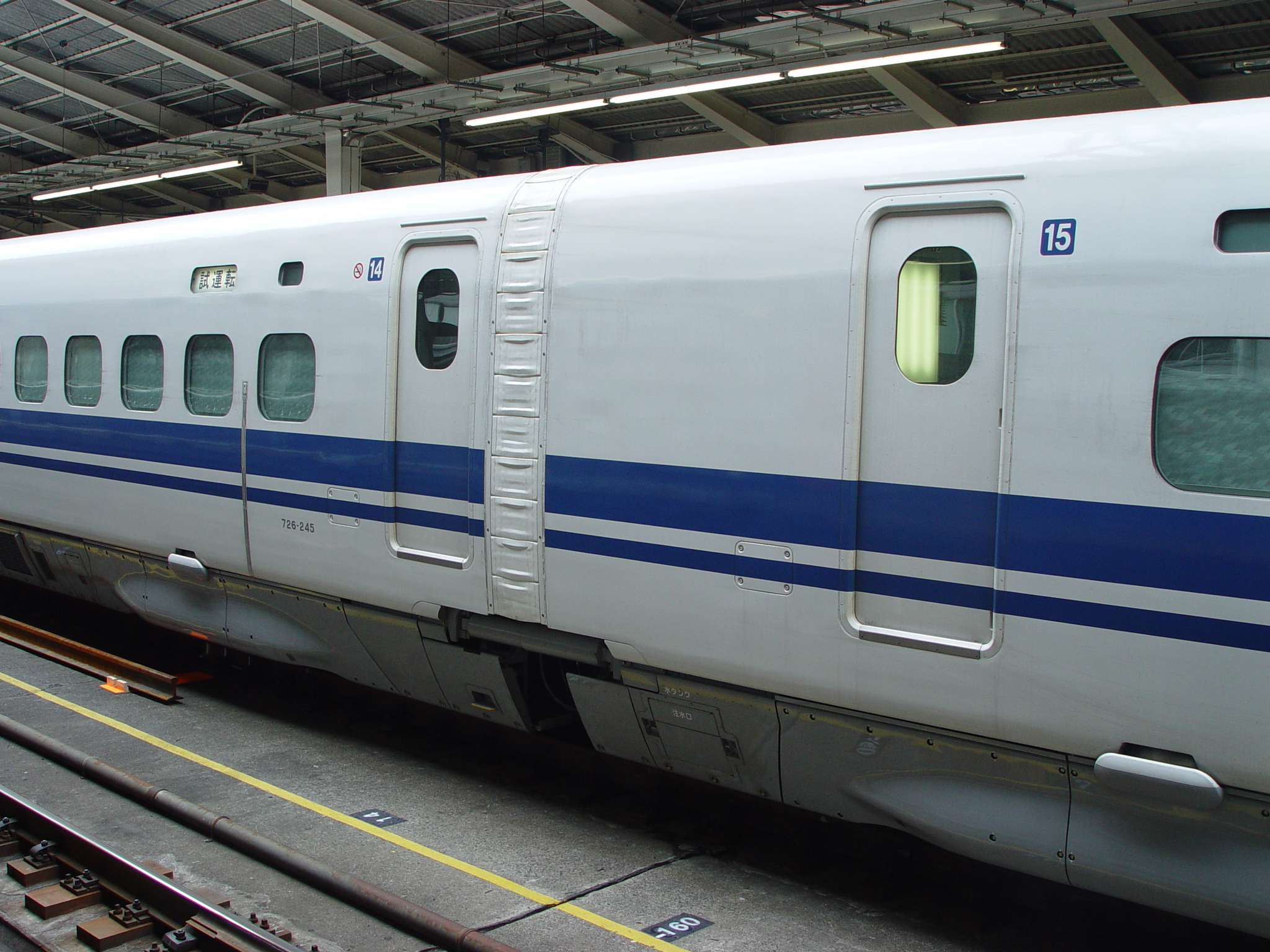
Streamlined bogie covers and flush diaphragm covers added experimentally to set C46, February 2003

Before entering passenger service, JR Central set C46 was used on a series of test runs from late January 2003 fitted with streamlined bogie covers on all cars and flush diaphragm covers between cars 16/15 and 15/14. These modifications were removed before the unit entered revenue service. Flush diaphragm covers were used on future trains, such as the N700 series.

Between October 2008 and June 2009, JR Central's fleet of 60 700 series sets underwent modifications to increase the acceleration from the original 1.6 to 2 km/(h⋅s) (0.99 to 1.24 mph/s) on the Tokaido Shinkansen to improve timetable planning flexibility.

During fiscal 2011, eight JR Central "C" sets (C11 to C18) were transferred to JR-West to replace its fleet of nine 300 series sets scheduled to be withdrawn by spring 2012.

Withdrawals of 700 series sets began in July 2011 with the withdrawal of set C4. It continued in 2013 (sets C1, C2, C3, C5 – C8) and in 2014 (C9, C10, C20 – C24).

The remaining 700 series sets were removed from regularly scheduled Tokaido Shinkansen services from 1 December 2019. The last Tokaido Shinkansen 700 series run from Tokyo to Shin-Osaka had been scheduled to take place on 8 March 2020, but was cancelled due to the outbreak of COVID-19 in Japan. This cancellation resulted in the last 700 series Tokaido Shinkansen run taking place a week earlier on 1 March 2020.

=== Formation ===
The 16-car C sets are formed as follows, with car 1 at the Hakata (west) end.

Car No.	1	2	3	4	5	6	7	8	9	10	11	12	13	14	15	16
Designation	Tc	M2	M'w	M1	M1w	M'	M2k	T's	Ts	M2s	M'h	M1	M1w	M'	M2w	T'c
Numbering	723	727	726-500	725	725-300	726	727-400	718	719	717	726-700	725-600	725-500	726-200	727-500	724
Seating capacity	65	100	85	100	90	100	75	68	64	68	63	100	90	100	80	75

Cars 5 and 12 each have one single-arm pantograph.

=== Interior ===
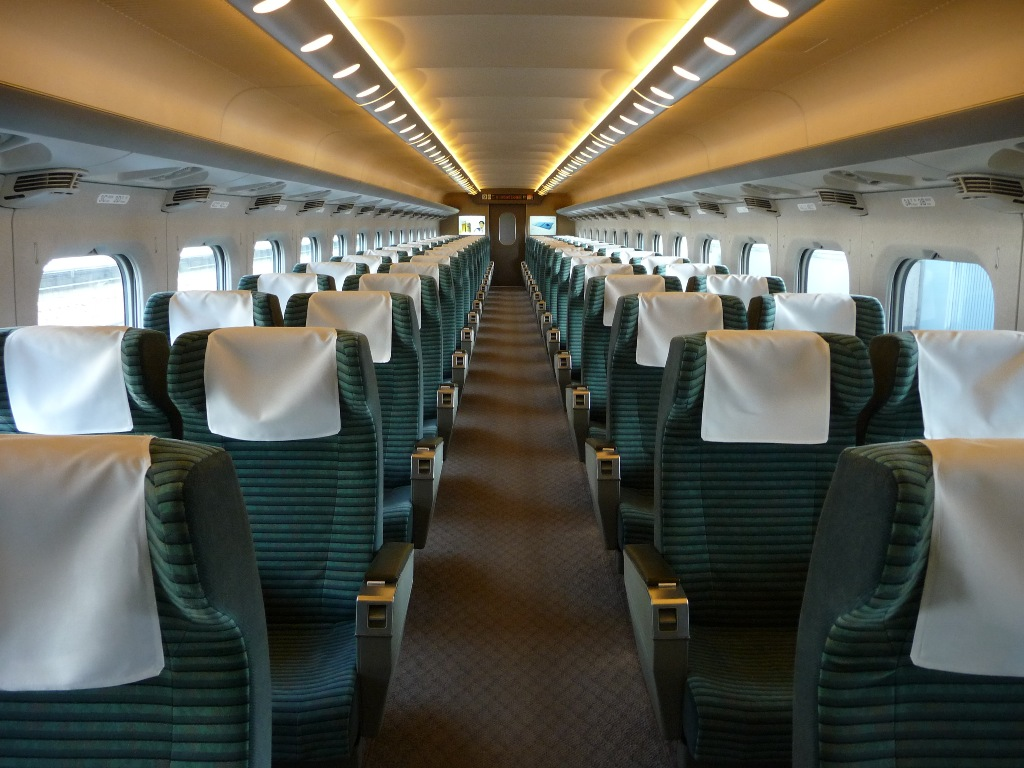
Green-class car (car 9) in March 2010

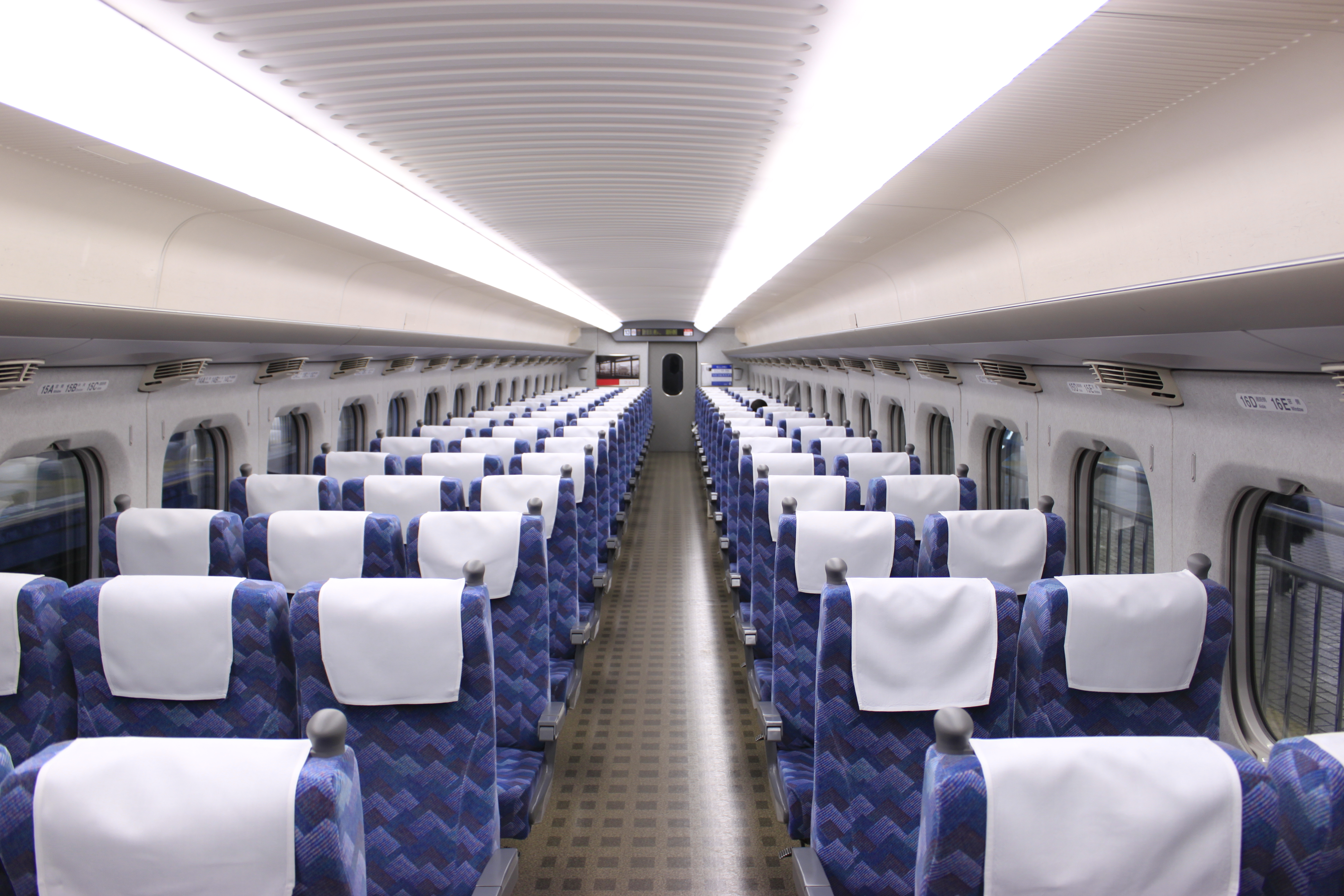
Standard-class car (car 13) in January 2010

== 16-car B sets (700-3000 series) ==
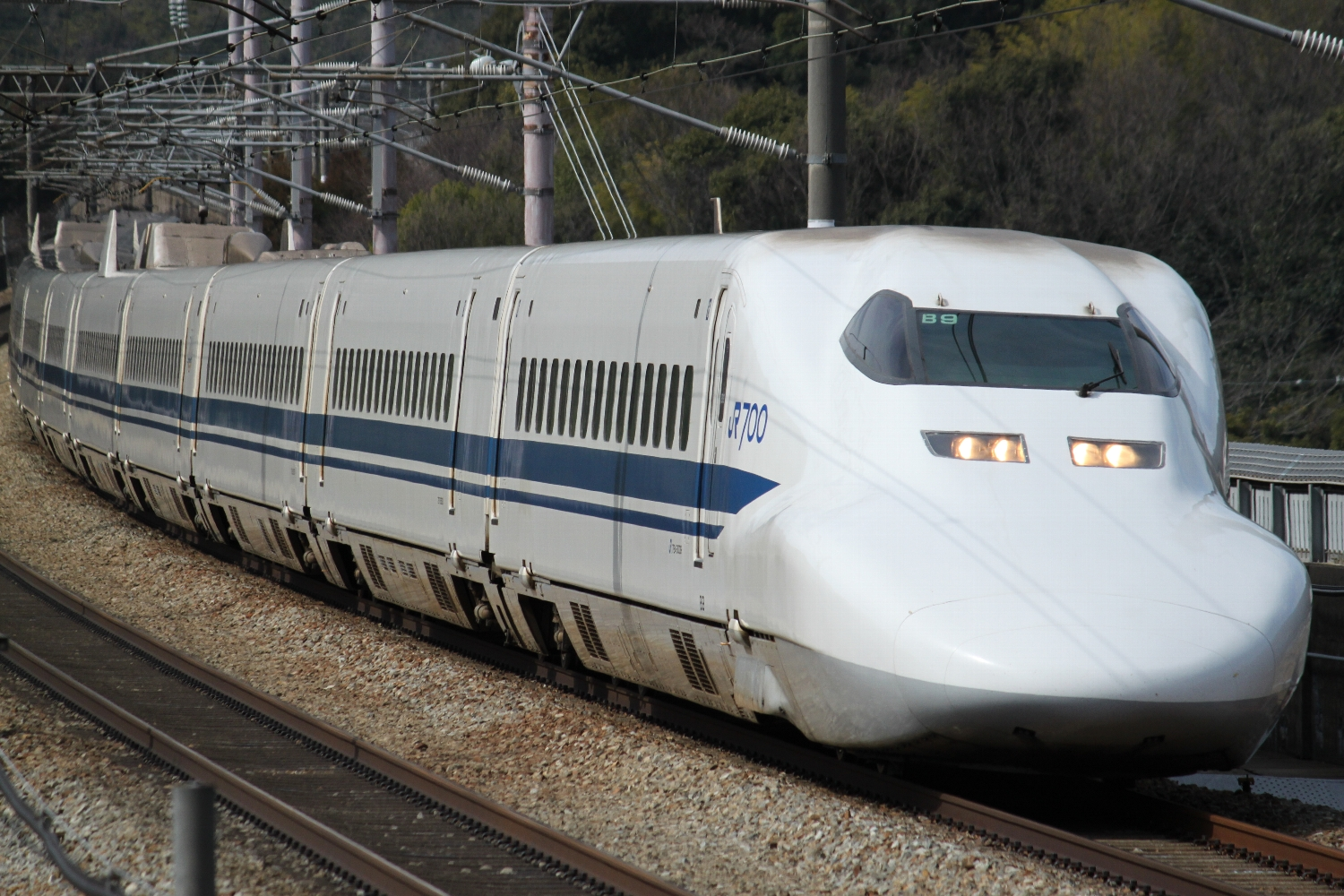
JR-West 700-3000 series set B9 in March 2010

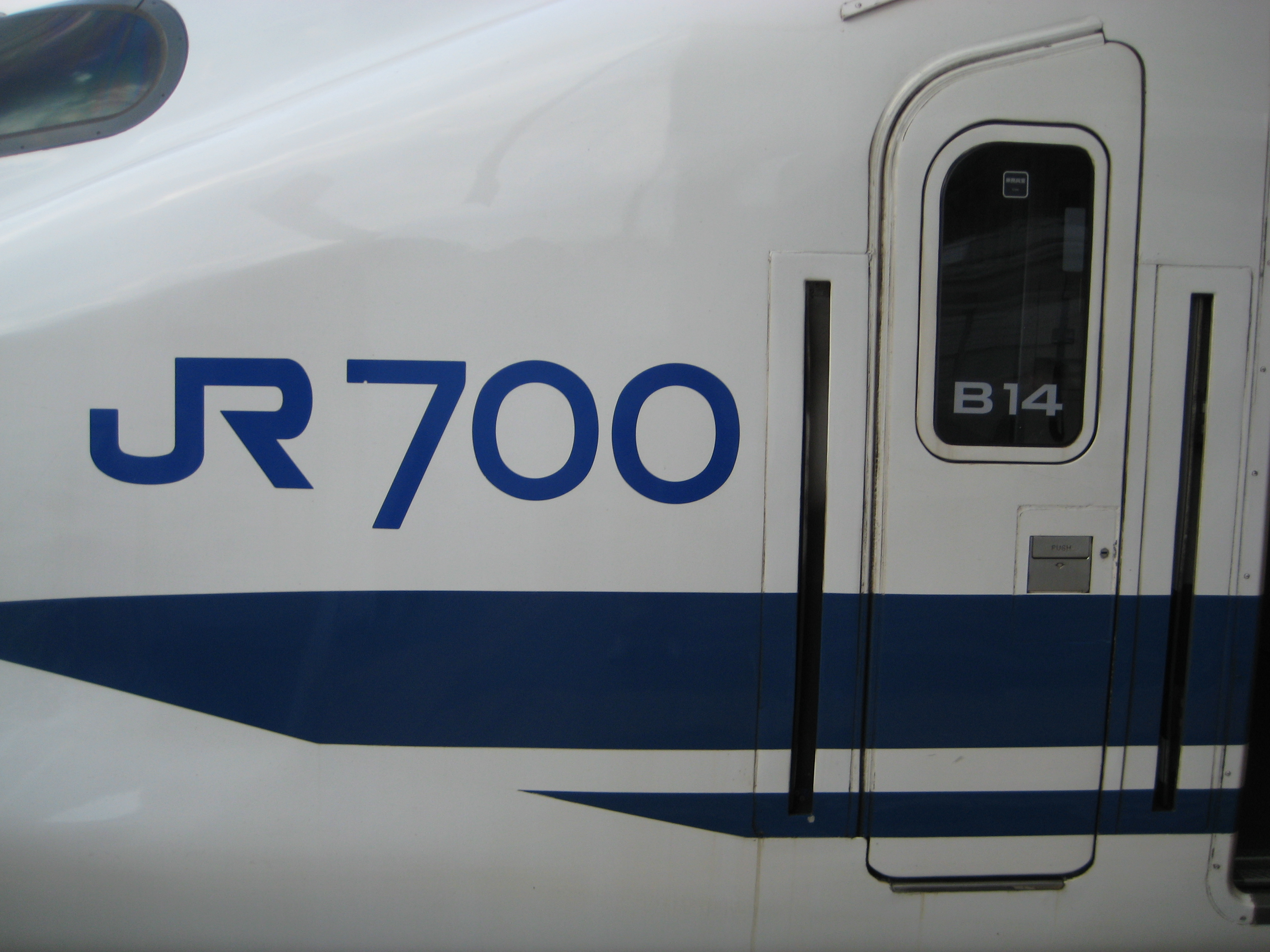
The "JR700" logo on the side of set B14 in January 2011

These are the units owned by JR-West for use on through Hikari services from Tokyo, displacing the 100 series V Grand Hikari stock previously used on these services. With the timetable revision following the opening of Shinagawa Station in October 2003, the number of Nozomi trains increased significantly, and they were also used for the Nozomi service. A total of 15 units were delivered from June 2001 to January 2006. These trains use the same bogies as the JR-West 500 series sets. Other differences include LED destination indicator panels, white pantograph side fences, "JR 700" logos on the cab sides, and also different seat designs.

=== Formation ===
The 16-car B sets are formed as follows, with car 1 at the Hakata (west) end.

Car No.	1	2	3	4	5	6	7	8	9	10	11	12	13	14	15	16
Designation	Tc	M2	M'w	M1	M1w	M'	M2k	T's	Ts	M2s	M'h	M1	M1w	M'	M2w	T'c
Numbering	723-3000	727-3000	726-3500	725-3000	725-3300	726-3000	727-3400	718-3000	719-3000	717-3000	726-3700	725-3600	725-3500	726-3200	727-3500	724-3000
Seating capacity	65	100	85	100	90	100	75	68	64	68	63	100	90	100	80	75

Cars 5 and 12 each have one single-arm pantograph.

=== Interior ===
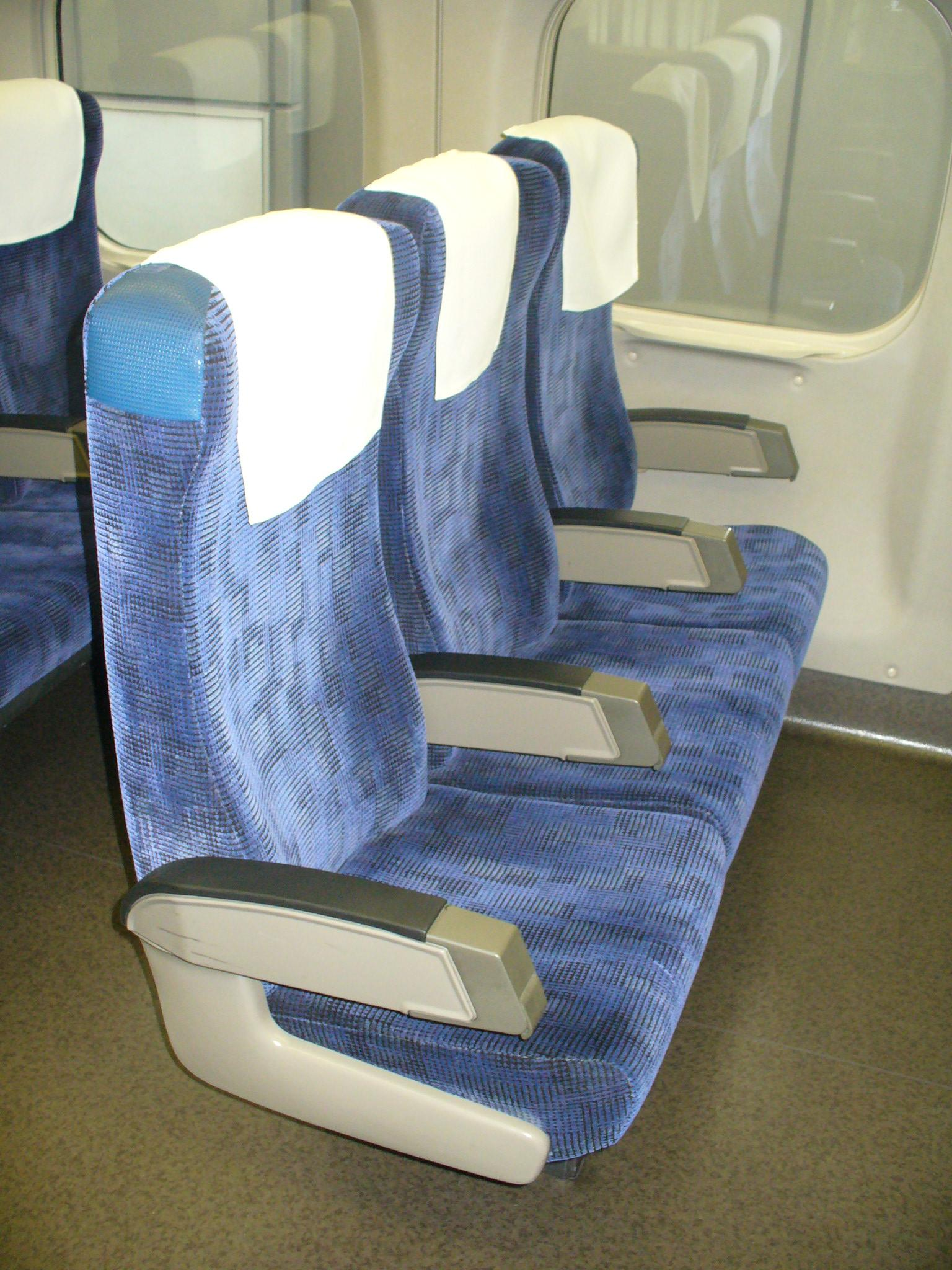
JR-West standard class seating

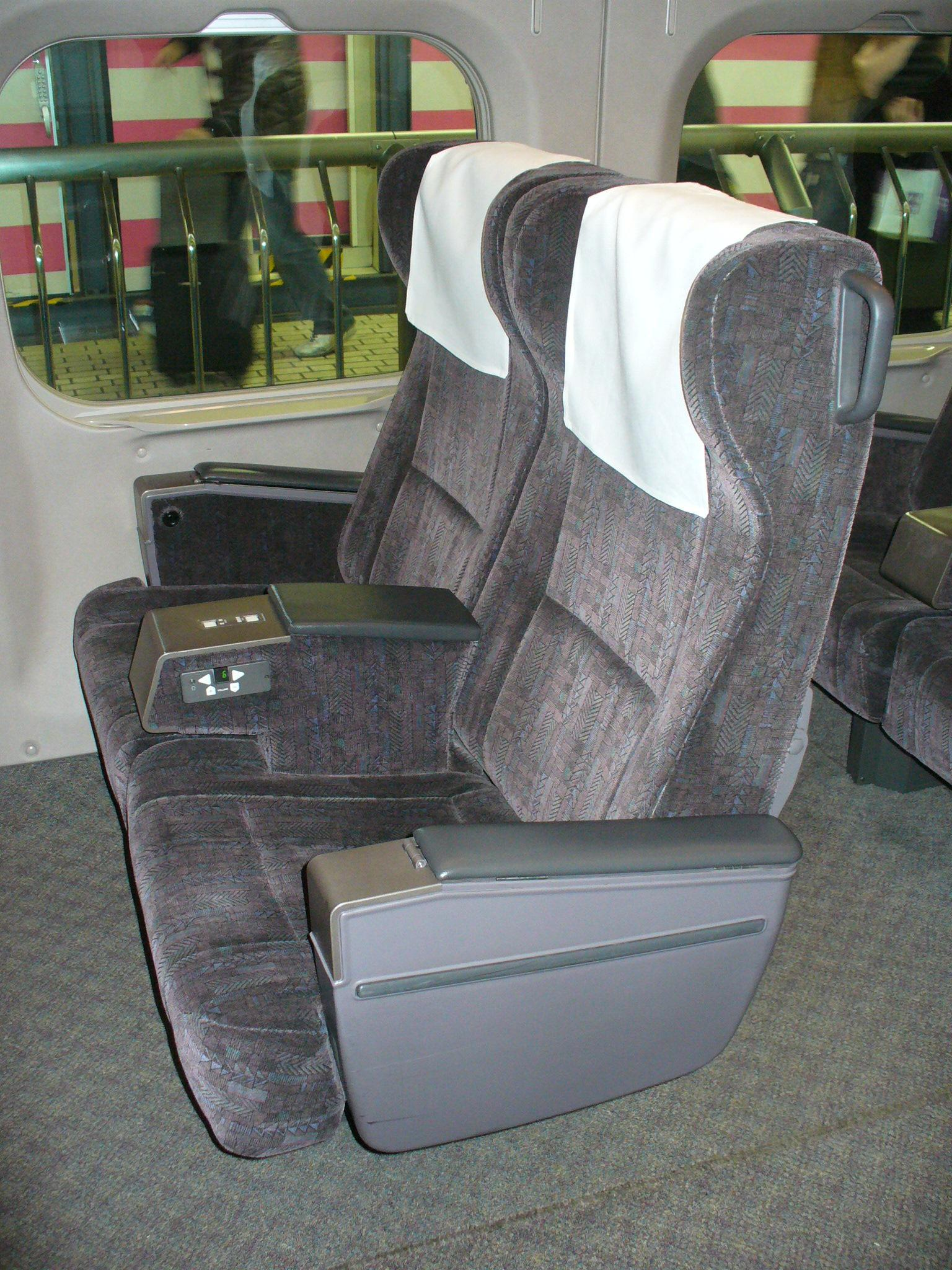
JR-West Green class seating

== 8-car E sets (700-7000 series) ==
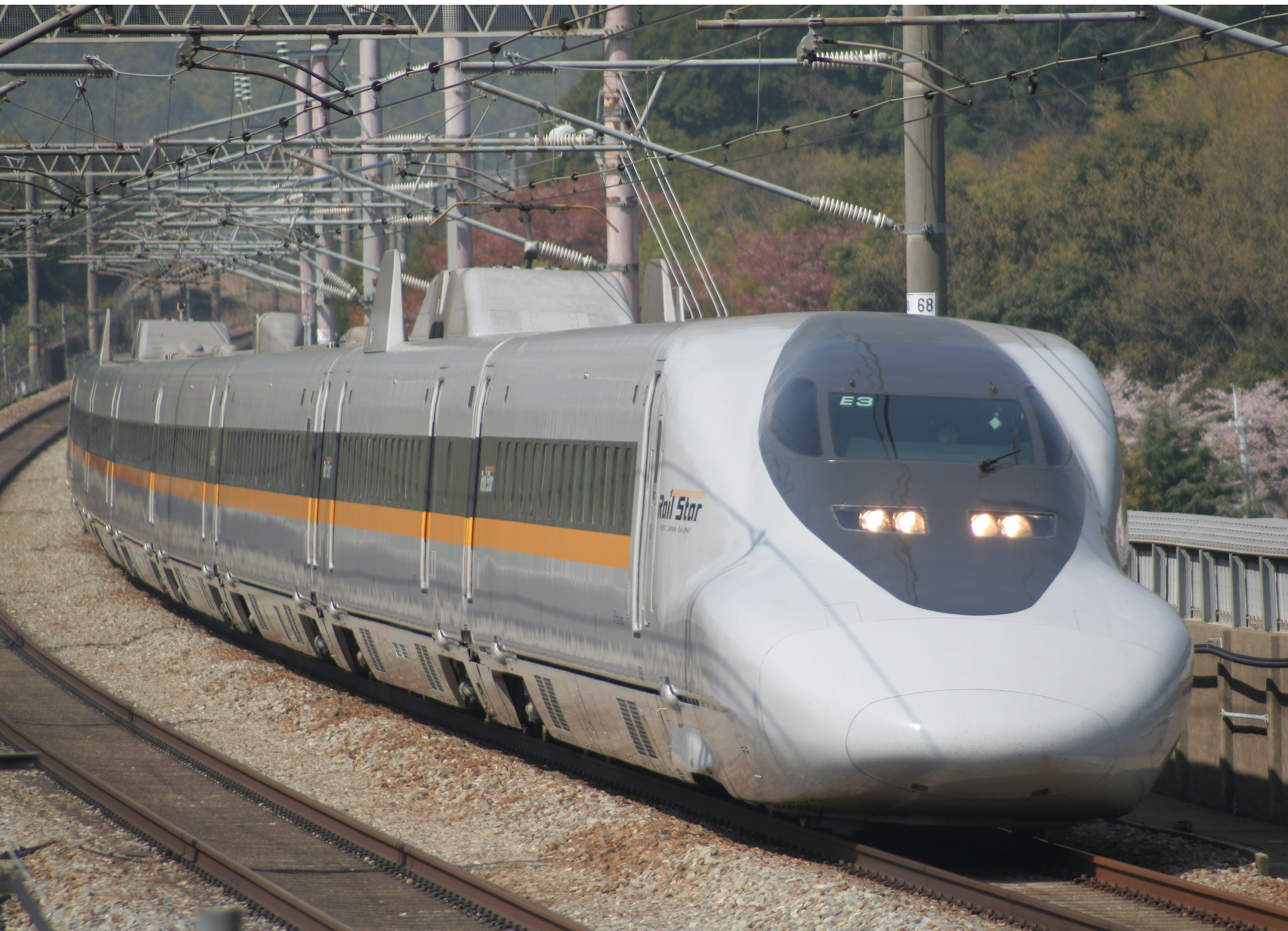
A Hikari Rail Star trainset in April 2009

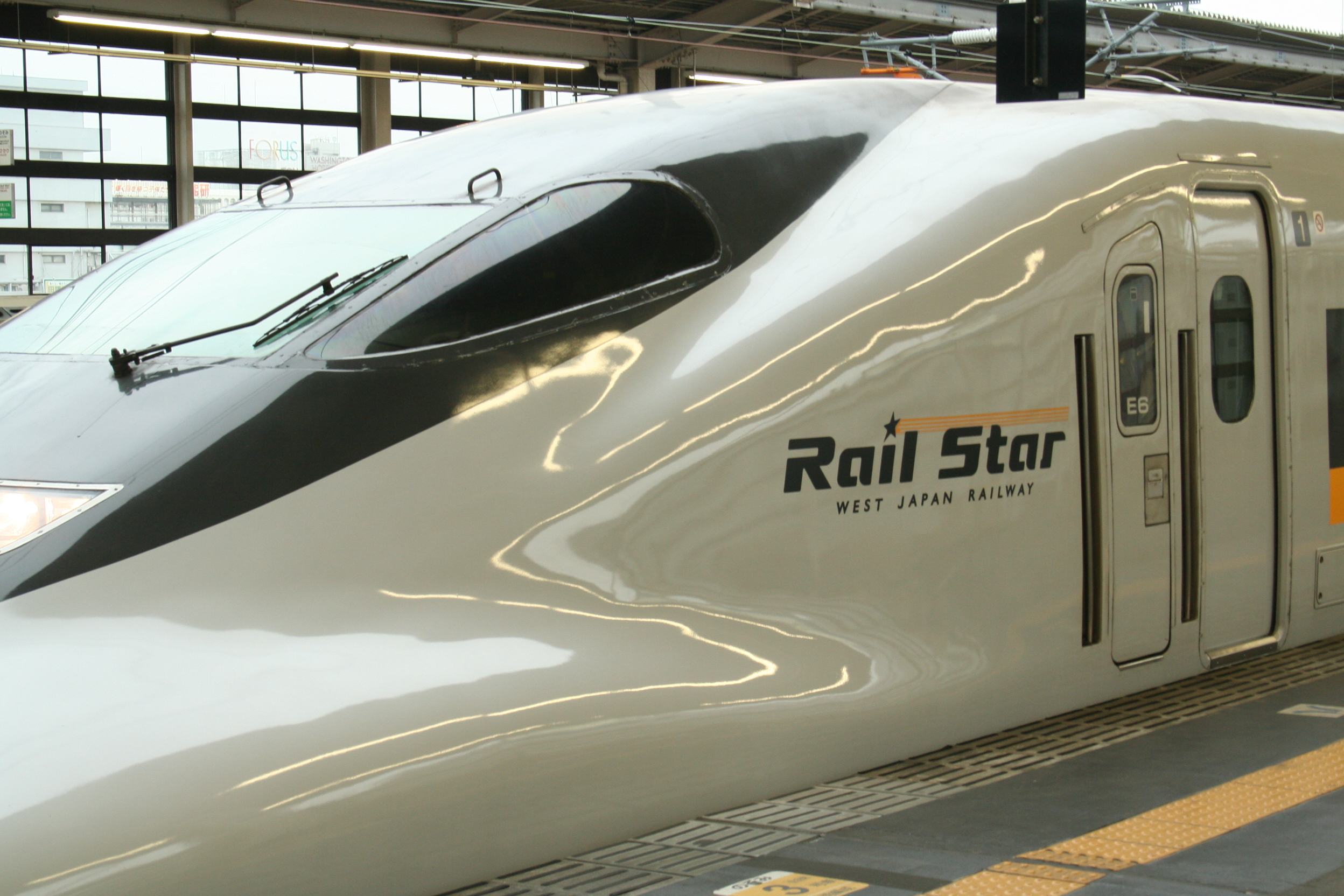
The "Rail Star" logo on set E6 in May 2009

8-car E units were introduced by JR-West for use on new limited-stop Sanyo Shinkansen Hikari Rail Star services between Shin-Osaka and Hakata from 11 March 2000, replacing the former 0 series West Hikari services. The first units were delivered at the beginning of December 1999, with a total of 16 units built. Externally, these units differ noticeably from their JR Central sisters in having a variation of the 500 series livery with the blue waistline band replaced by a band of "sunny yellow". "Rail Star" logos are applied to the sides of alternate cars as well as on the cab sides. Each 8-car train has two single-arm pantographs of a similar design to the JR Central 16-car sets. It was originally planned that sets would be able to operate coupled together, enabling 16-car formations to be run in busy periods, but this feature has never been utilized. With the discontinuation of Hikari services running solely on the San'yo Shinkansen, replaced by Sakura services from 2011, these sets are primarily used on Kodama services between Shin-Osaka and Hakata.

=== Formation ===
The 8-car E sets are formed as follows, with car 1 at the Hakata (west) end).

Car No.	1	2	3	4	5	6	7	8
Designation	Tc	M1	Mpk	M2	M2w	Mp	M1kh	T'c
Numbering	723-7000	725-7600	726-7500	727-7000	727-7100	726-7000	725-7700	724-7500
Seating capacity	65	100	80		72		50	52

Cars 2 and 7 each have one single-arm pantograph.

=== Interior ===
The trains feature four 4-seat compartments in car 8, and the seats at the ends of each car have power supply outlets for mobile PC users. Unlike the 0 series SK sets which they replaced, these sets are completely monoclass without Green class accommodation. However, the five reserved standard class cars, cars 4 to 8, have club class style 2+2 abreast seating compared to the normal 2+3 seating arrangement in the non-reserved cars. Seat pitch is 1,040 mm (41 in) throughout. Car 4 was also designated as a "Silence car", in which onboard announcements were omitted, but this was discontinued from March 2011.

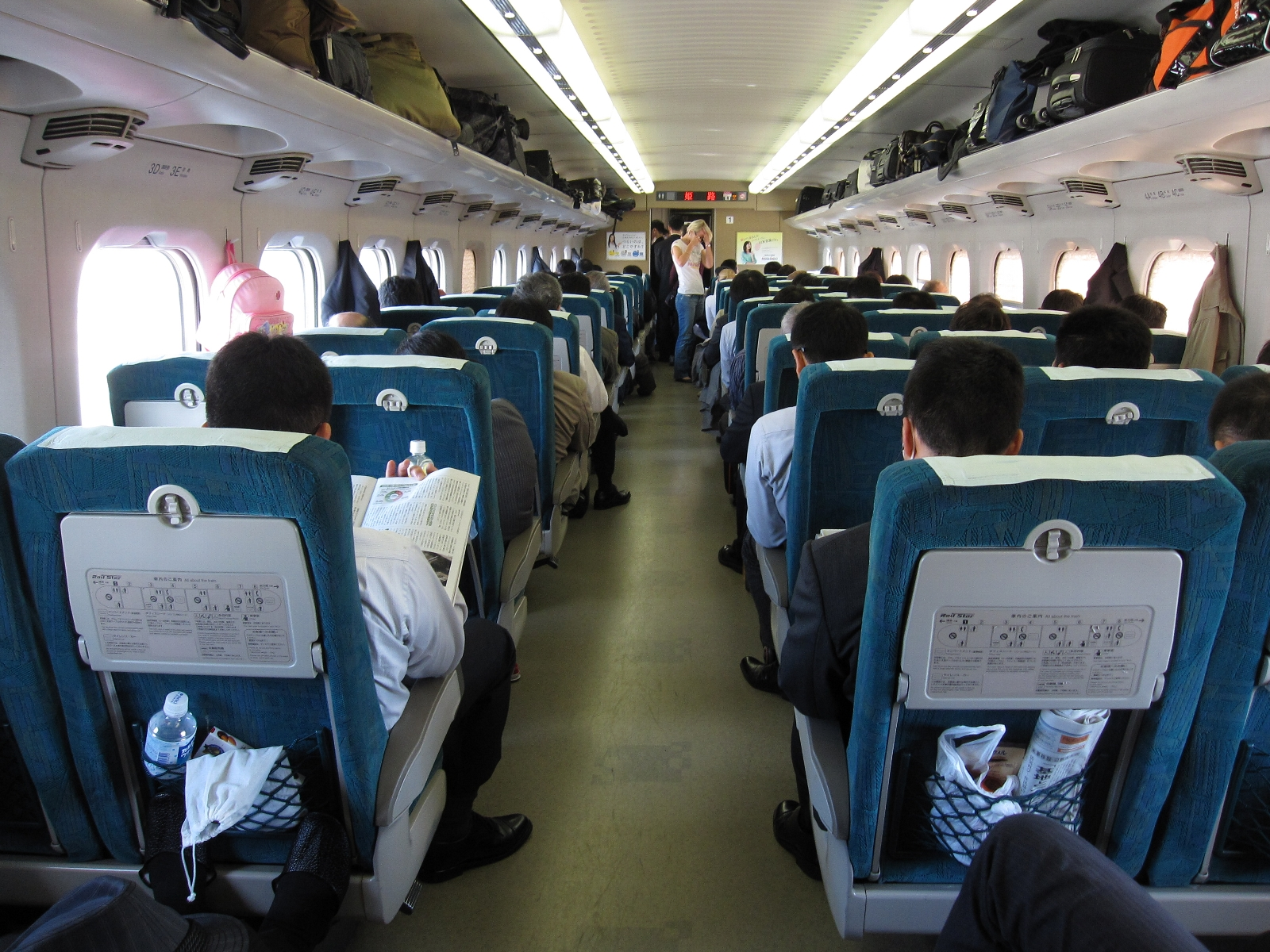
Hikari Rail Star non-reserved car 3+2 seating in November 2009

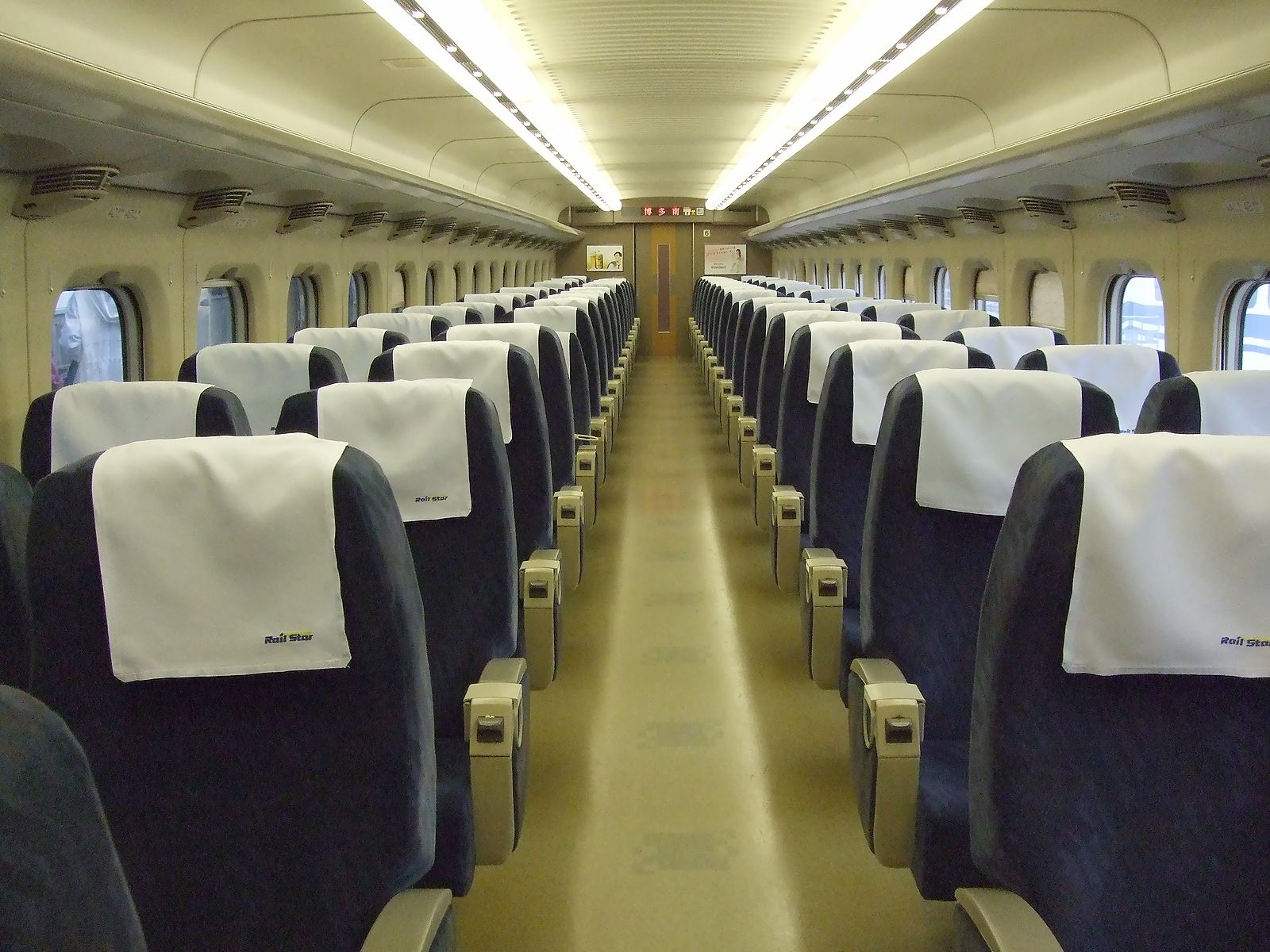
Hikari Rail Star reserved car 2+2 seating in March 2010

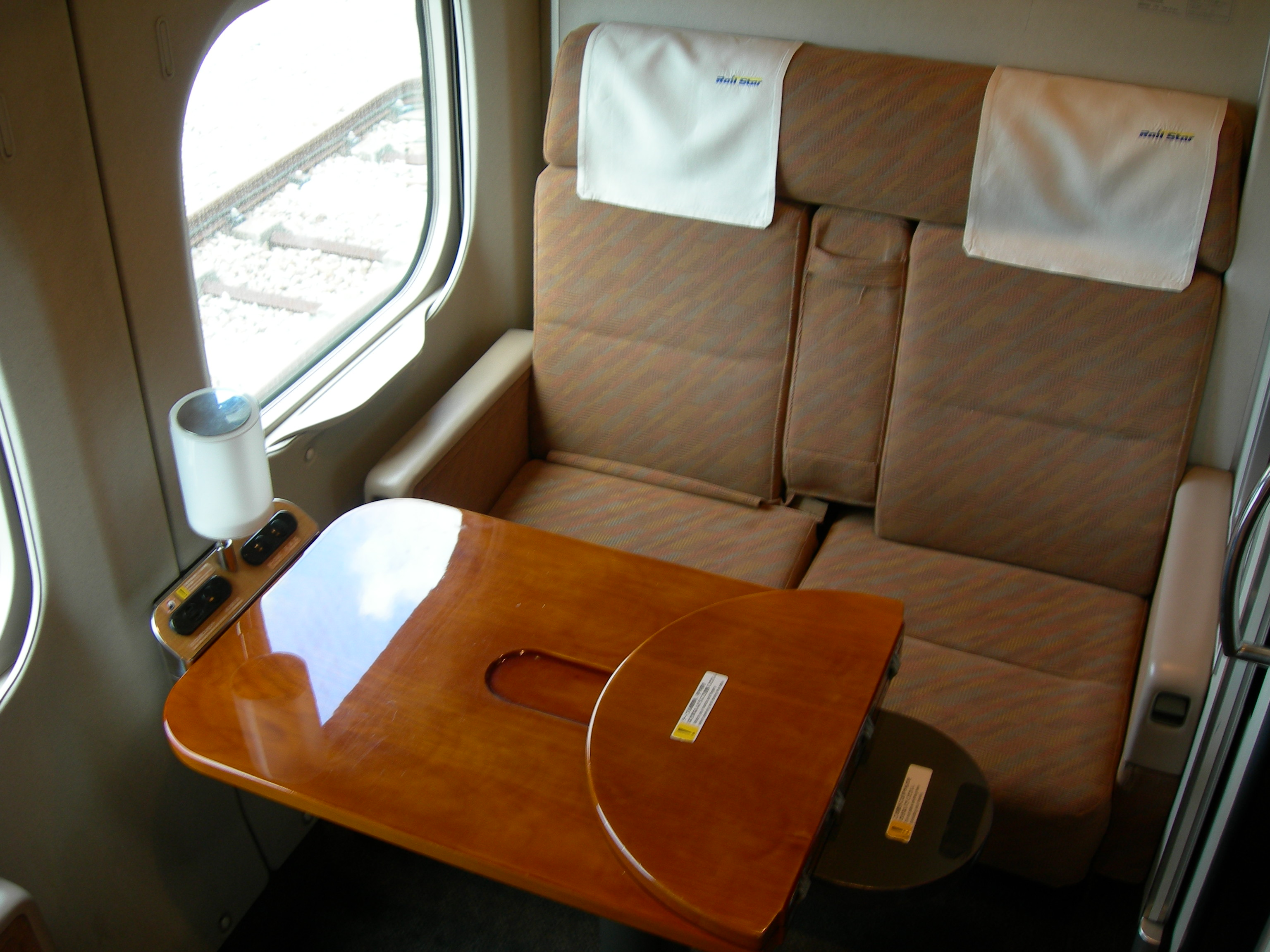
Hikari Rail Star compartment seating in August 2009

=== One Piece Shinkansen ===
On 9 April 2025, JR West unveiled the first of three 8-car trainsets (set E13) to be branded as the One Piece Shinkansen. Operation is scheduled to commence 12 April 2025.

== Fleet history ==
The annual totals for the fleet sizes (number of vehicles as of 1 April each year) owned by JR Central and JR West are as follows.

Year	■ JR Central	■JR West	Total
1998	16	0	16
1999	80	0	80
2000	176	80	256
2001	384	112	496
2002	592	168	760
2003	768	232	1,000
2004	864	312	1,176
2005	960	328	1,288
2006	960	368	1,328
2007	960	368	1,328
2008	960	368	1,328
2009	960	368	1,328
2010	960	368	1,328
2011	960	368	1,328
2012	816	496	1,312
2013	752	496	1,248
2014	640	496	1,136
2015	512	496	1,008
2016	448	464	912
2017	336	368	704
2018	224	320	544
2019	96	256	352
2020	0	144	144
2021	0	128	128
2022	0	128	128

View source data.

== Derivatives ==
Two Class 923 "Doctor Yellow" trains based on the 700 series design are used for track and overhead wire diagnostic work on the Tokaido and Sanyo Shinkansen lines. Both the 800 series and Taiwan High Speed 700T were directly developed from the 700 series. The N700 series and N700S series are also developed from the 700 series.

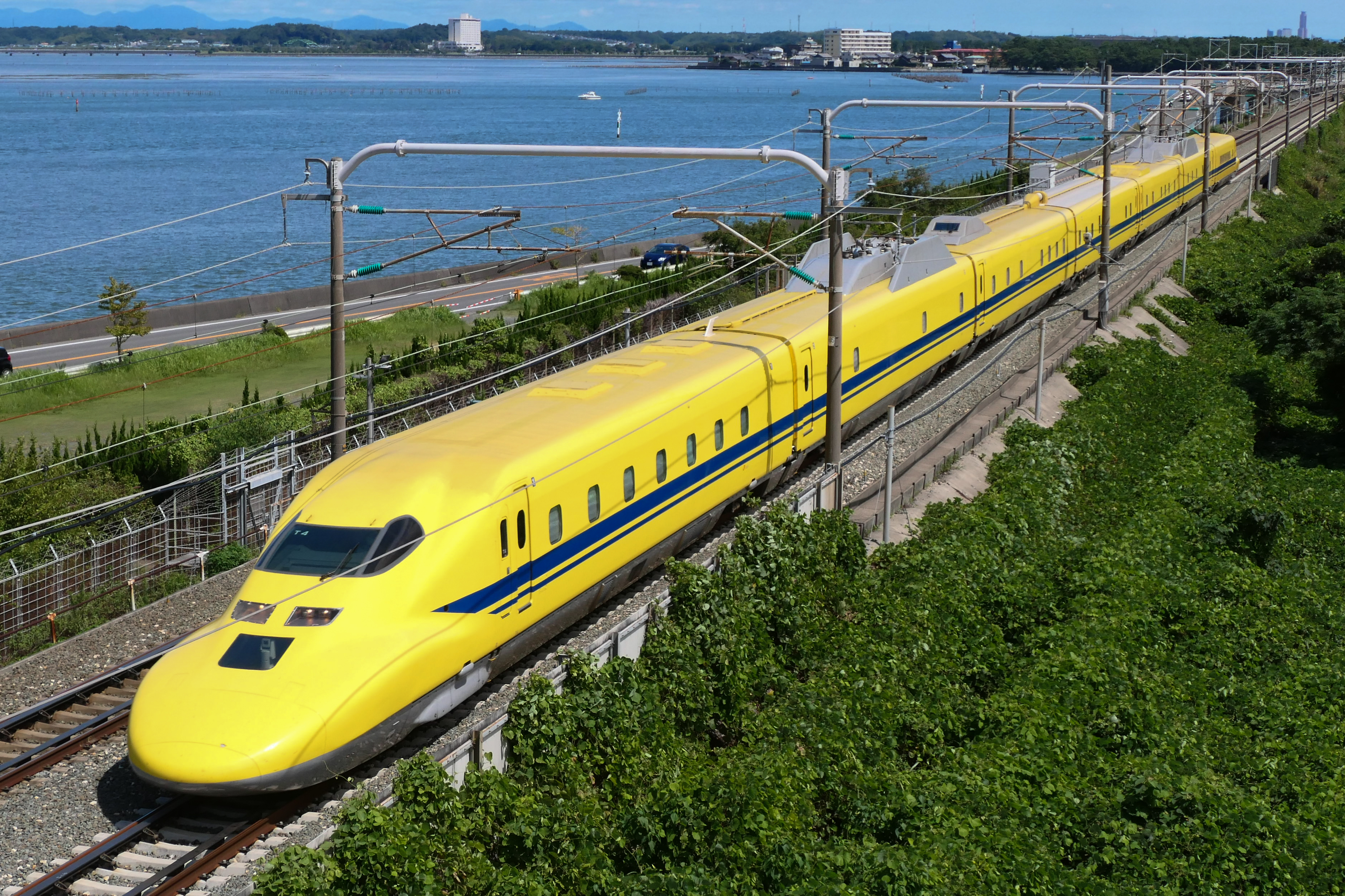
A JR Central Class 923 "Doctor Yellow" train

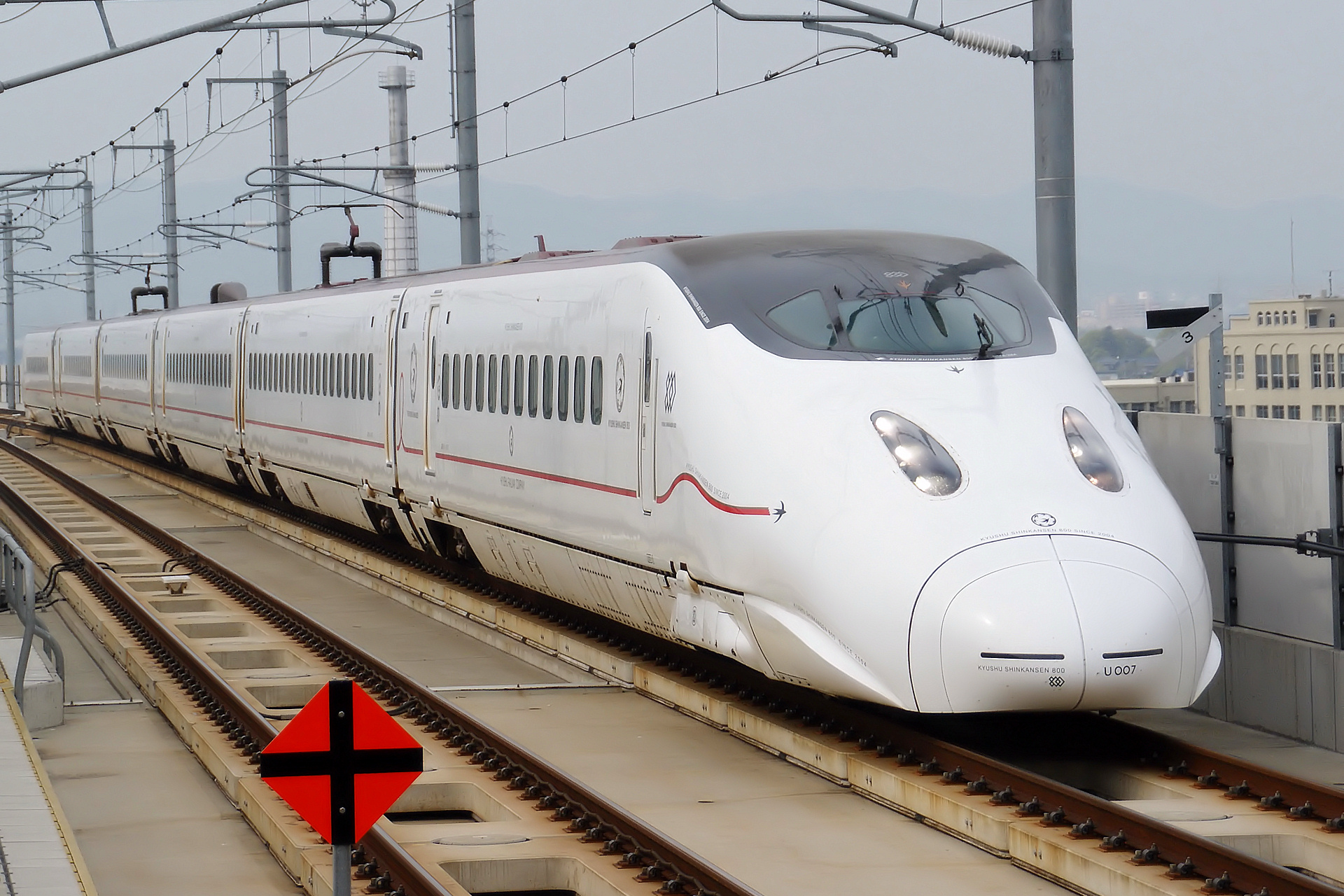
A JR Kyushu 800 Series Shinkansen train

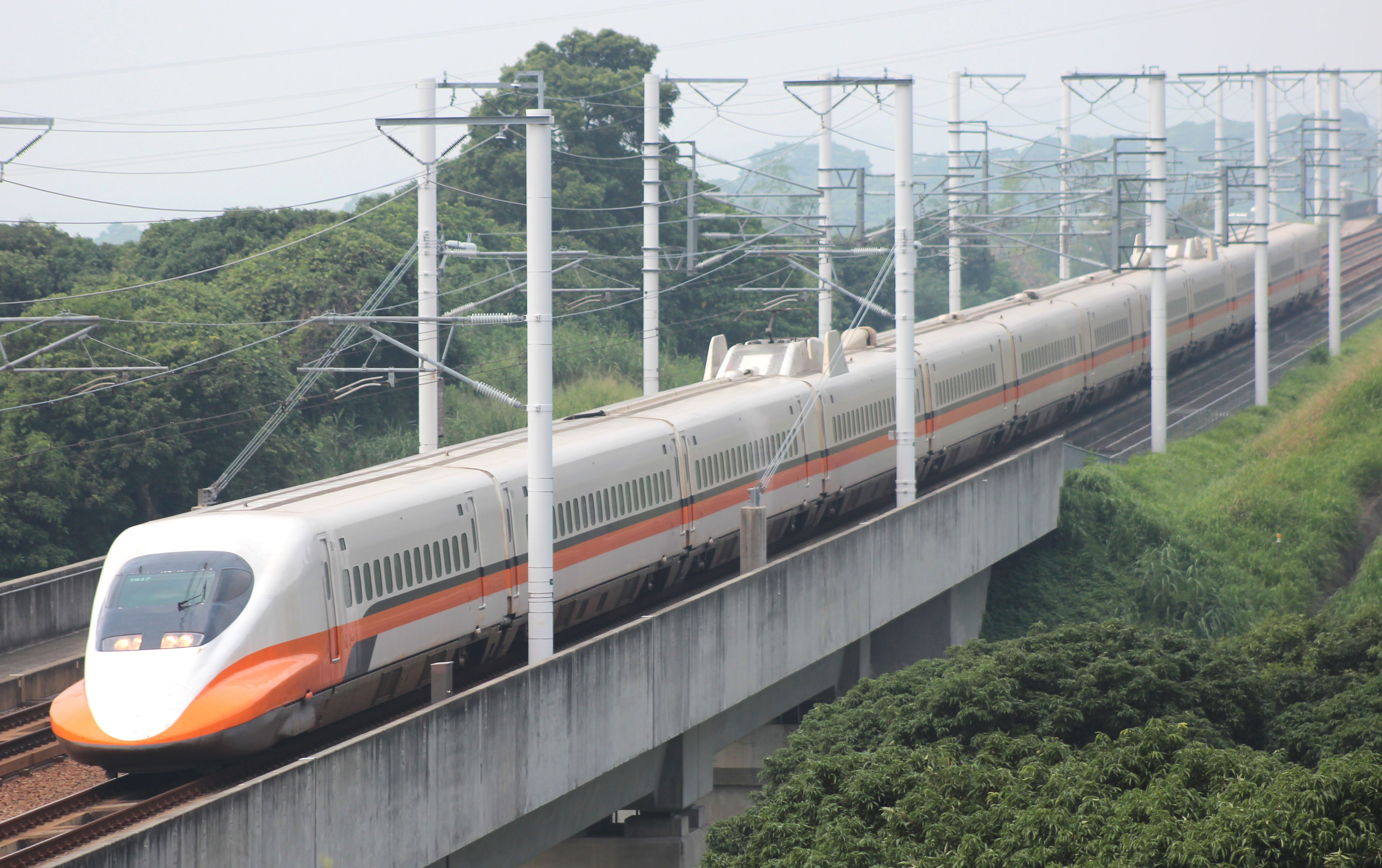
A Taiwan High Speed 700T train

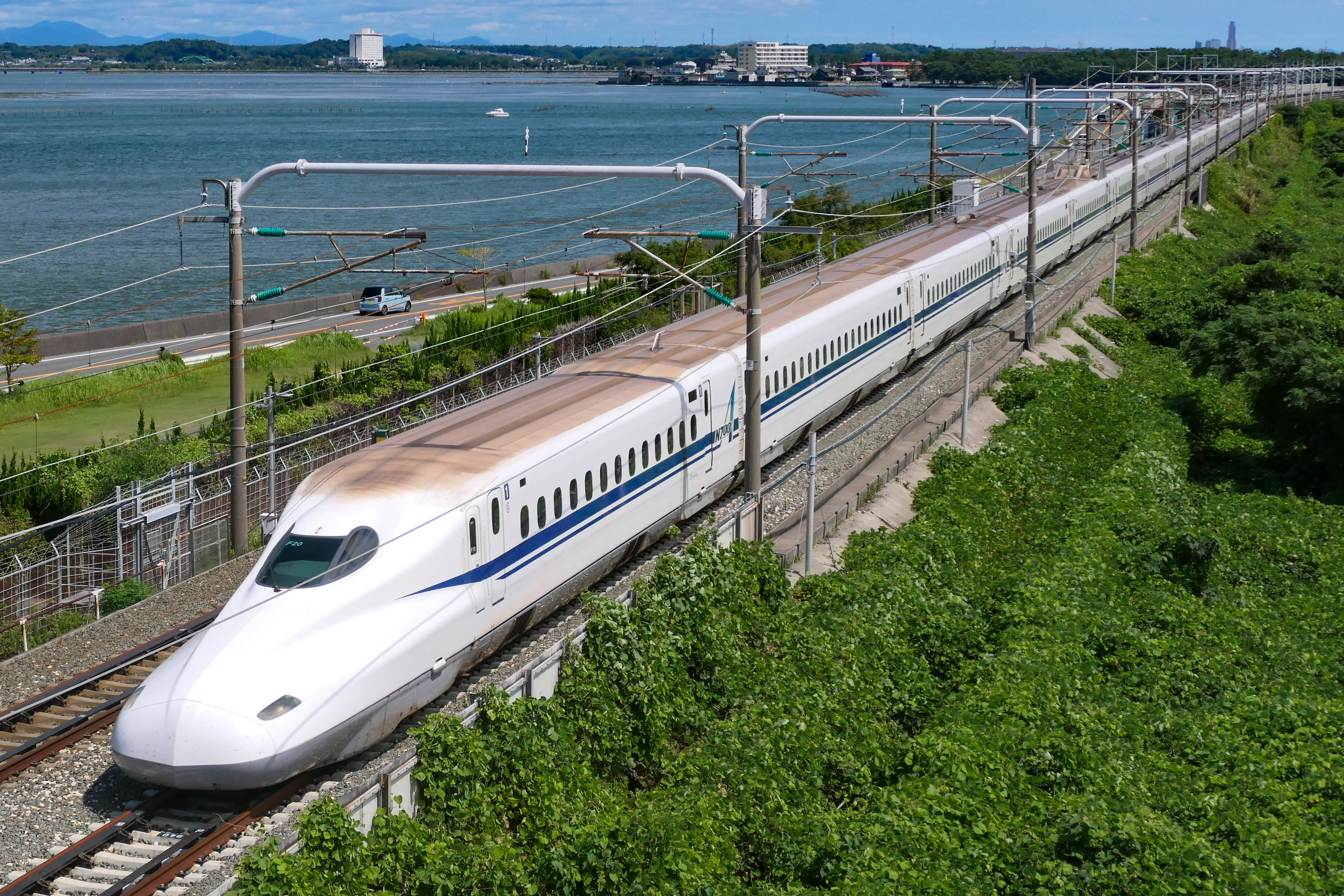
A JR Central N700 Series Shinkansen train

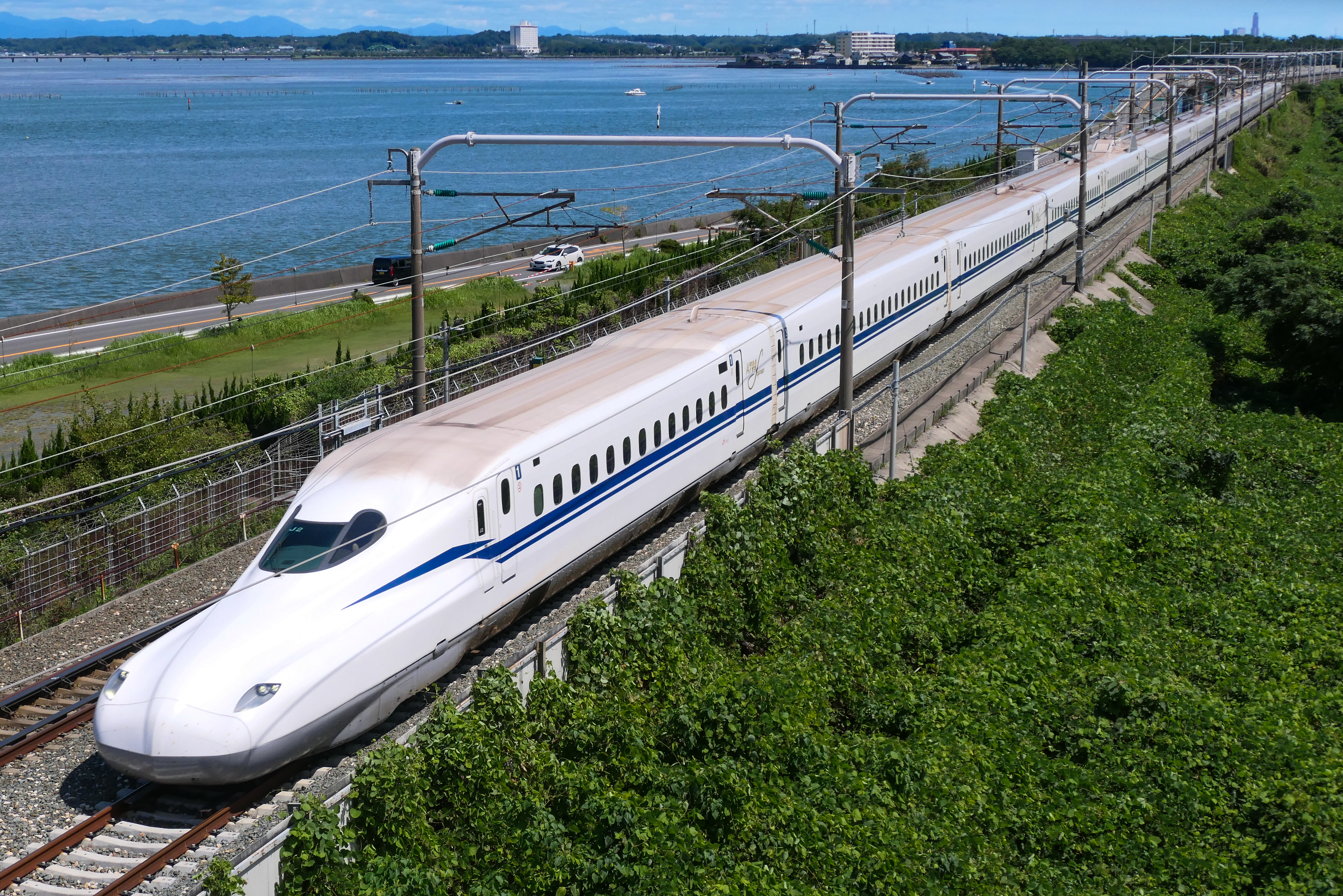
A JR Central N700S Series Shinkansen train

== Accidents and incidents ==
- On June 14, 2018, the Nozomi Superexpress No. 176, operated by 16-car JR West 700 series set B8, collided with a man trespassing on the tracks between Hakata Station and Kokura Station on the San'yō Shinkansen, killing the trespasser instantly and dismembering their body from the impact force. The lead power car sustained substantial damage to its nose. The driver of the train reported hearing an unusual sound at the time of the collision, but continued onward, believing that he had hit an animal and that the incident was too minor to immediately report. The driver of another bullet train service noticed the damage to the train after it had stopped at Kokura, reporting the train's condition to the operation center, but the train continued on its route eastward, departing from the station as normal shortly afterwards. The driver of Superexpress No. 176 was contacted, and the train was brought to a stop and taken out of service for inspection at Shin-Shimonoseki Station in Yamaguchi Prefecture. A visual investigation of the power car found bloodstains on its front, as well as human remains that had been forced inside the damaged area from the force of the collision. Additional remains of the trespasser were found in the vicinity of the Ishisaka tunnel in Yahatanishi-ku, Kitakyushu. Following the incident, JR West reiterated its policy that drivers of bullet trains were to immediately bring the train to a stop and contact the operation center upon the occurrence of any unusual noises, regardless of how severe they believed the cause to be.

== Preserved examples ==
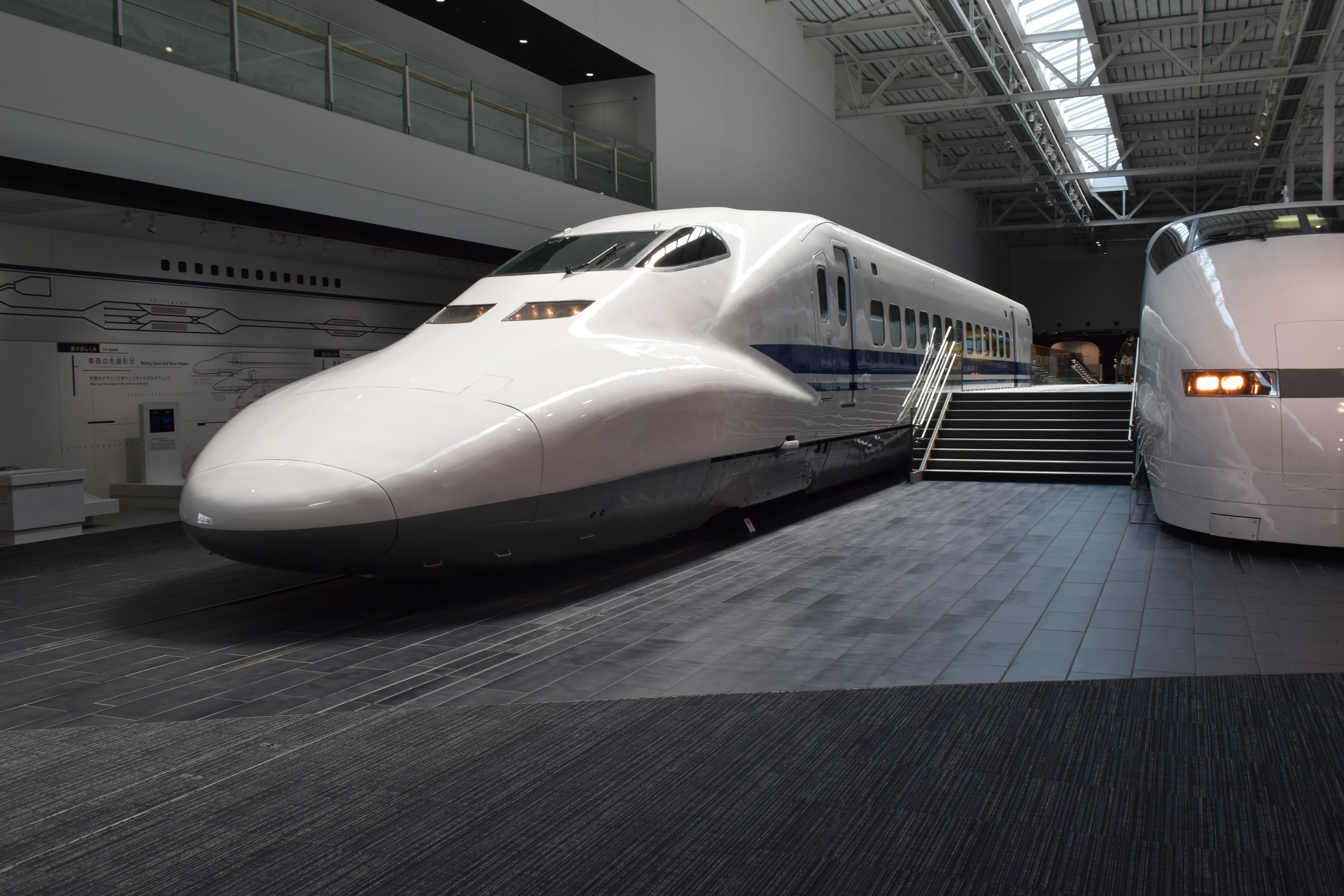
723-9001 at the SCMaglev and Railway Park in April 2014

- 723-9001 (ex-prototype set C1, built 1997 by Kawasaki Heavy Industries) at the SCMaglev and Railway Park, Nagoya, from 2 January 2014.

== See also ==
- List of high speed trains
