= 300 Series Shinkansen =

Japanese high-speed train type

300 series
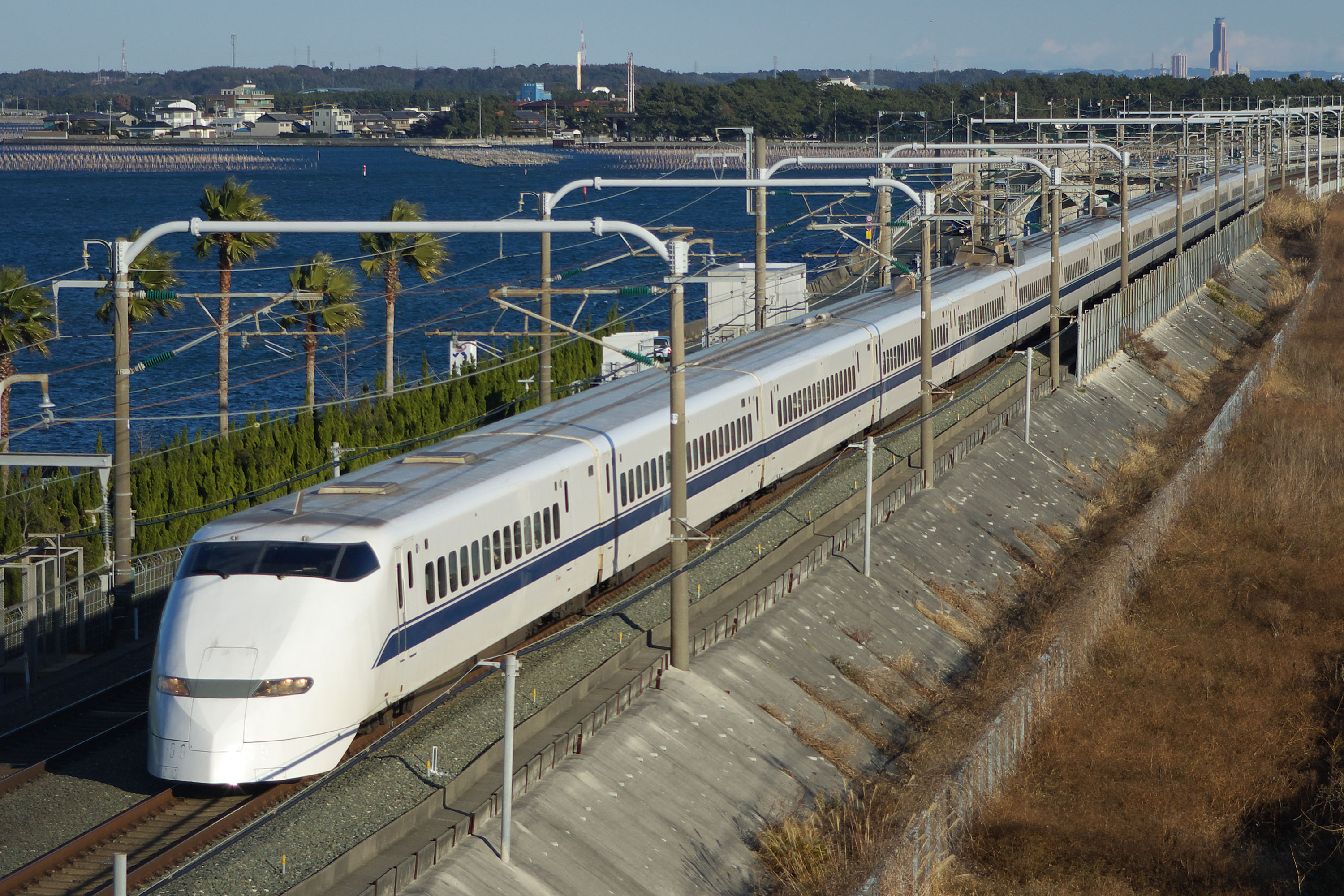
- 300 series train on the Tokaidō Shinkansen
- In service: 1 March 1992 – 16 March 2012 (20 years, 15 days)
- Manufacturers: Hitachi, Kawasaki Heavy Industries, Kinki Sharyo, Nippon Sharyo
- Constructed: 1990–1998
- Scrapped: 2007–2012
- Number built: 1,104 vehicles (69 sets)
- Number preserved: 2 vehicles
- Number scrapped: 1,102 vehicles
- Predecessor: 100 series
- Successor: 700 series, N700 series
- Formation: 16 cars per trainset
- Fleet numbers: J1–J61, F1–F9
- Capacity: 1,323 (200 Green + 1,123 Standard)
- Operators: ■ JR Central (1992–2012); ■ JR-West (1993–2012)
- Depots: Tokyo, Hakata
- Lines served: Tokaido Shinkansen (1992–2012); Sanyo Shinkansen (1993-2012)

Specifications
- Car body construction: Aluminium
- Car length: 25,000 mm (82 ft 0 in) (intermediate cars); 26,050 mm (85 ft 6 in) (end cars)
- Width: 3,380 mm (11 ft 1 in)
- Height: 4,440 mm (14 ft 7 in)
- Doors: Two per side
- Maximum speed: 270 km/h (170 mph)
- Traction system: 40 x 300 kW (402 hp)
- Power output: 12 MW (16,092 hp)
- Acceleration: 1.6 km/(h⋅s) (0.99 mph/s)
- Electric system: 25 kV AC, 60 Hz, overhead catenary
- Current collection: Pantograph
- Safety systems: ATC-1, ATC-NS
- Track gauge: 1,435 mm (4 ft 8 1/2 in) standard gauge

The 300 series (300系, San-byaku-kei) was a Japanese high-speed Shinkansen train type, with a top operational speed of 270 km/h (170 mph), which operated on the Tokaido and Sanyo Shinkansen lines in Japan between 1992 and 2012. When first introduced, they were used on the fastest Nozomi services, being capable of 270 km/h (170 mph). As more were delivered (66 trains by 1998) they replaced earlier units on Hikari service and allowed the thus displaced 100 series units to finally in turn displace 0 series units on almost all services.

With the introduction of newer 700 series equipment, the 300 series sets were gradually demoted to slower Hikari and Kodama services, and were completely withdrawn from Tokaido and Sanyo Shinkansen services by the start of the revised timetable on 17 March 2012.

== Design ==
The front-end styling of these units consisted of a 'curved wedge', replacing the aircraft-style nose-cones of previous Shinkansen trains. The furthest forward point was the very bottom of the pilot. They were painted brilliant white with a medium-thick blue stripe beneath the windows.

They were only formed as sixteen-car sets and had no restaurant cars, though they did originally feature two refreshment counters (later removed).

Technically, they are notable for being the first Shinkansen sets to employ three-phase AC traction motors instead of direct current units, as well as new bolsterless bogies to reduce weight.

The 300 series was awarded the Laurel Prize in May 1993.

== Variants ==
- 300-9000 series: 16-car pre-series set
- 300-0 series: 16-car "J" sets owned by JR Central, introduced from March 1992
- 300-3000 series: 16-car "F" sets owned by JR-West

== Pre-series 300-9000 series set ==
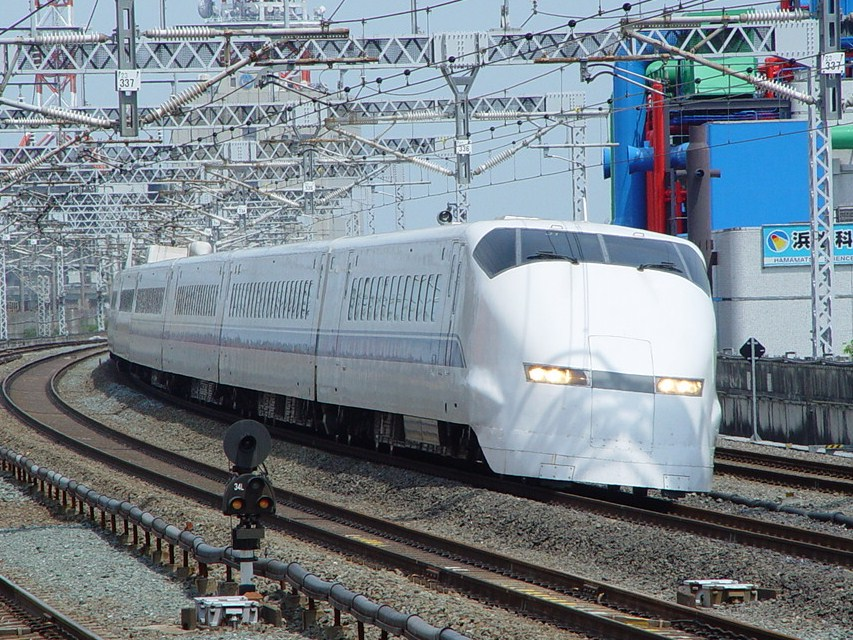
Prototype set J1 near Hamamatsu Station on a test run in April 2003

The pre-series unit, J0, numbered in the 300-9000 series, was delivered on 8 March 1990, and underwent extensive testing and endurance running before the start of the new Nozomi services in March 1992. In the early hours of 1 March 1991, this set recorded a speed of 325.7 km/h on the Tōkaidō Shinkansen between Maibara and Kyōto, a Japanese national speed record at the time.

The set was modified to production standards in March 1993, becoming set "J1", but it differed from the production units in a number of ways. Visually, the driving cab had a different windscreen design, different headlight arrangement, and flared side panels over the front bogies. The prototype set was initially fitted with five pantographs, but this was later reduced to two in line with modifications to the production fleet. Limited water tank capacity meant that the unit was not capable of running return trips from Tokyo to Hakata, and was normally restricted to Tokyo to Osaka/Okayama/Hiroshima workings.

From 2001 onwards, this unit was converted for use as a JR Central test train for testing new digital ATC equipment on the Tokaido Shinkansen. It was finally withdrawn in March 2007. All cars except one end car, 322-9001, were cut up.

== JR Central J sets ==
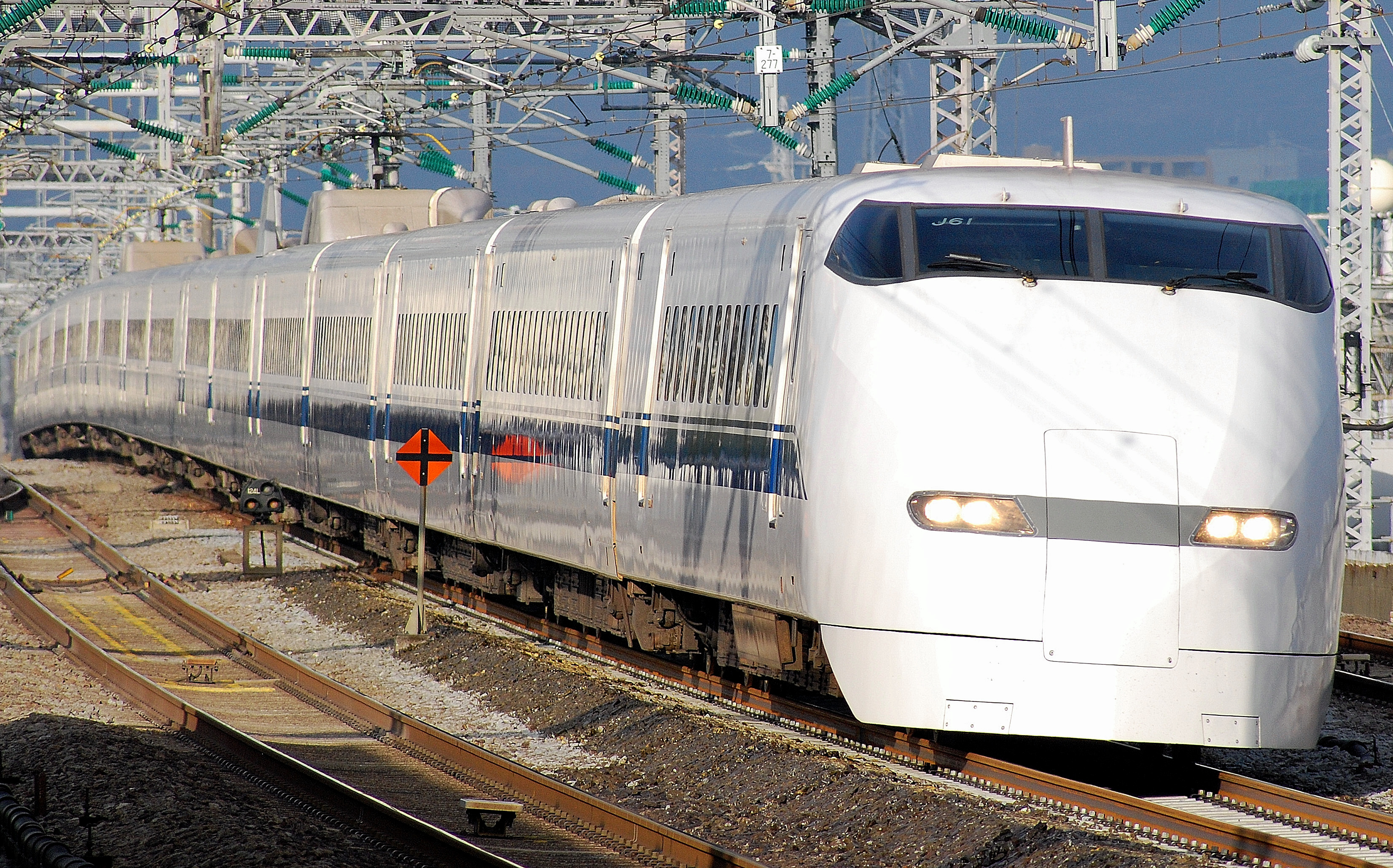
JR Central set J61 in February 2011

60 16-car sets (excluding pre-series set J1) operated by Central Japan Railway Company (JR Central). These sets were delivered between February 1992 and October 1998.

In December 1998, set J59 was fitted experimentally with new 700 series style single-arm pantographs and fairings to reduce noise and air resistance. Following testing, JR Central subsequently fitted new pantographs to all of its sets, with modifications completed by late 2002.

In October 2004, JR Central announced plans for ride improvement modifications to its 300 series fleet involving the addition of semi-active vibration control units to seven cars out of the total of sixteen in each set (end cars 1 and 16, pantograph cars 6 and 12, and Green cars 8 to 10), and also new non-linear air suspension on all cars in each set. The new secondary suspension offered firmer support against lateral movement. The entire fleet operated by JR Central received the modifications by February 2007.

With the entry into service of new N700 series trains, withdrawals of production 300 series sets began in July 2007 with the withdrawal of set J14.

The remaining fleet of JR Central 300 series sets were removed from regular scheduled services from 1 February 2012, and were completely withdrawn following the final runs on 16 March 2012.

=== Formation ===
The 16-car J sets were formed as follows, with car 1 at the Hakata end.

Car No.	1	2	3	4	5	6	7	8	9	10	11	12	13	14	15	16
Designation	Tc	M1	Tpw	M2	M1w	Tp	M2k	M1s	Tps	M2s	M1h	Tp	M2w	M1	Tpws	M2c
Numbering	323	325	329	326	325-500	328	326-400	315	316	319	325-700	328	326-500	325	329-500	322
Seating capacity	65	100	85	100	90	100	75	68	64	68	63	100	90	100	80	75

Cars 6 and 12 each had one single-arm pantograph.

=== Interior ===
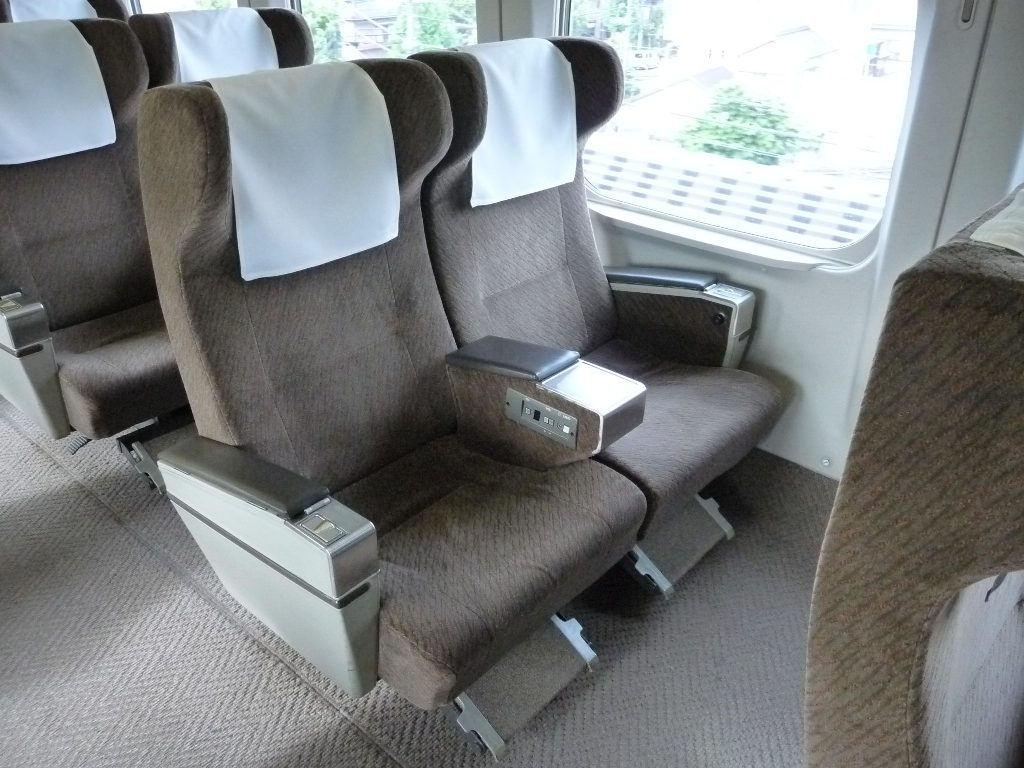
JR Central (J set) Green class seating

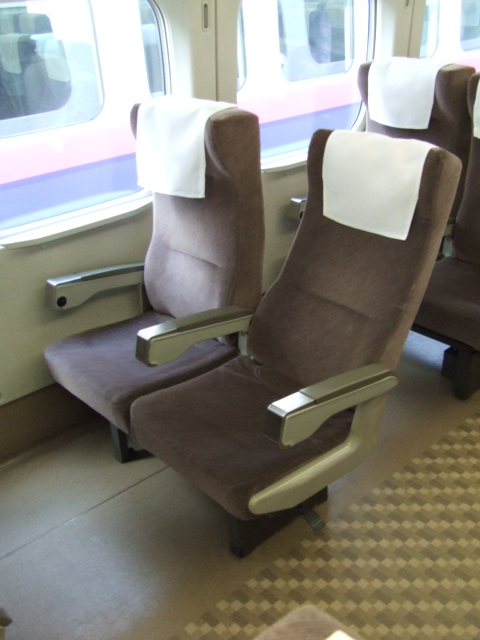
JR Central (J set) standard class seating

== JR-West F sets (300-3000 series) ==
These were 16-car 300 series sets operated by West Japan Railway Company (JR-West). A total of nine sets were delivered between December 1992 and September 1993.

Withdrawals of the JR-West F sets began in July 2011, with the withdrawal of set F5. The last remaining sets were withdrawn by spring 2012 and replaced by eight 700 series "C" sets transferred from JR Central.

=== Formation ===
The 16-car F sets were formed as follows, with car 1 at the Hakata end.

Car No.	1	2	3	4	5	6	7	8	9	10	11	12	13	14	15	16
Designation	Tc	M1	Tpw	M2	M1w	Tp	M2k	M1s	Tps	M2s	M1h	Tp	M2w	M1	Tpws	M2c
Numbering	323-3000	325-3000	329-3000	326-3000	325-3500	328-3000	326-3400	315-3000	316-3000	319-3000	325-3700	328-3000	326-3500	325-3000	329-3500	322-3000
Seating capacity	65	100	85	100	90	100	75	68	64	68	63	100	90	100	80	75

Cars 6 and 12 each had one single-arm pantograph.

=== Interior ===
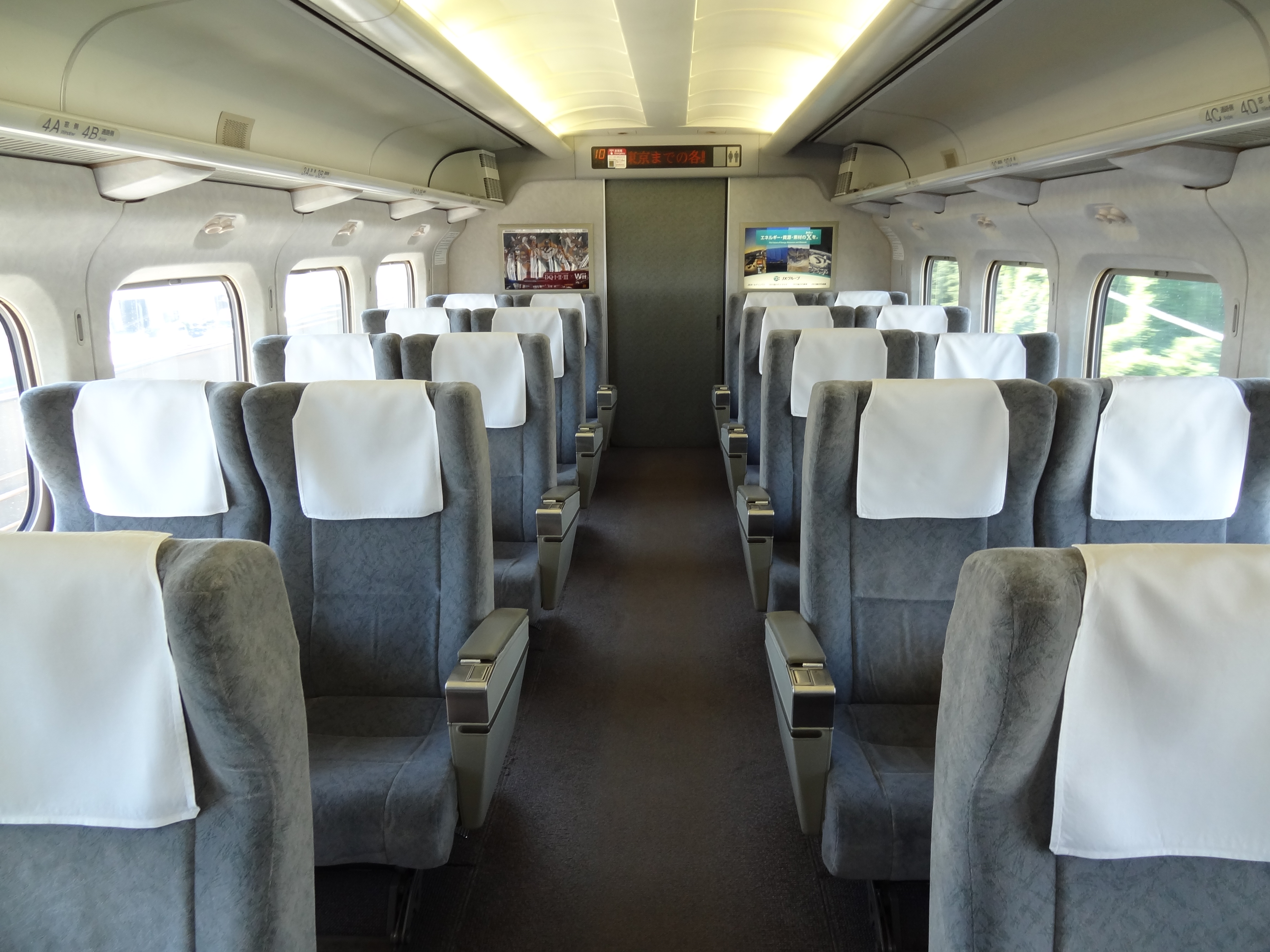
Green car (car 10) interior in September 2011

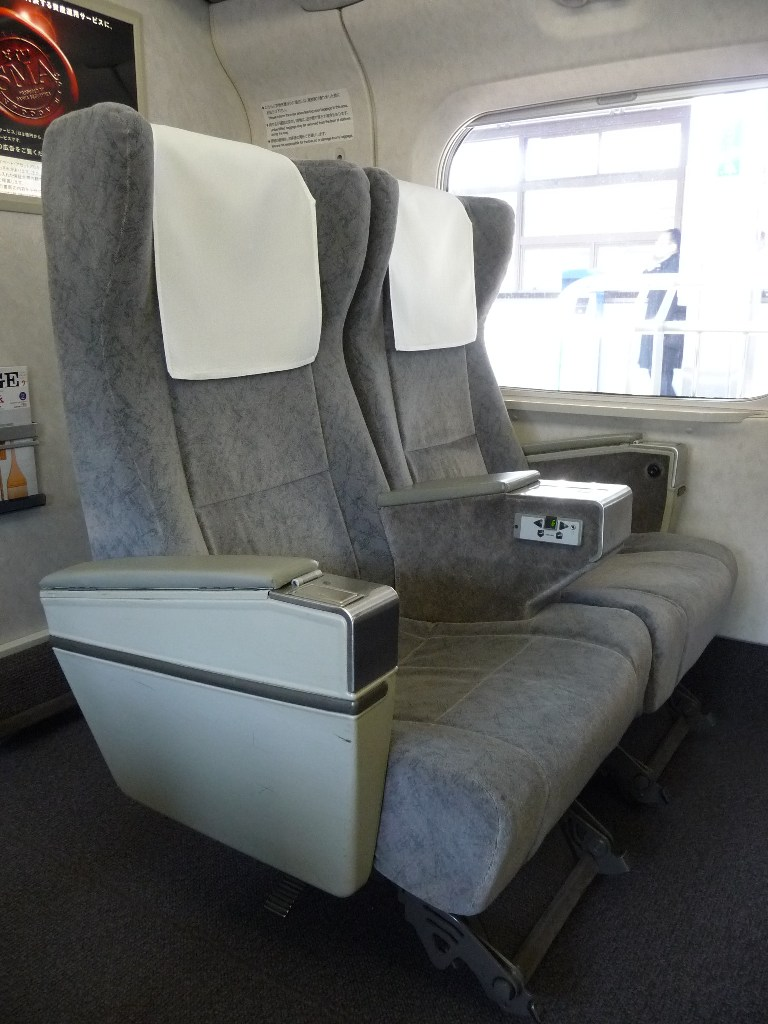
JR-West (F set) Green class seating

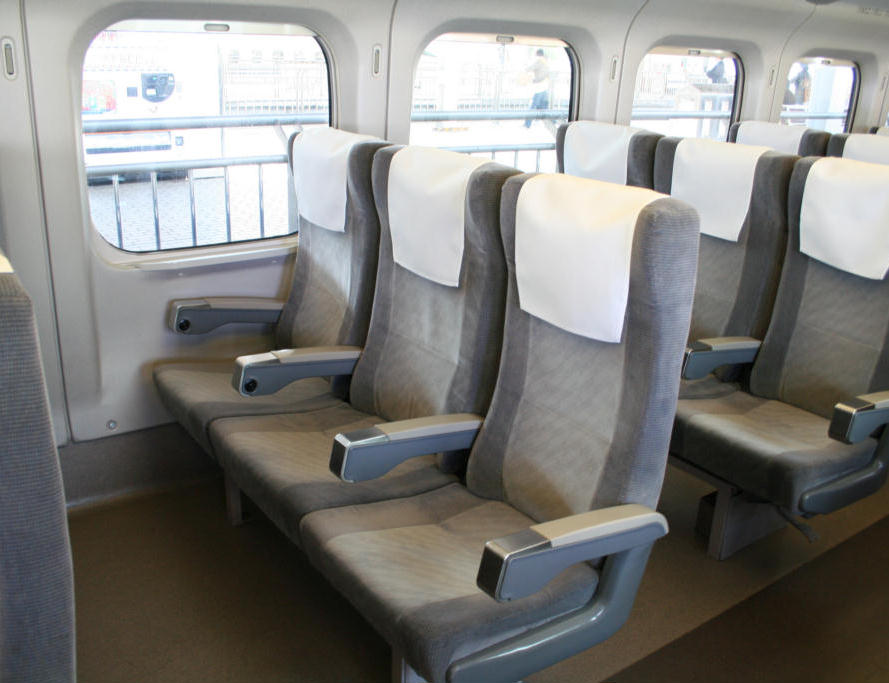
JR-West (F set) standard class seating

== History ==
- January 1988: Development project commenced.
- 8 March 1990: Pre-series 300-9000 series set (J0) was delivered.
- April 1990: Test running started.
- October 1990: Speed of 303.1 km/h was recorded during test running.
- 1 March 1991: Speed of 325.7 km/h was recorded during test running.
- July 1991: Endurance test running started. (Continued until March 1992.)
- February 1992: First production set (J2) was delivered.
- March 1992: Entry into service on Tokaido Shinkansen Nozomi services running at a maximum speed of 270 km/h.
- June 1992: 300-9000 series set was tested on Sanyo Shinkansen.
- December 1992: First JR-West 300-3000 series (F) set was delivered.
- March 1993: Hourly through Nozomi services were introduced between Tokyo and Hakata.
- 10 March 1993: Pre-series set J0 was modified to full-production standard and renumbered J1.
- May 1993: Awarded the Laurel Prize in May 1993.
- April 1994: Sets from J16 onward delivered with regular sliding doors in place of earlier plug doors.
- August 1995: Sets from J30 onward delivered with two pantographs in place of the earlier three. Modifications started on earlier sets to reduce number of pantographs to two.
- March 1996: Maximum speed of Hikari services was raised to 270 km/h.
- October 1998: 300 series production ended.
- September 1999: Modifications started (from set J9) to convert pantographs to single-arm type with shrouds resembling 700 series design.
- December 2001: 300 series removed from regularly scheduled Nozomi services.
- July 2007: First 300 series set (J14) was withdrawn from service.
- July 2011: First JR-West F set (F5) was withdrawn from service.
- 16 March 2012: The last remaining sets were withdrawn following their last runs.

== Preserved examples ==
- 322-9001 (ex-prototype set J1, built 1990 by Hitachi) at the SCMaglev and Railway Park, Nagoya, since March 2011.
- 323-20 (ex-set J21, built 1993 by Nippon Sharyo) formerly at the SCMaglev and Railway Park, Nagoya, from March 2011, removed in December 2013.
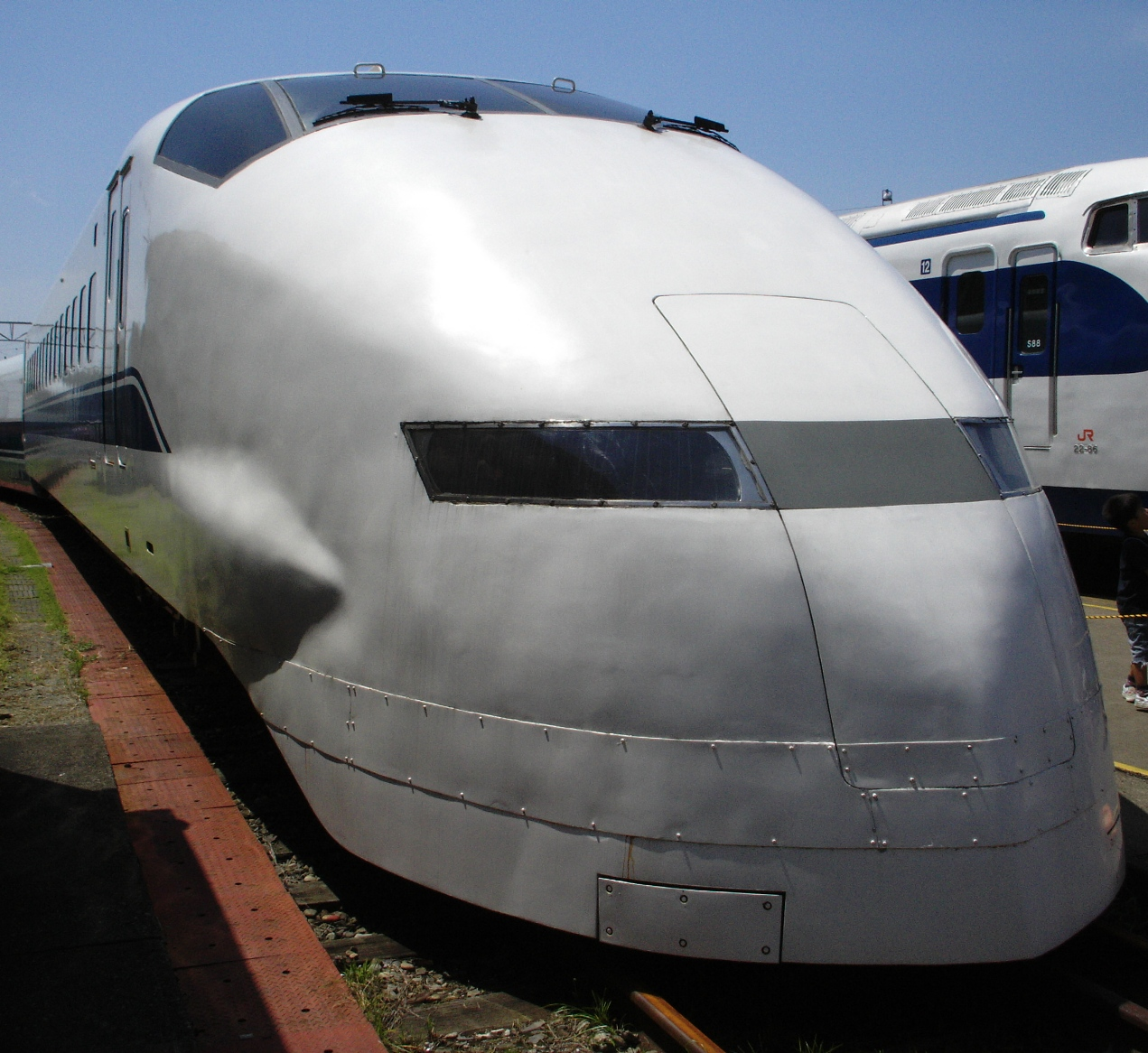
Preserved car 322-9001 of prototype set J1 at Hamamatsu Works in July 2007

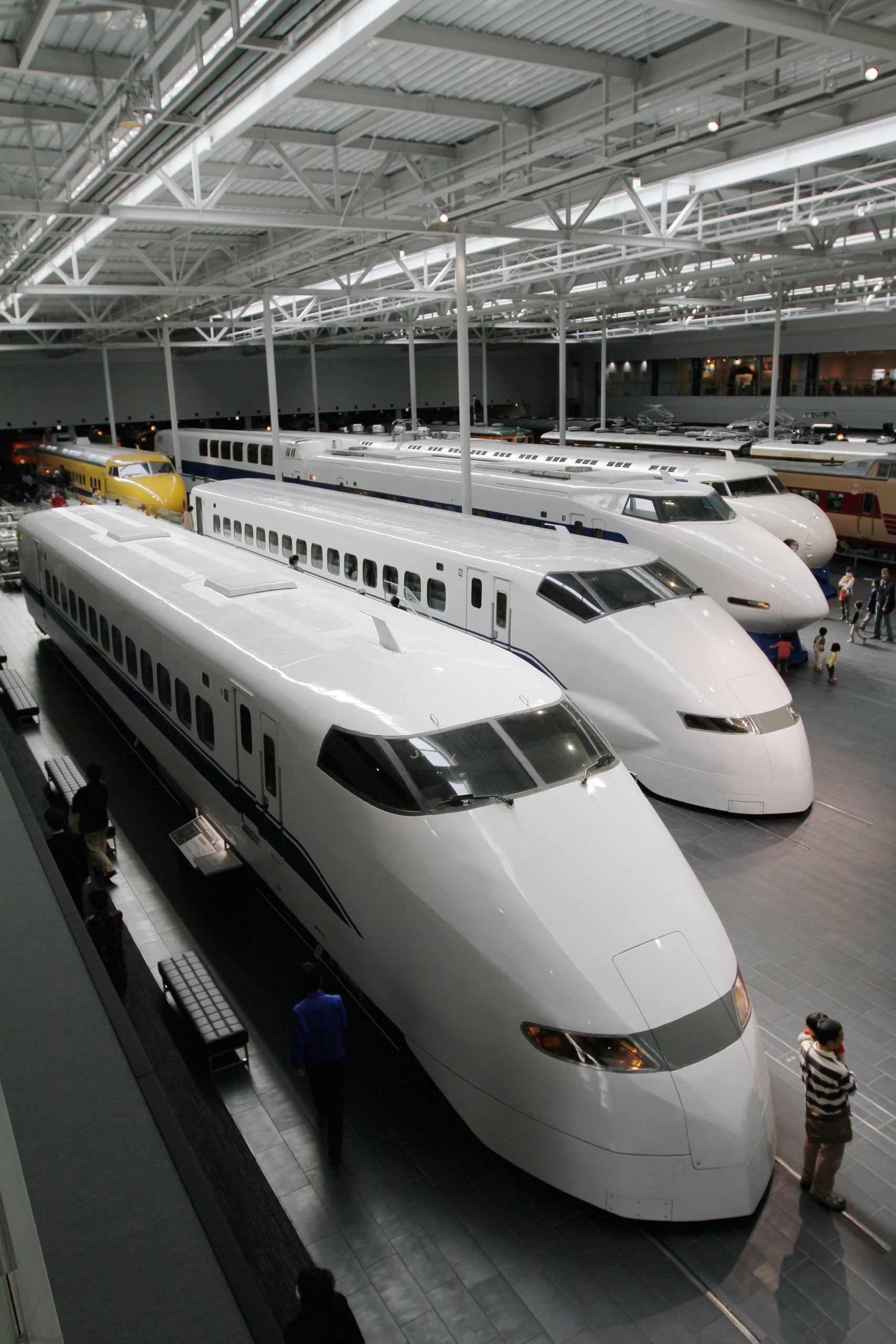
Preserved car 323-20 (foreground) and 322-9001 at SCMaglev and Railway Park in March 2011

== See also ==
- List of high speed trains
