= Hakataminami Station =

Railway station in Kasuga, Fukuoka prefecture, Japan

Hakataminami Station 博多南駅
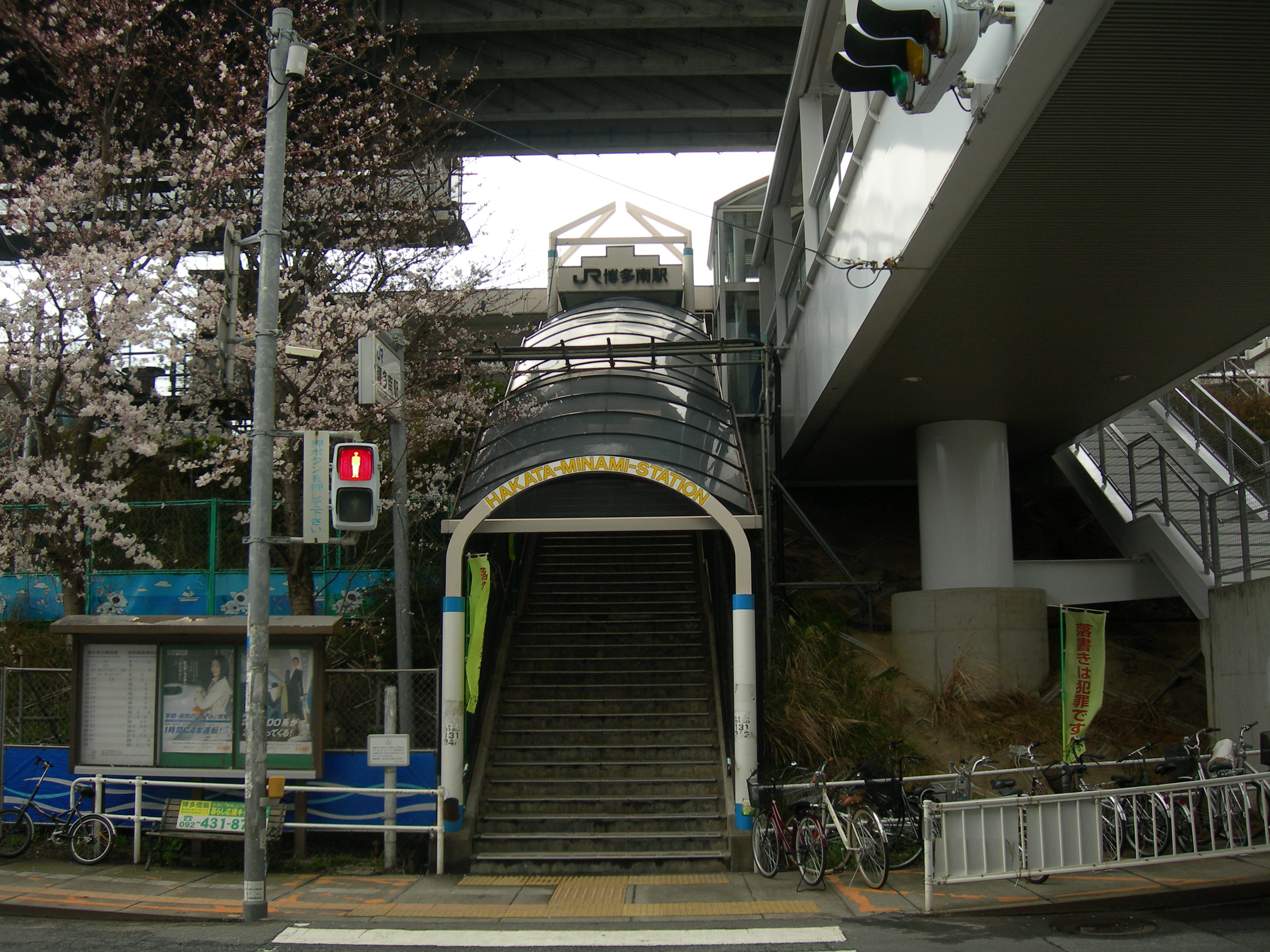
- Hakataminami Station entrance in March 2008

General information
- Location: 8-166 Kami-shirouzu, Kasuga, Fukuoka; Japan
- Coordinates: 33°31′04″N 130°26′13″E
- Operator: JR West
- Line: Hakataminami Line
- Platforms: 1 side platform
- Tracks: 1

Construction
- Structure type: Elevated

History
- Opened: 1 April 1990; 36 years ago

Services
Preceding station	JR West	Following station
Terminus	Hakataminami Line Kodama shuttle	Hakata Terminus
Location
- Location within Fukuoka city Location within Japan

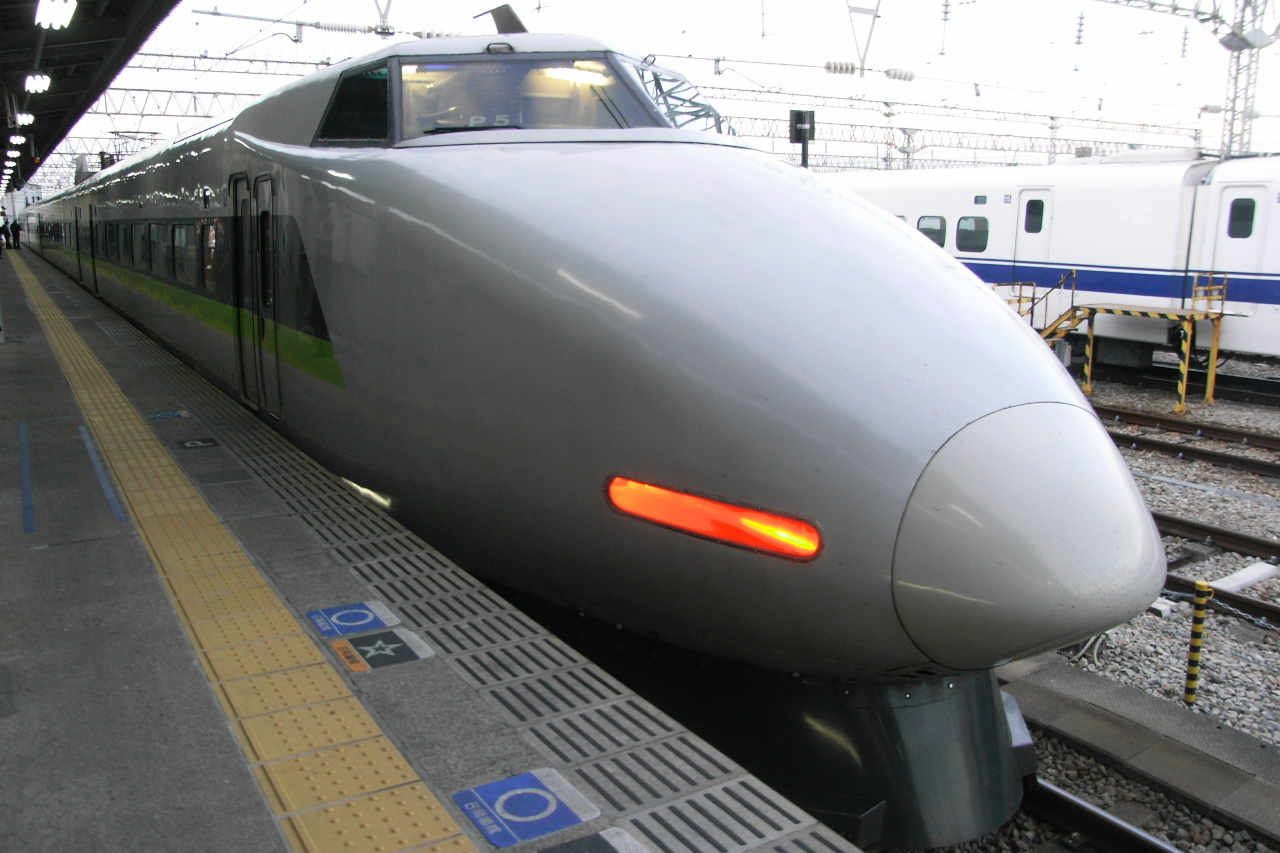
Platform at Hakata-Minami Station (November 2008)

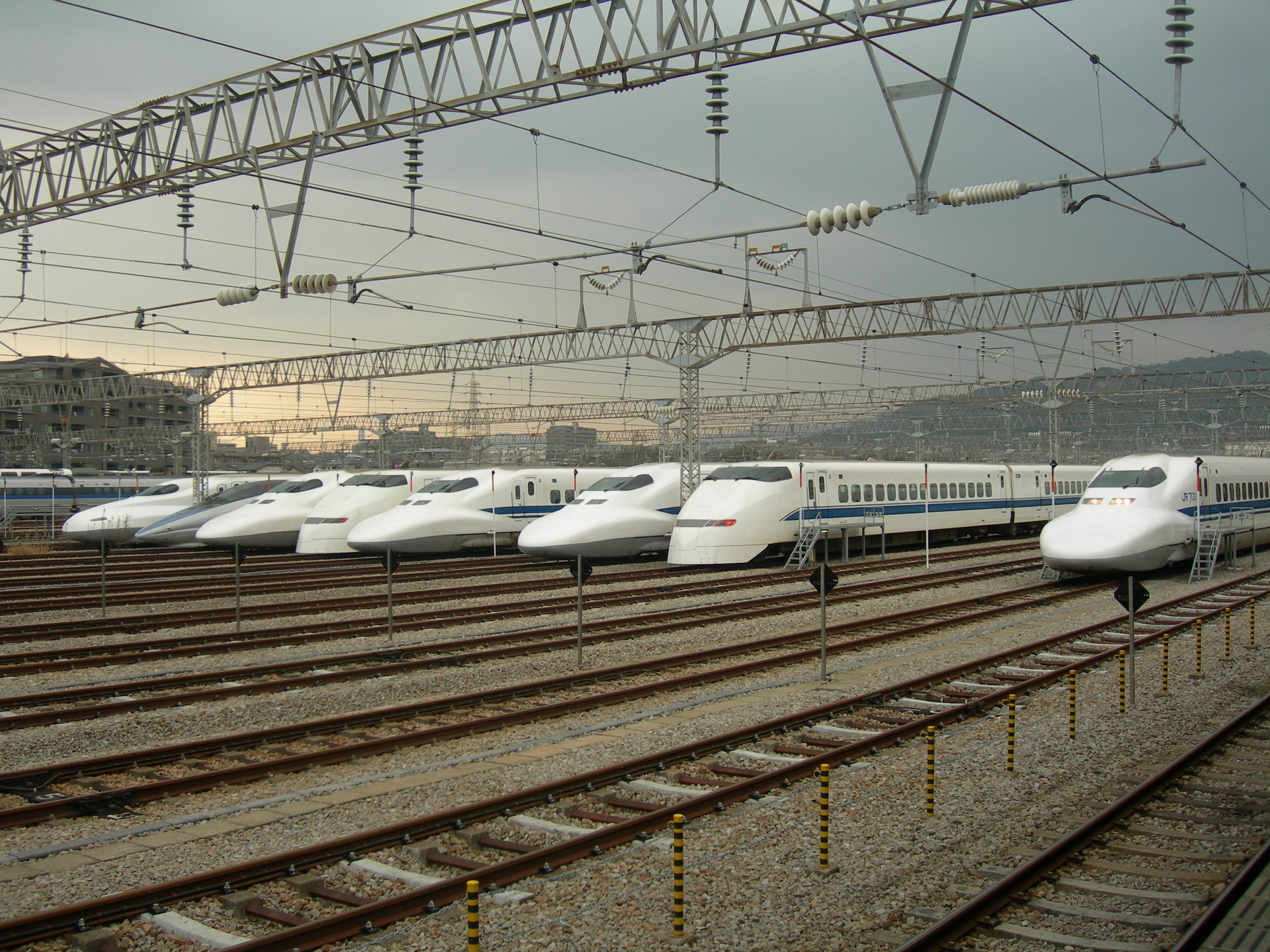
View of Hakata Shinkansen Depot yard from platform of Hakata-Minami Station (March 2008)

Hakataminami Station (博多南駅, Hakataminami-eki) is a railway station on the Hakataminami Line in Kasuga, Fukuoka, Japan. The station is operated by West Japan Railway Company (JR West).

== Lines ==
The station is served by the Hakataminami Line from Hakata Station, and forms the only station on this 8.5 km (5.3 mi) line. Hakataminami Line services are classed as "Limited express", although many are actually extensions of Sanyō Shinkansen Hikari or Kodama services.

== Layout ==
The station consists of one elevated side platform, located adjacent to Hakata Shinkansen Depot.

== History ==
The station opened on 1 April 1990.

== See also ==
- List of railway stations in Japan
