= 0 Series Shinkansen =

Japanese high-speed train type

0 series
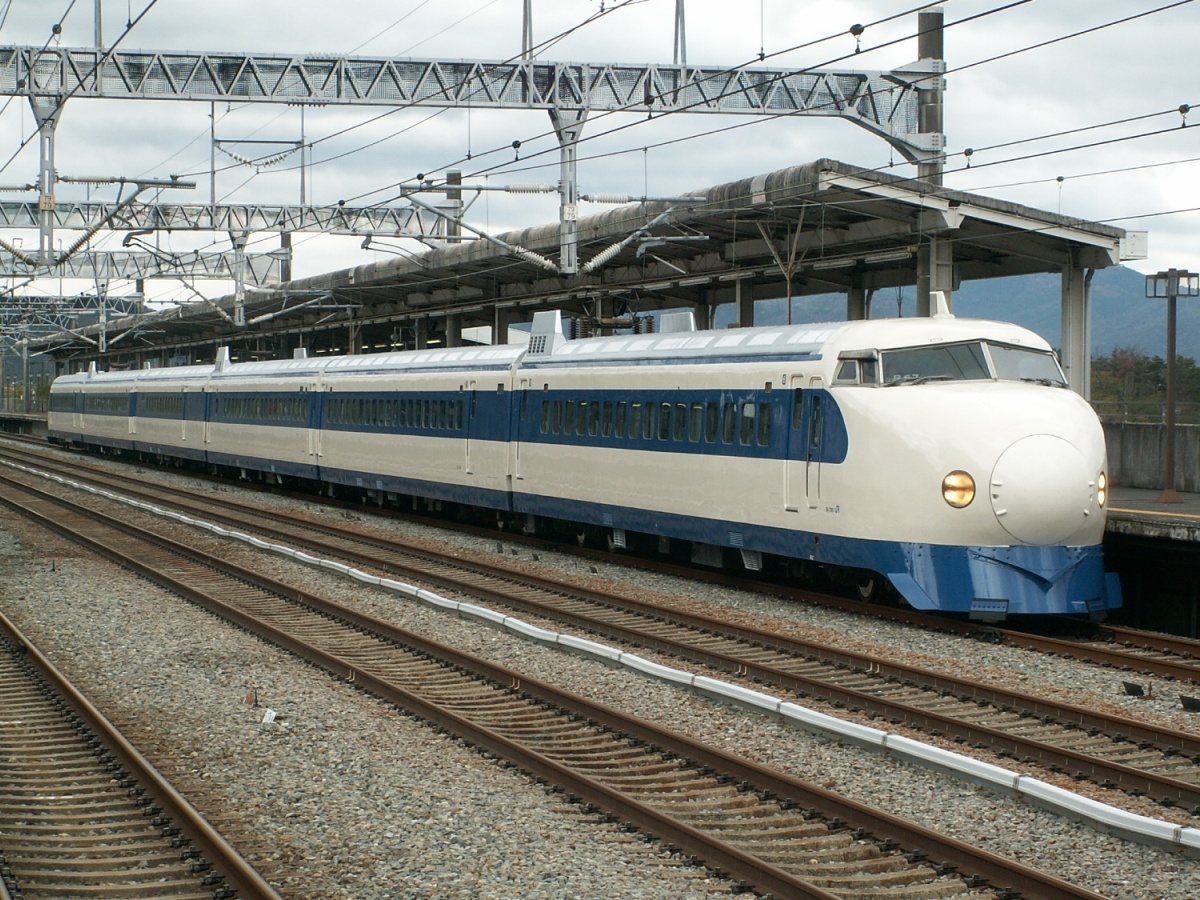
- 0 series 6-car set R67 at Higashi-Hiroshima Station in April 2008
- In service: 1 October 1964 – 14 December 2008 (44 years, 74 days)
- Manufacturers: Hitachi; Kawasaki Sharyo; Kinki Sharyo; Kisha Seizo; Nippon Sharyo; Tokyu Car Corporation
- Constructed: 1963–1986
- Refurbished: 1990–1998
- Scrapped: 1977–2008
- Number built: 3,216 vehicles (201 sets)
- Number preserved: 25 vehicles
- Number scrapped: 2,989 vehicles
- Successor: 100, 300, 500 and 700 series
- Formation: 4, 6, 12 or 16 cars per trainset
- Capacity: 368–1,340
- Operators: JNR (1964–1987); JR Central (1987–1999); JR West (1987–2008)
- Depots: Tokyo, Shin-Osaka, Hakata
- Lines served: Tōkaidō Shinkansen (1964–1999); San'yō Shinkansen (1972–2008); Hakataminami Line (1990–2008)

Specifications
- Car body construction: Steel
- Car length: End cars: 25.15 m (82 ft 6 in); Intermediate cars: 25 m (82 ft)
- Width: 3.383 m (11 ft 1 in)
- Height: 4.49 m (14 ft 9 in)
- Doors: 2 per side
- Maximum speed: 1964–1986: 210 km/h (130 mph); 1986–2008: 220 km/h (140 mph)
- Traction motors: 185 kW (248 hp) brushed DC
- Power output: 11,840 kW (15,880 hp) on a 16-car set
- Transmission: Secondary-side tap changer drive
- Acceleration: 1964–1992: 1.0 km/(h⋅s) (0.62 mph/s); 1992–2008: 1.2 km/(h⋅s) (0.75 mph/s)
- Deceleration: 2.84 km/(h⋅s) (1.76 mph/s)
- Electric system: Overhead line, 25 kV 60 Hz AC
- Current collection: PS 200 pantograph
- Safety system: ATC-1
- Track gauge: 1,435 mm (4 ft 8 1/2 in) standard gauge

Notes/references
- This train won the 8th Blue Ribbon Award in 1965.

The 0 series (Japanese: 0系) was a Shinkansen high-speed train type introduced by Japanese National Railways (JNR) in October 1964 for use on the newly opened Tōkaidō Shinkansen line, the first Shinkansen route. They were later used on the San'yō Shinkansen after it opened in 1972 and the Hakataminami Line after it opened in 1990. A total of 3,216 vehicles, arranged into 201 sets, were built between 1963 and 1986 by Hitachi, Kawasaki Sharyo, Kinki Sharyo, Kisha Seizo, Nippon Sharyo, and the Tokyu Car Corporation.

Following JNR's privatization in 1987, the trains were transferred to the Central Japan Railway Company (JR Central) and West Japan Railway Company (JR West), and many sets were refurbished during their service lives before being withdrawn in 2008 after 44 years of service.

== History ==
The 0 series trains (which were not originally classified, as there was no need to distinguish classes of trainset until later) entered service with the start of Tōkaidō Shinkansen operations in October 1964. These units were white with a blue stripe along the windows and another at the bottom of the car body, including the front pilot.

Unlike previous Japanese trains on the national network, the Tōkaidō Shinkansen and all subsequent Shinkansen lines are 1,435 mm (4 ft 8 1/2 in) standard gauge between the rails. The trains were powered by 25 kV AC electricity at 60 Hz with all axles of all cars powered by 185 kW (248 hp) traction motors, giving a 220 km/h (137 mph) operation top speed.

The original trains were introduced as 12-car sets, with some sets later lengthened to 16 cars. Later, shorter trains of six and even four cars were assembled for lesser duties.

Shinkansen sets are generally retired after fifteen to twenty years. Due to declining fiscal performances of JNR, and labor unwillingness to develop new types, more 0 Series units were produced to replace earlier batches from 1976–77 onwards. Production continued until 1986.

The final 0 Series sets were six-car trains used on JR West Kodama services on the San'yō Shinkansen between Shin-Ōsaka and Hakata, and on the Hakataminami Line until final retirement on 30 November 2008.

Following withdrawal from regular service, JR West ran a number of special commemorative Hikari runs in December 2008. Hikari 347, powered by set R61, arrived at Hakata Station at 6:01 pm on 14 December 2008, end their service after 44 years.

== Set formations ==
=== Original 12-car H/K/N/R/S sets ===
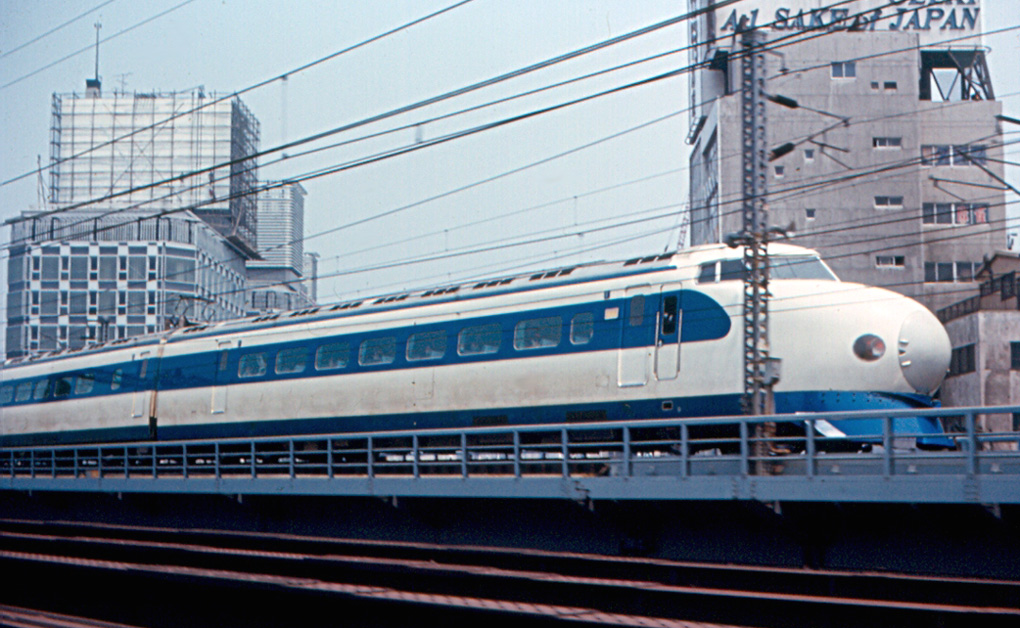
A 0 series set in Tokyo in May 1967

The initial shinkansen fleet delivered for use on Hikari and Kodama services on the Tōkaidō Shinkansen from 1 October 1964 consisted of 30 12-car sets formed of 1st- and 2nd-batch cars. Six sets, H1 to H6, were built by Hitachi between April and August 1964; six sets, K1 to K6, were built by Kisha between July and September 1964; six sets, N1 to N6, were built by Nippon Sharyo between March and September 1964; six sets, R1 to R6, were built by Kawasaki Sharyo between July and September 1964; and six sets, S1 to S6, were built by Kinki Sharyo between April and August 1964. These sets were allocated to Tokyo and Osaka depots.

A further ten 12-car sets (H7/8, K7/8, N7/8, R7/8, S7/8) were delivered between April and July 1965, formed of 120 3rd-batch cars; five 4th-batch sets were delivered between June and July 1966, and five 5th-batch sets were delivered between October and November 1966.

The original 12-car sets were formed as follows, with two first-class cars (type 15 and 16) and two buffet cars (type 35):

Car No.	1	2	3	4	5	6	7	8	9	10	11	12
Designation	Mc	M'	M	M'	MB	M'	MS	M'S	MB	M'	M	M'c
Numbering	21	26	25	26-200	35	26-200	15	16	35	26	25	22

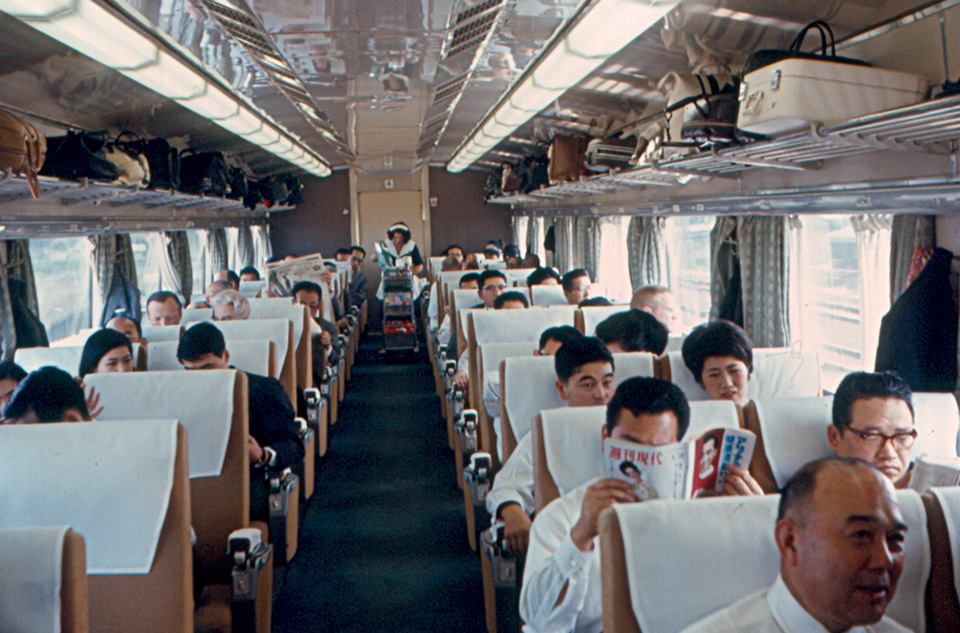
First Class (later named Green Car) interior in May 1967

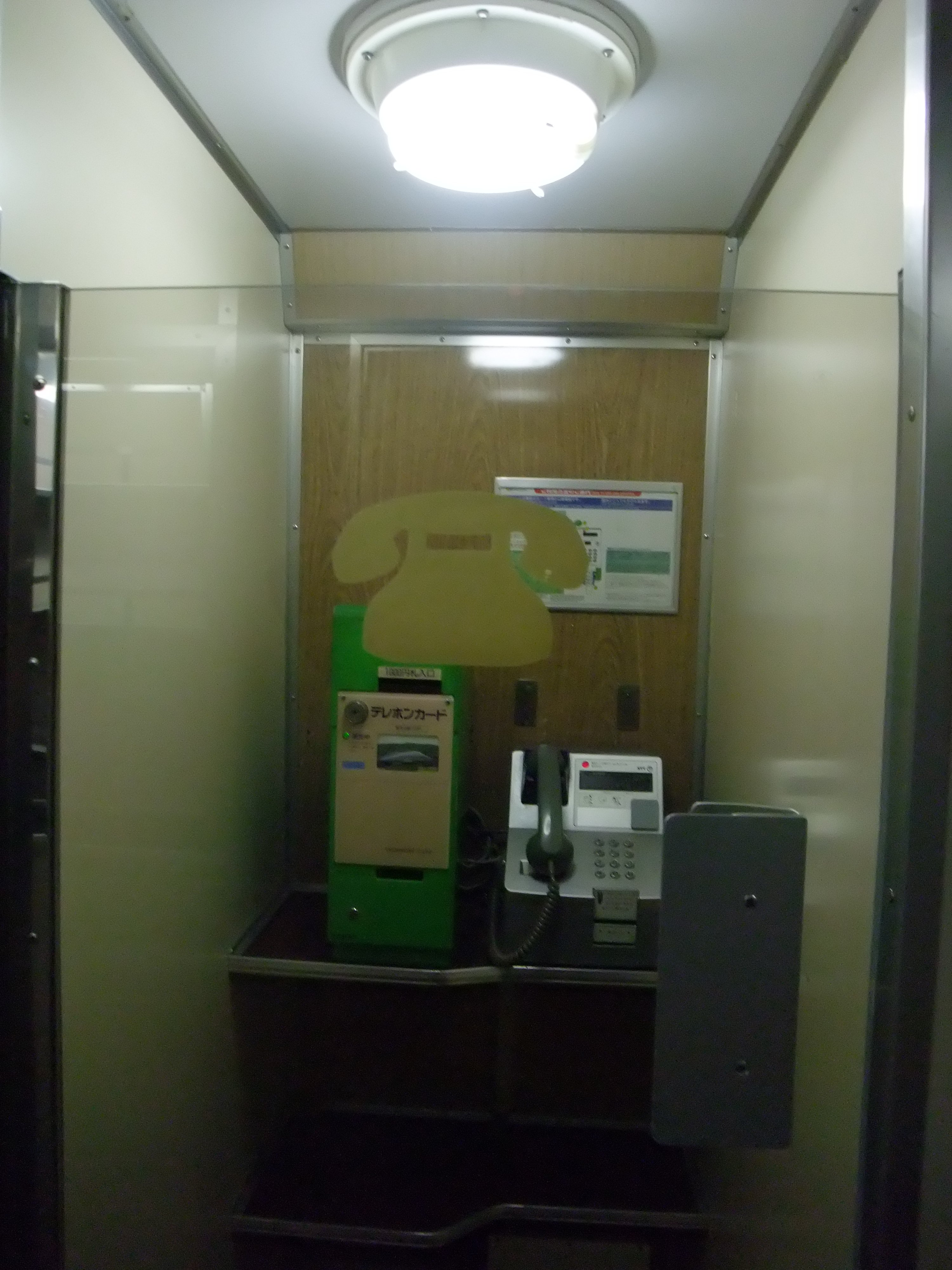
Phone booth on the 0 Series Shinkansen

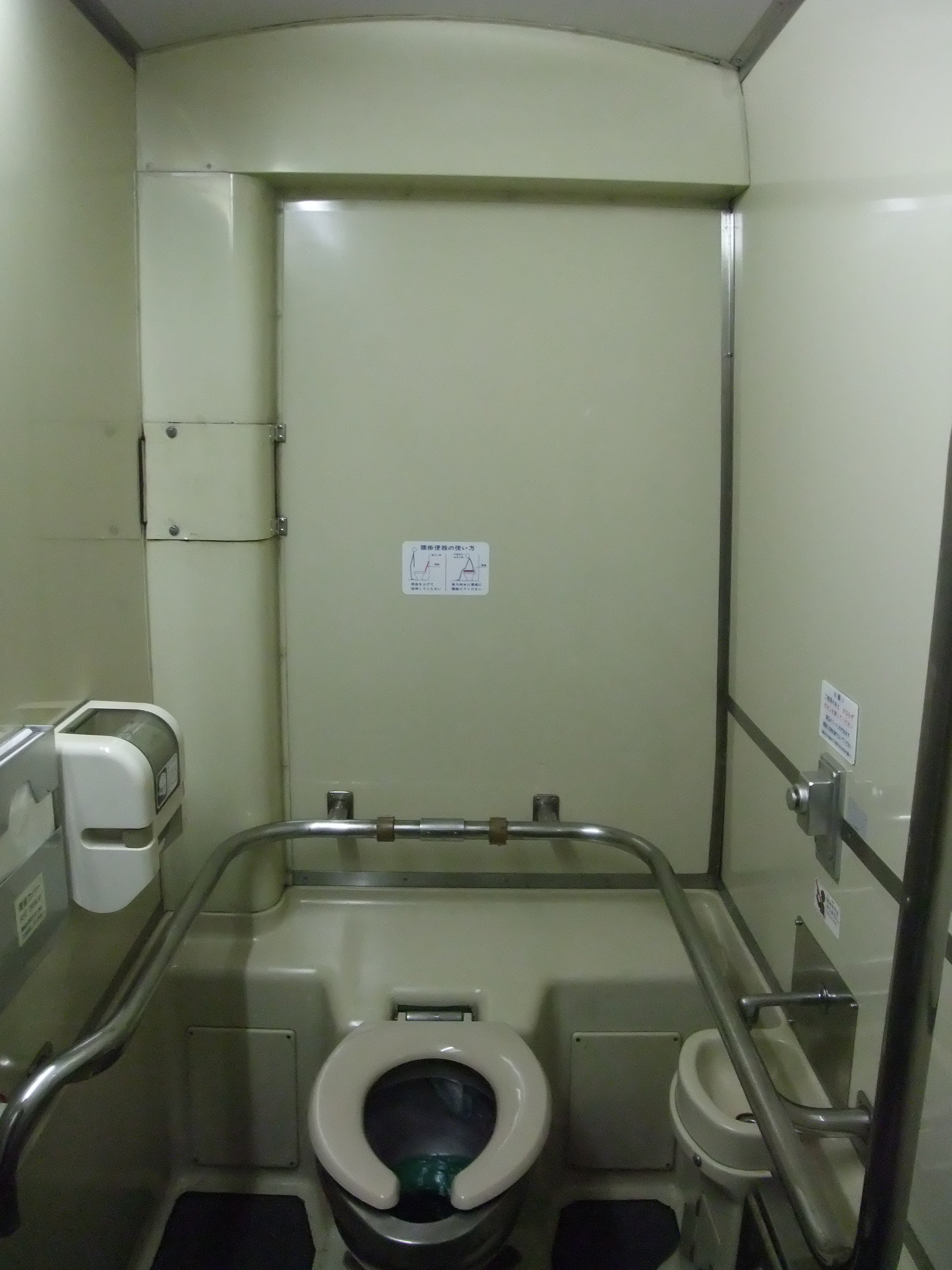
Accessible toilet on the 0 Series Shinkansen

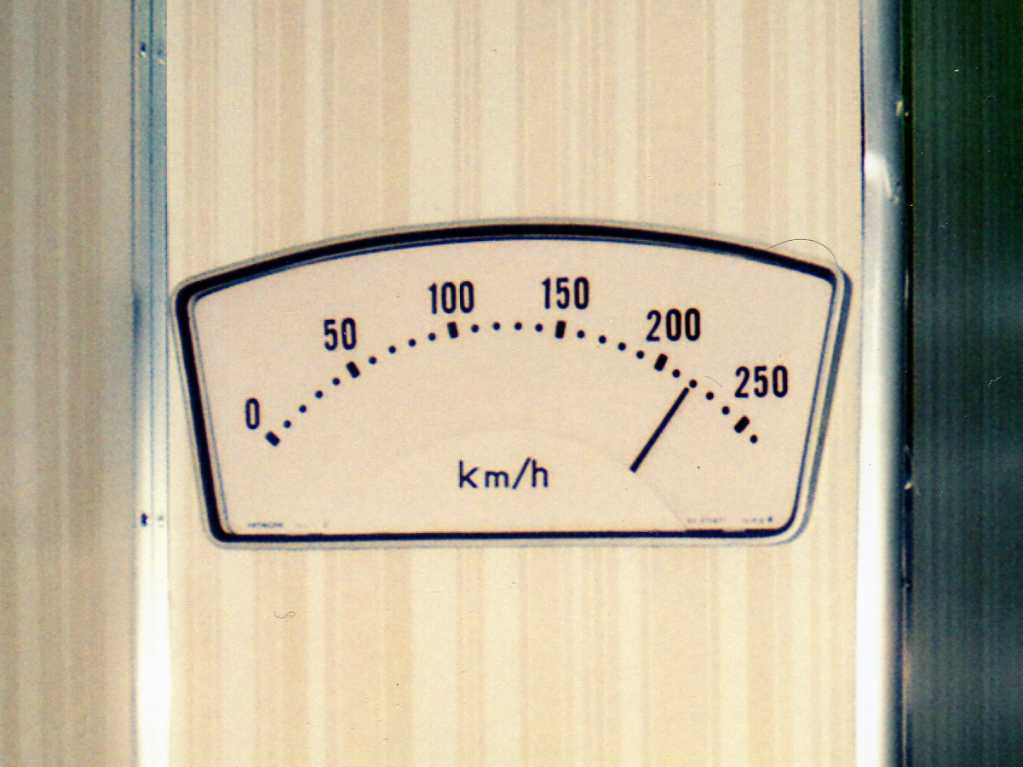
Analog speedometer in the 0 Series Shinkansen in May 1967

=== 12-Car H/K/N/R/S/T Kodama sets ===
A further 21 6th- to 9th-batch 12-car sets were delivered between 1967 and 1969 with only one first-class car (type 16) for use on Kodama services. The "T" sets were built by Tokyu Car Corporation.

These sets were formed as follows:

Car No.	1	2	3	4	5	6	7	8	9	10	11	12
Designation	Mc	M'	M	M'	MB	M'	M	M'S	MB	M'	M	M'c
Numbering	21	26-100	25-100	26-300	35-100	26-300	25-300	16	35-100	26-100	25-100	22

=== 16-Car H/K/N/R/S Hikari sets ===
The original 30 12-car sets were lengthened to 16 cars between December 1969 and February 1970 with the inclusion of new 10th-batch cars for Hikari services to handle the increased number of passengers travelling to and from Expo '70 in Osaka in 1970. From the opening of the San'yō Shinkansen in 1972, these sets were renumbered H1 to H30.

The sets were formed as follows:

Car No.	1	2	3	4	5	6	7	8	9	10	11	12	13	14	15	16
Designation	Mc	M'	M	M'	MB	M'	M	M'	MS	M'S	MB	M'	M	M'	M	M'c
Numbering	21	26	25	26-200	35	26-200	25-700	26-700	15	16	35	26	25-500	26-700	25	22

=== 16-Car K Kodama sets ===
During 1972 and 1973, the earlier 12-car Kodama sets were lengthened to 16 cars with the inclusion of new 13th- and 15th-batch cars, and were renumbered K1 to K47. K sets were disbanded in 1985 when JNR reduced Kodama sets to 12 cars and renamed them S series sets.

The sets were formed as follows:

Car No.	1	2	3	4	5	6	7	8	9	10	11	12	13	14	15	16
Designation	Mc	M'	M	M'	MK	M'	M	M'	M	M'	M	M'S	MB	M'	M	M'c
Numbering	21	26	25	26-300	25-400	26-200	25-200	26-800	25-500	26-800	25-700	16	35	26	25	22

=== 16-Car H Hikari restaurant car sets ===
With the opening of the Sanyo Shinkansen extension to Hakata, the fleet of 16-car H Hikari sets was reformed and increased during 1973 and 1974 with the inclusion of new 16th- and 17th-batch cars, including new restaurant cars (type 36) in addition to the buffet car (type 35). The fleet, as of 10 March 1975, consisted of 64 sets, numbered H1 to H64.

The earlier sets, being composed of the initial Shinkansen vehicles, were withdrawn and scrapped beginning 1976, earlier than expected due to maintenance issues, replaced with new N_{H} sets.

The sets were formed as follows:

Car No.	1	2	3	4	5	6	7	8	9	10	11	12	13	14	15	16
Designation	Mc	M'	M	M'	M	M'	M	M'D	MB	M'	MS	M'S	M	M'	M	M'c
Numbering	21	26	25	26-200	25-700	26-700	27	36	35	26-200	15	16	25-500	26	25	22

=== 16-Car N_{H} Hikari sets ===
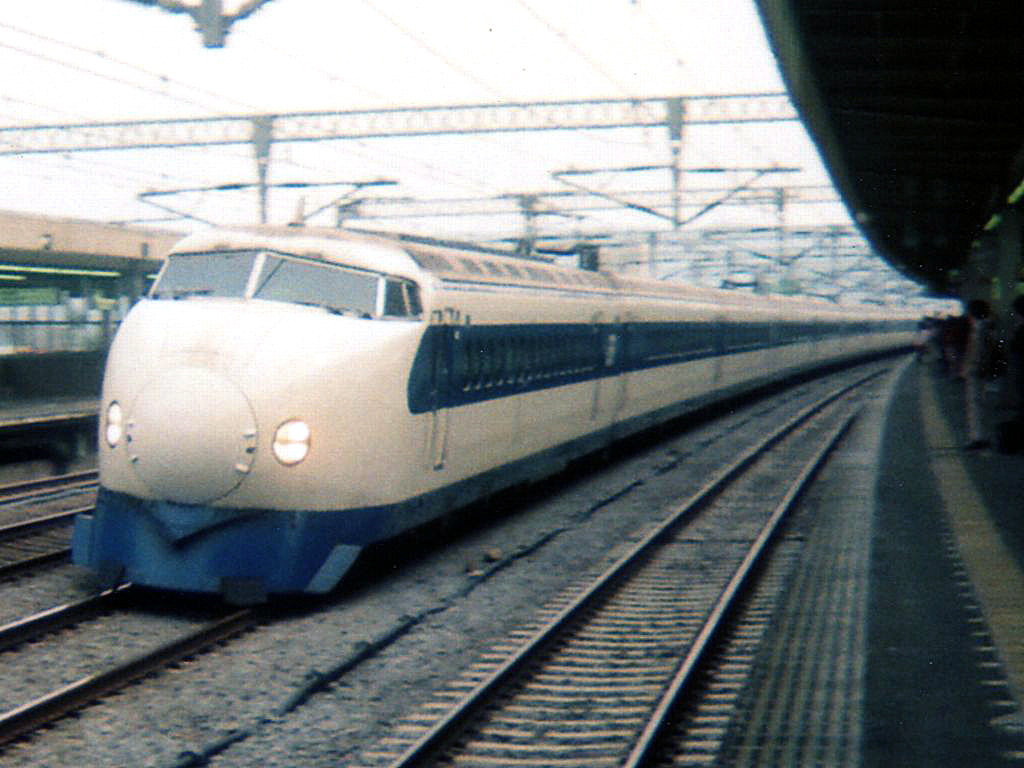
A 16-car N_{H} Hikari set in May 1989

Between 1977 and 1980, 35 new 16-car N_{H} sets were formed of −1000 subseries cars (batches 22 to 29) for Hikari services on the Tōkaidō Shinkansen and San'yō Shinkansen lines. The introduction of 100 series and later 300 series trains reduced the number of 0 series trains used on Hikari services, with 0 series Hikari services operated by JR Central ending in 1995. A small fleet was subsequently maintained by JR West for use on additional holiday period Hikari services, with the last remaining unit, N_{H}32, being disbanded in December 1999.

The N_{H} sets had two Green (first class) cars and a restaurant car in addition to a buffet car, although use of the restaurant cars was discontinued in 1995.

Car No.	1	2	3	4	5	6	7	8	9	10	11	12	13	14	15	16
Numbering	21-1000	26-1000	25-1000	26-1200	25-700	26-700	27	36	35-1000	26-1200	15-1000	16-1000	25-500	26-1000	25-1000	22-1000
Designation	Mc	M'	M	M'	M	M'	MA	M'D	MB	M'	MS	M'S	M	M'	M	M'c

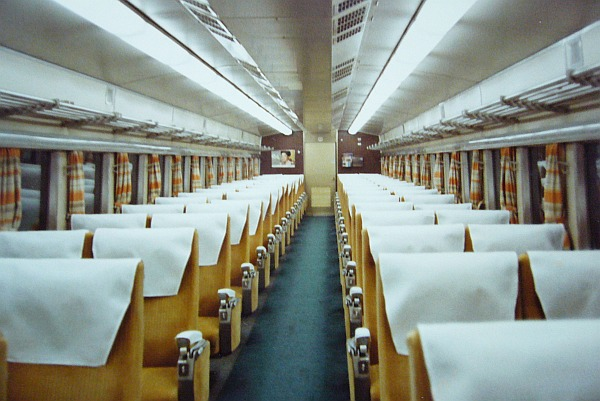
Interior of Green car 15-1019 of set N_{H}15 in 1982

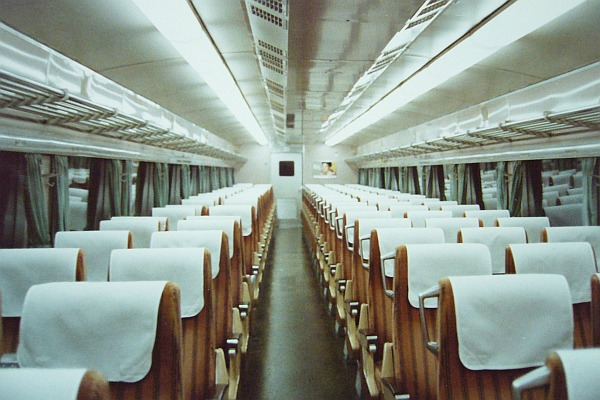
Interior of standard class car 25-526 of set N_{H}15 in 1982

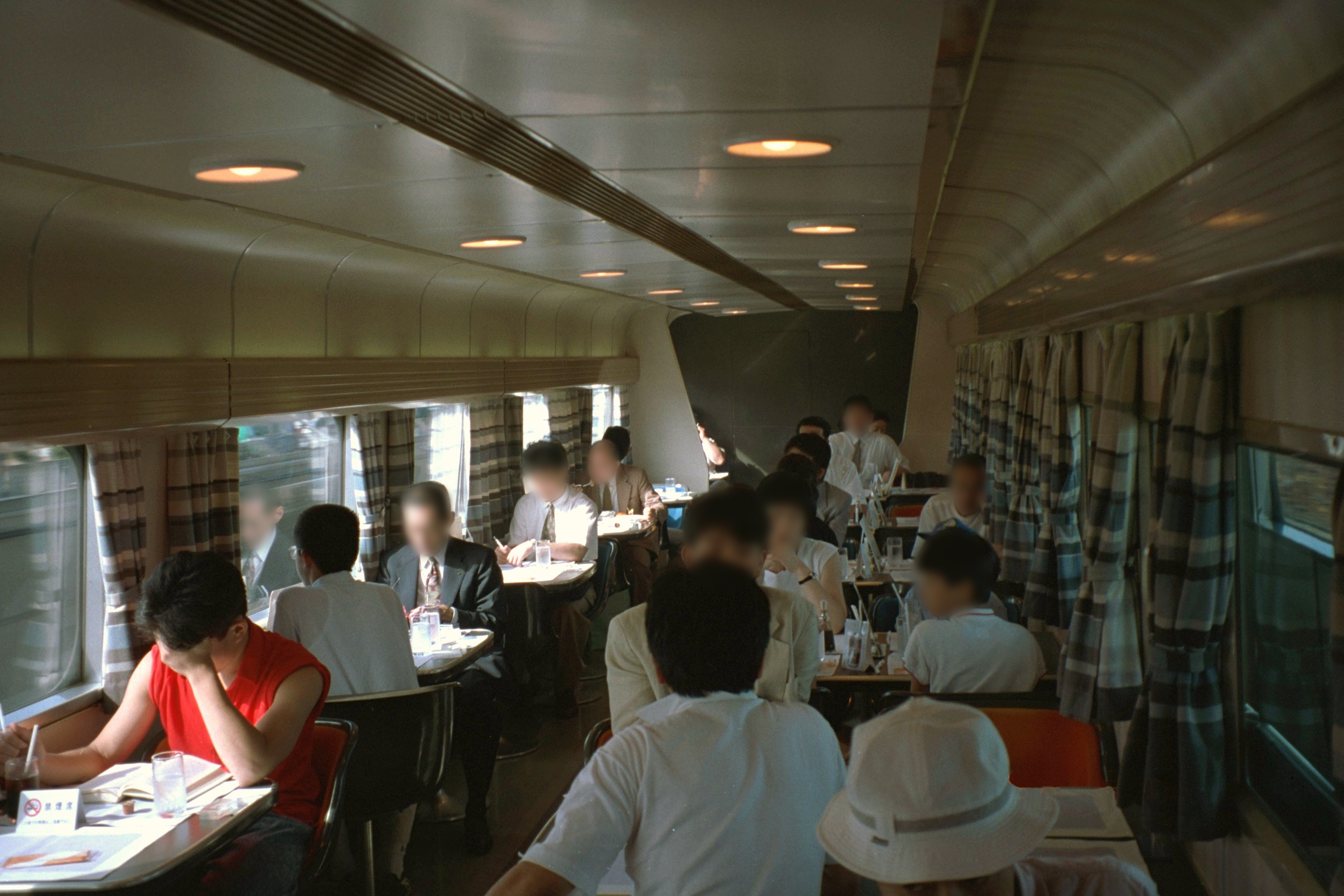
Interior view of an NH set restaurant car in 1992

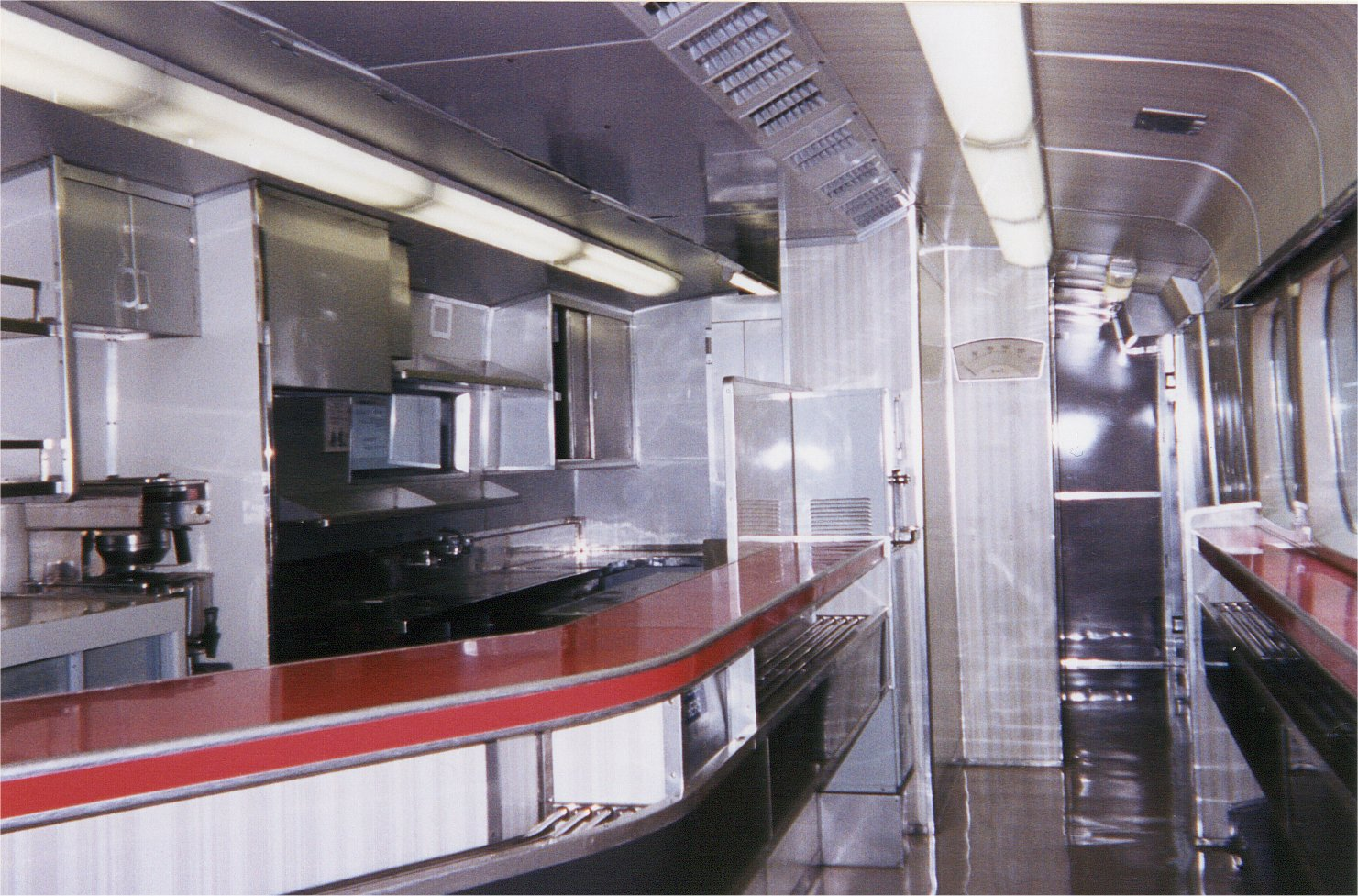
Interior view of a 0 Series buffet car

=== 16-Car y_{K} sets ===
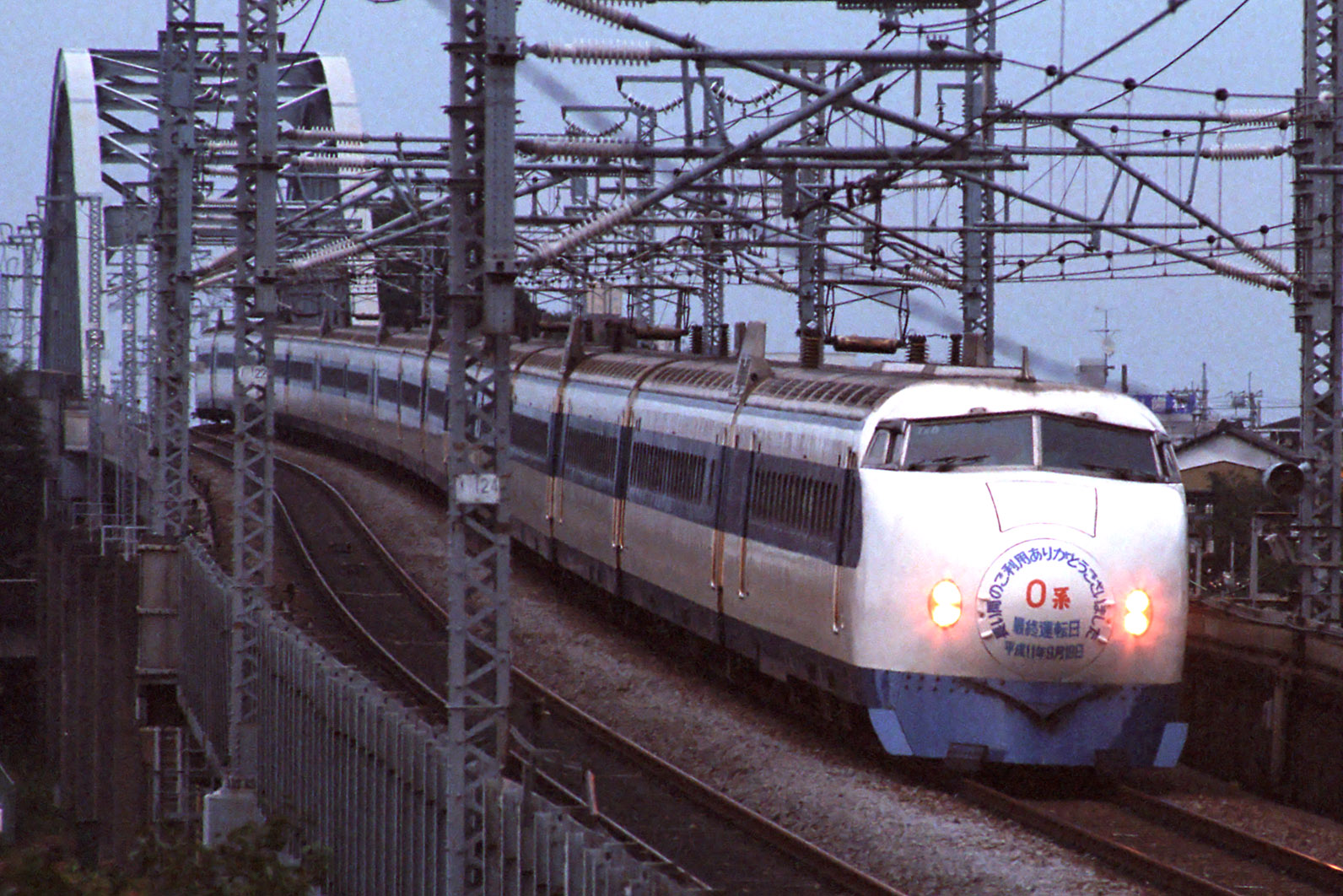
16-car set Y_{K}8 on Tokaido Shinkansen Kodama service with "Arigatō 0 Series" sticker on final day of services, 19 September 1999

The 16-car Y_{K} sets were operated by JR Central on the all-stations Kodama services. These sets had upgraded reserved seat cars with 2+2 seating employing 100 series style seats, but only one Green car per 16-car set. Standard seating was 3+2 in standard class and 2+2 in Green cars.

The fleet was operated by JR Central on the Tokaido Shinkansen until the last units were withdrawn on 18 September 1999. In the last two months of service, they ran with "Arigatō 0 Series" stickers on the front ends.

Car No.	1	2	3	4	5	6	7	8	9	10	11	12	13	14	15	16
Designation	Mc	M'	M	M'	MB	M'	M	M'S	M	M'	M	M'	M	M'	M	M'c
Numbering	21	26	25	26	37	26	25	16	25	26	25	26	25	26	25	22

==== Interior ====
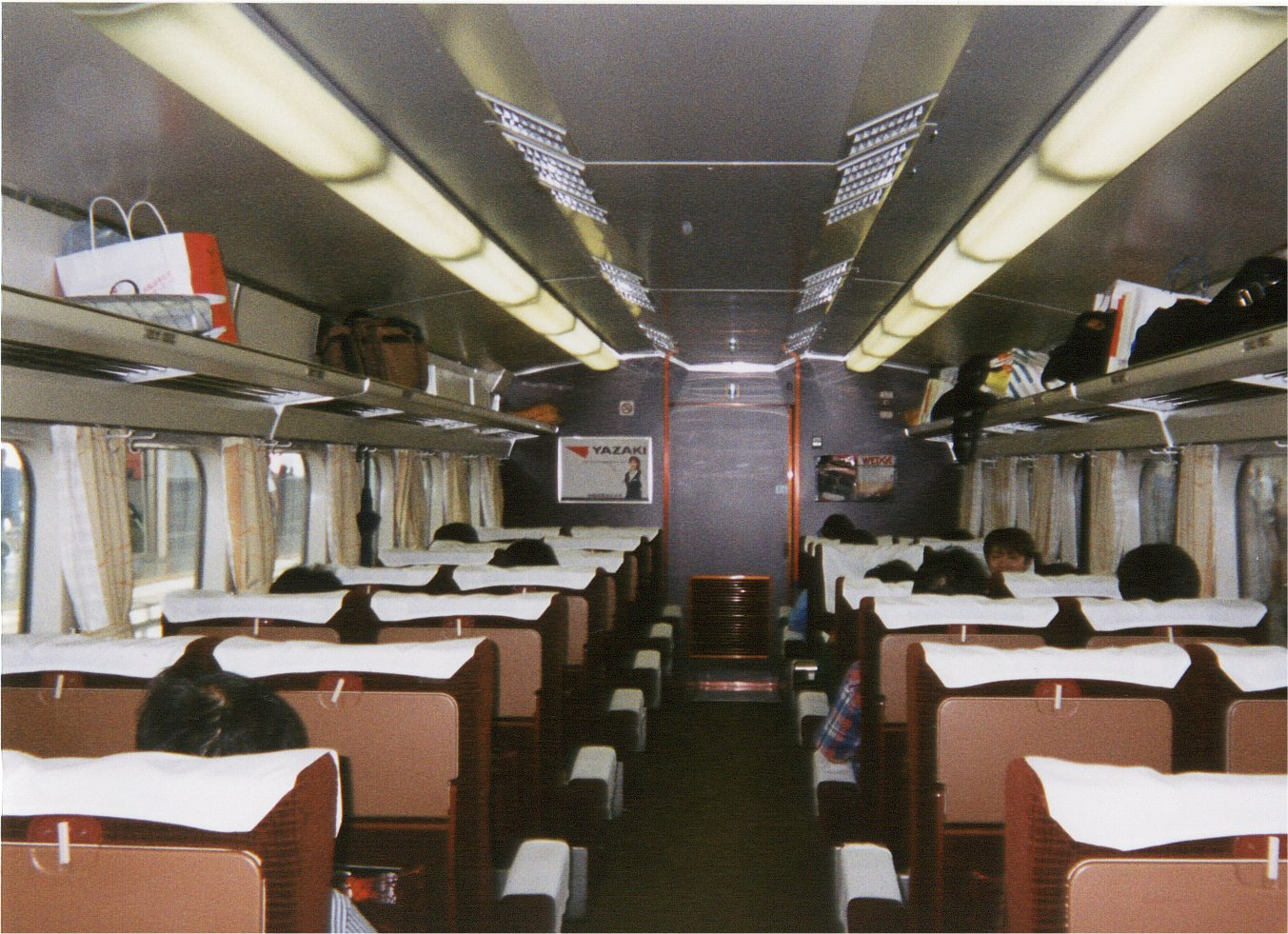
Interior of a Green car on a YK set in September 1999

=== 12-Car S_{K} sets ===
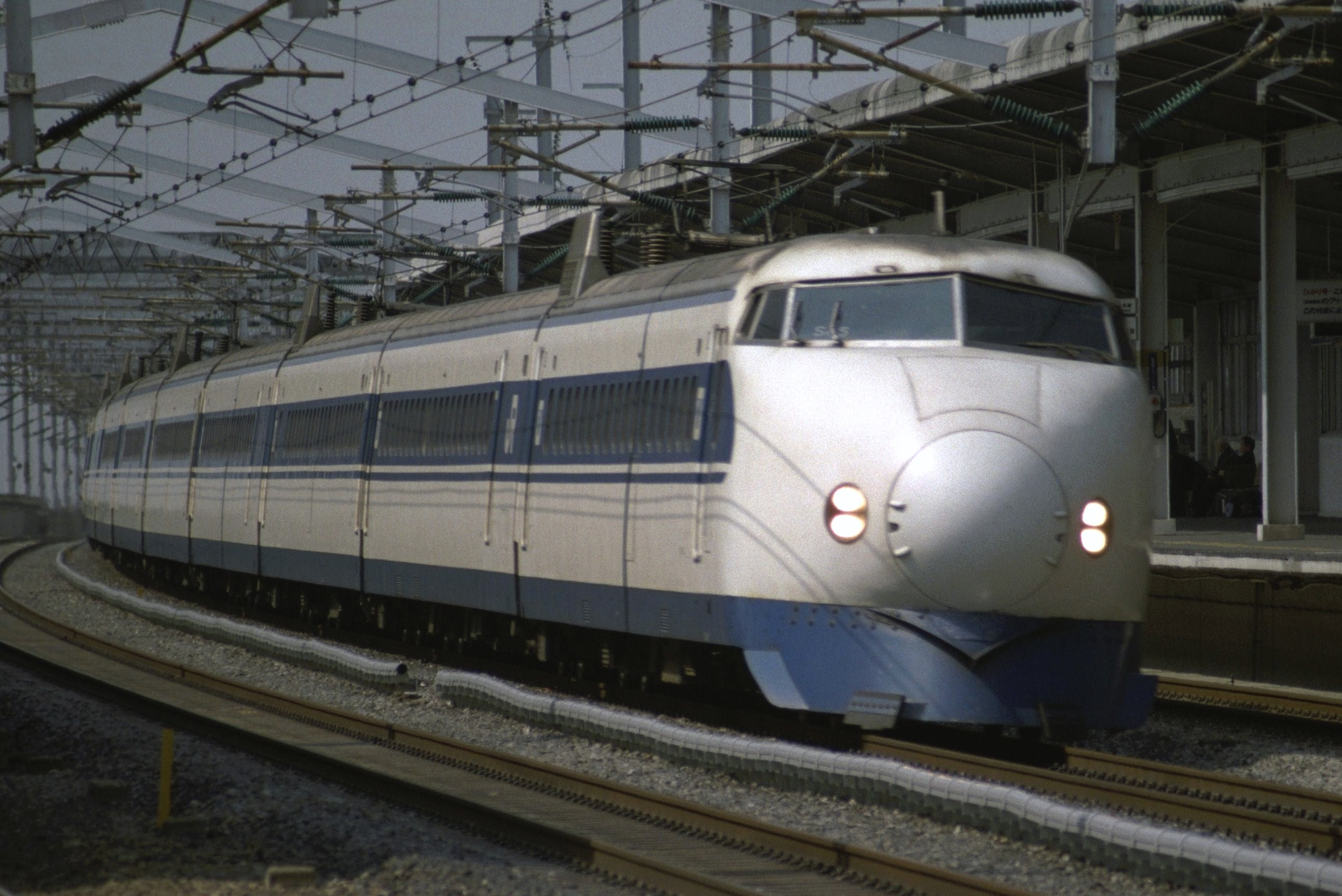
Set SK5 on a West Hikari service in March 1997

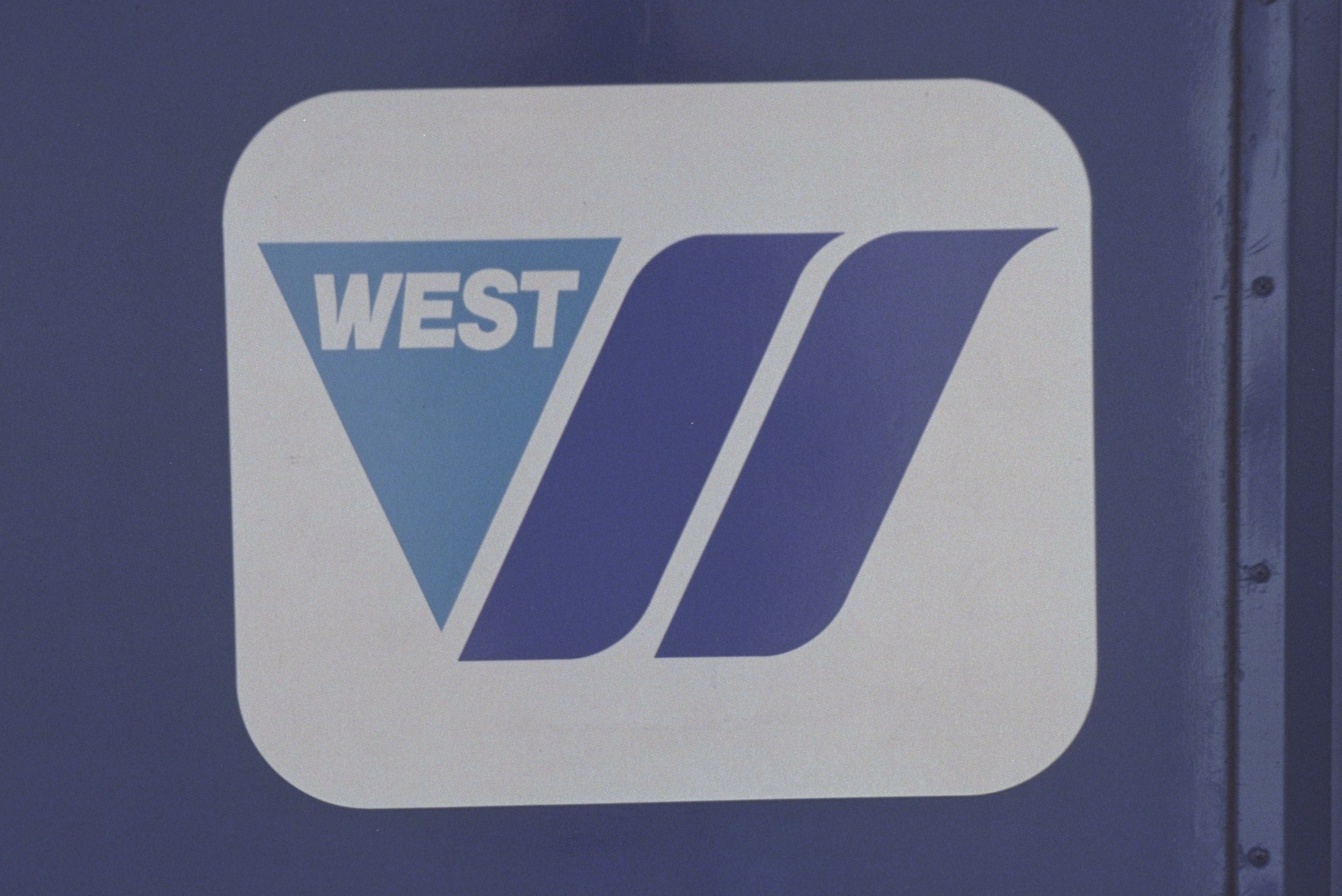
"West" logo on an SK set in March 1997

These 12-car S_{K} sets based at Hakata Depot were operated by JR West on Sanyo Shinkansen West Hikari services between Shin-Osaka and Hakata. Sets were formed of upgraded 5000 and 7000 subseries vehicles with improved seating and buffet cars were refurbished with a special seating area. All standard class cars had upgraded 2+2 seating. The sets were recognisable externally by the addition of an extra thin blue line below the windows (similar to 100 series) and by the large "West" decals near the doors. Some sets originally included specially converted cinema cars, but these were withdrawn in 1996. Following the end of the West Hikari services on 21 April 2000, the remaining S_{K} units were reformed into new 6-car R60 sets to replace unrefurbished sets on Sanyo Shinkansen Kodama services.

One refurbished car was converted into a theater car that showed movies in each set on Sanyo Shinkansen services. Initially, 600 yen was charged, lowering to 500 and then subsequently free. This service was discontinued by 1994, allegedly because passengers frequently forgot to alight from trains.

Car No.	1	2	3	4	5	6	7	8	9	10	11	12
Designation	Mc	M'	M	M'	MB	M'	M	M'S	M	M'	M	M'c
Numbering	21	26	25	26	37	26	25	16	25	26	25	22

=== 4-Car Q sets ===
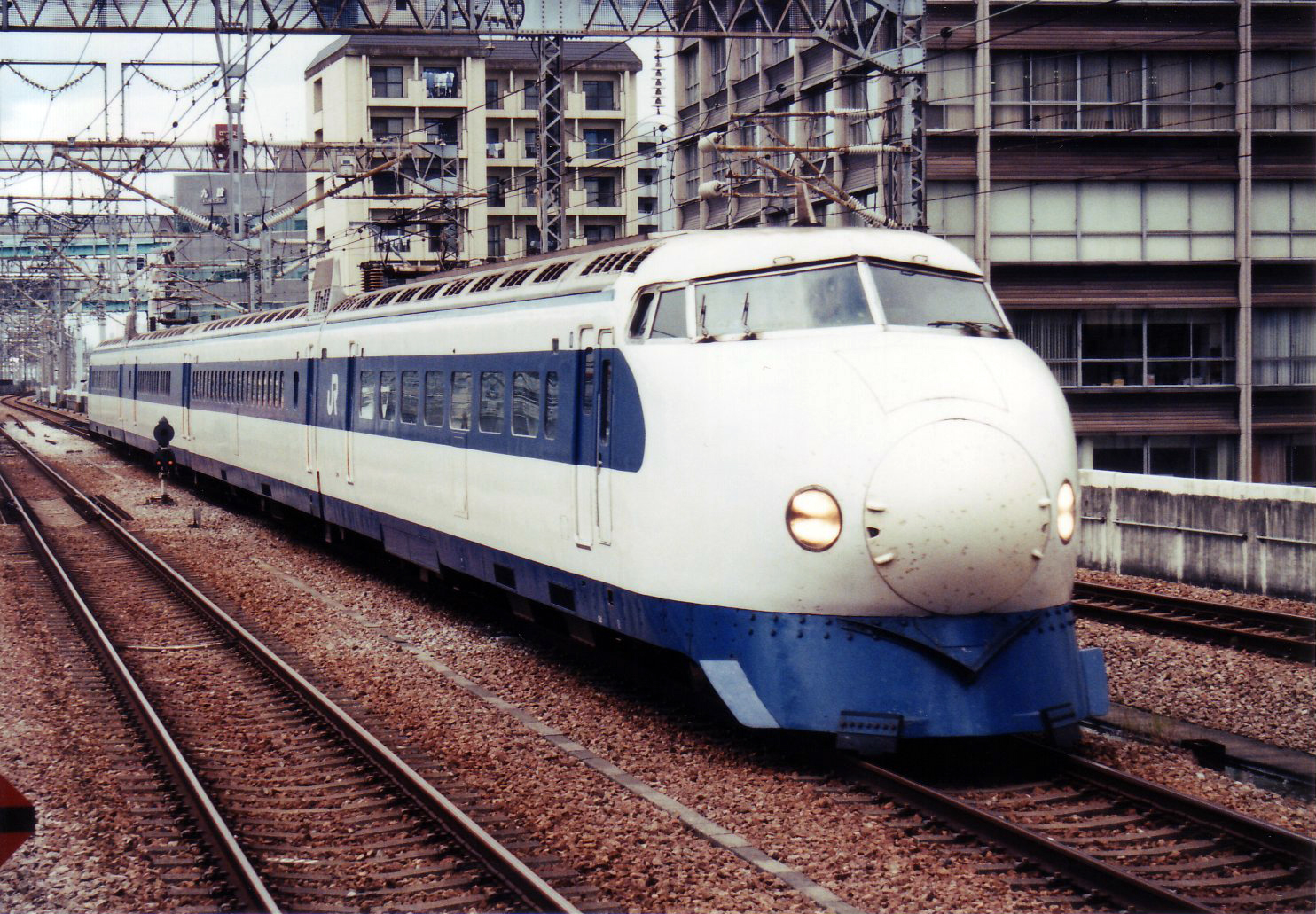
Set Q4 at Hakata on a Sanyo Shinkansen Kodama service in July 1998

4-car Q sets were formed from March 1997 for use on Kodama shuttle services running between Hakata and Kokura/Hiroshima, and on the Hakata-Minami Line. These sets had no Green car and are not newly built; instead, they are reformed from original sets. These sets were quickly reaching the end of useful lives, so the 100 series 4-car P sets replaced them from 2000 onwards. The last remaining unit was withdrawn in September 2001. Set Q3 remained as a static training set at Shin-Shimonoseki Station until 2009, when it was replaced by 100 Series set P2.

Car No.	1	2	3	4
Designation	Mc	M'	M	M'c
Numbering	21	26	25	22

=== 6-Car R sets ===
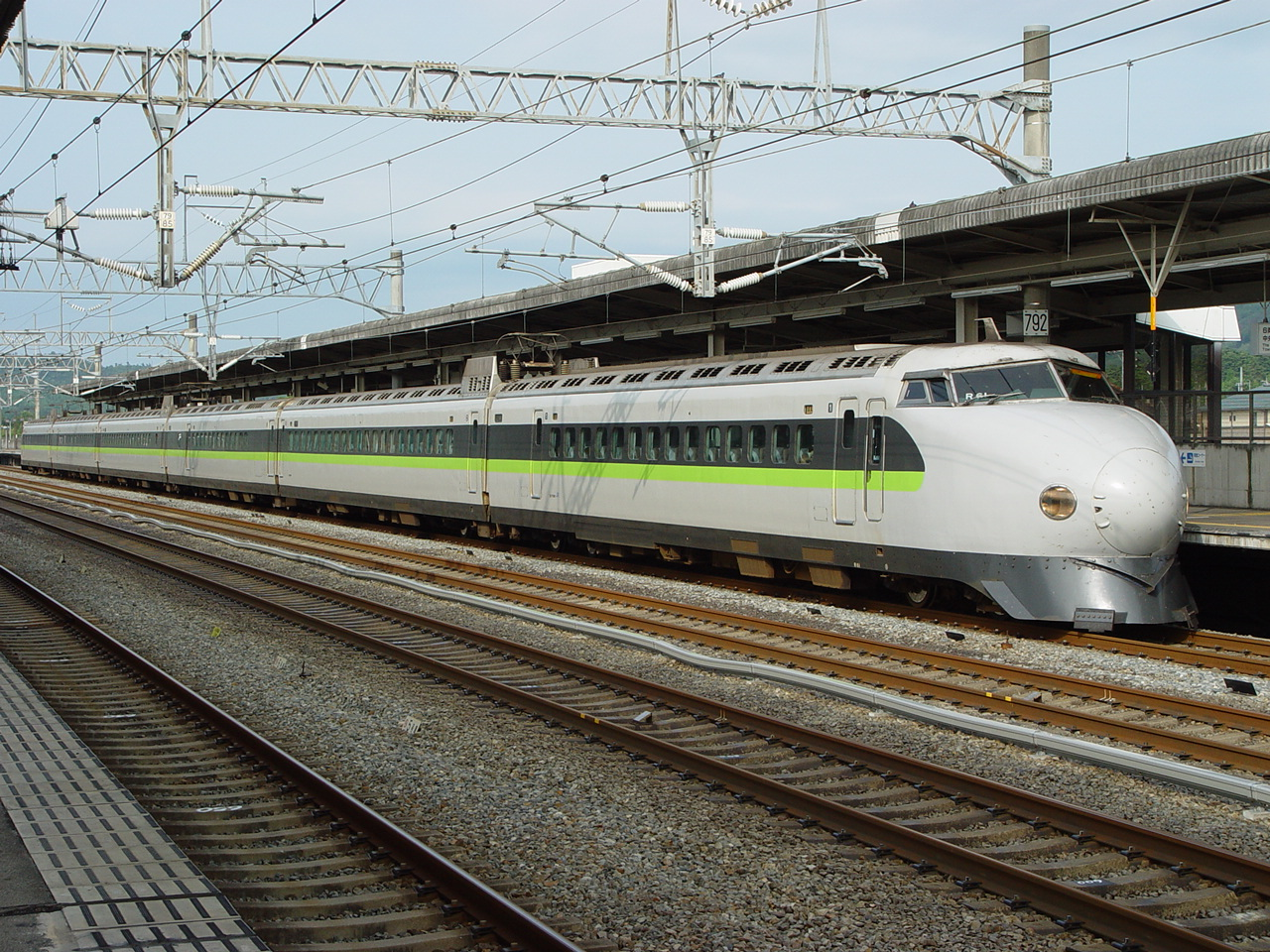
Set R61 in new JR West "Kodama" livery at Higashi-Hiroshima Station on a Sanyo Shinkansen Kodama service in July 2003

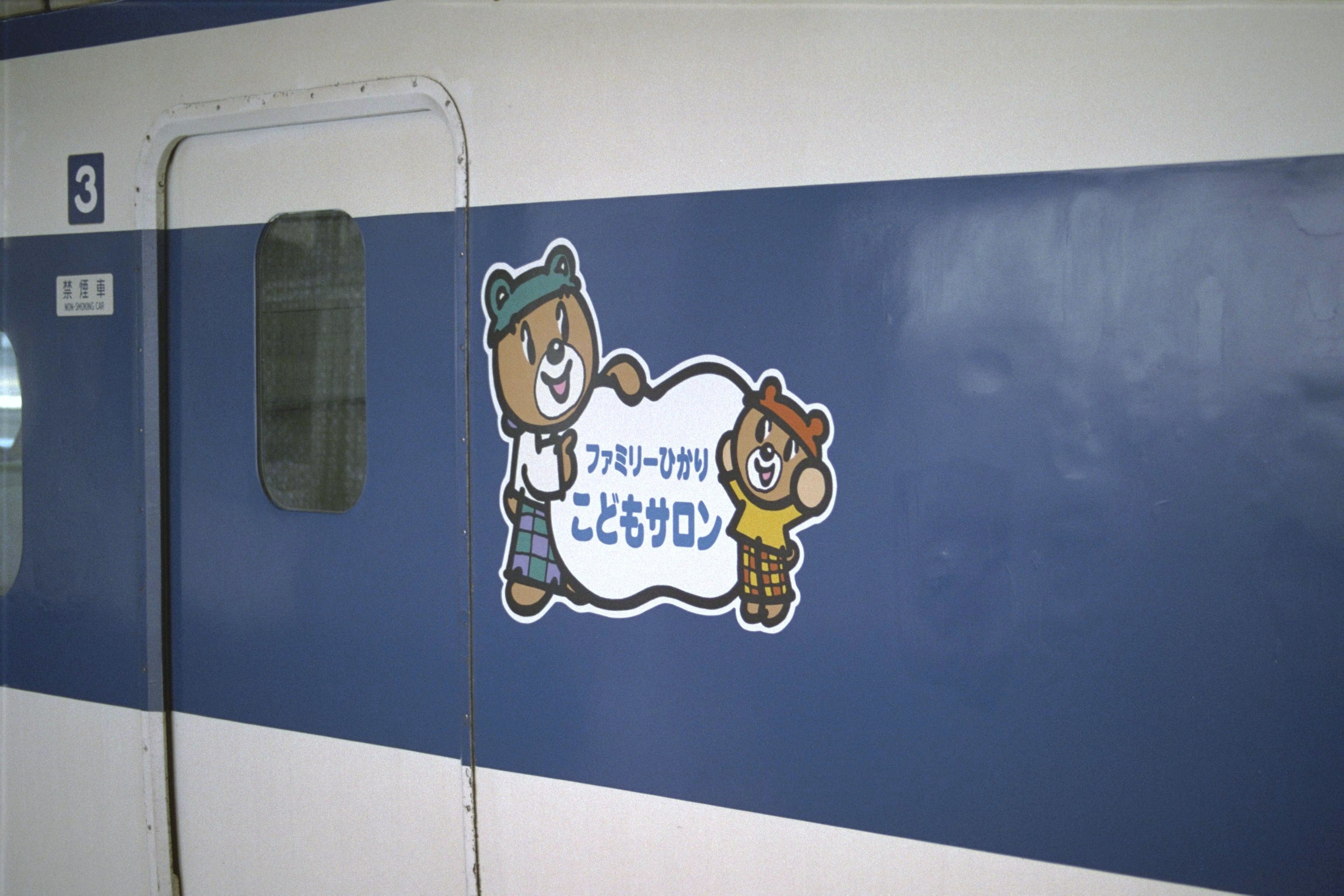
"Children's Saloon" logo in March 1997

The 6-car R units with no Green car were first formed in June 1985 and were used on JR West Kodama services between Shin-Osaka and Hakata. They were also used to operate Kodama shuttle services on the short Hakata-Minami Line from Hakata station.

The no. 3 cars of sets R2 and R24 were rebuilt as "Children's Saloons" with the former buffet counter area converted into a children's soft play area. These sets ran branded as "Family Hikari" during holiday periods. From March 1997 a refurbishment programme was commenced on the R sets, with new internal trim, rotating seats and new toilets/washing facilities. The refurbished units were recognisable externally by an extra thin blue line below the windows (as with West Hikari S_{K} sets) and new "W" decals near the doors.

From April 2000, 6-car "WR" sets were created from former S_{K} unit cars and renumbered in the R60 series. These retained the larger buffet area (disused) and 2+2 seating of the former West Hikari trains, and gradually replaced the remaining unrefurbished R sets. These units initially retained their "West Hikari" branding, but were gradually repainted into the new JR West "Kodama" livery from May 2002. Initially scheduled to be withdrawn in 2006, the last three remaining sets (R61/R67/R68) remained in service until 30 November 2008. By June 2008, they had been repainted into their original ivory and blue livery with silver roofs.

Since the R sets were only six cars long, there were cases where the emergency coupler in the leading car was used in commercial operation. Set R51 (first generation) of the "West Hikari" was not converted to 12 cars, but was instead left as a six-car train, and was only operated once a day. During peak times, in order to increase capacity, the leading car 22-3901 (16-133 converted to a leading car) on the Tokyo side was coupled to set R23 on the Hakata side, which had a strengthened coupler (the leading car 21-7001 on the Hakata side of set R51 was also modified in the same way). When operated as a 12-car train, set R23 had unreserved seats and set R51 had reserved seats. The organization chart in the large timetables of the time indicated that "6-car Kodama-type trains may be coupled on some days."

Car No.	1	2	3	4	5	6
Designation	Mc	M'	MB	M'	M	M'c
Numbering	21	26	37	26	25	22

==== Interior ====
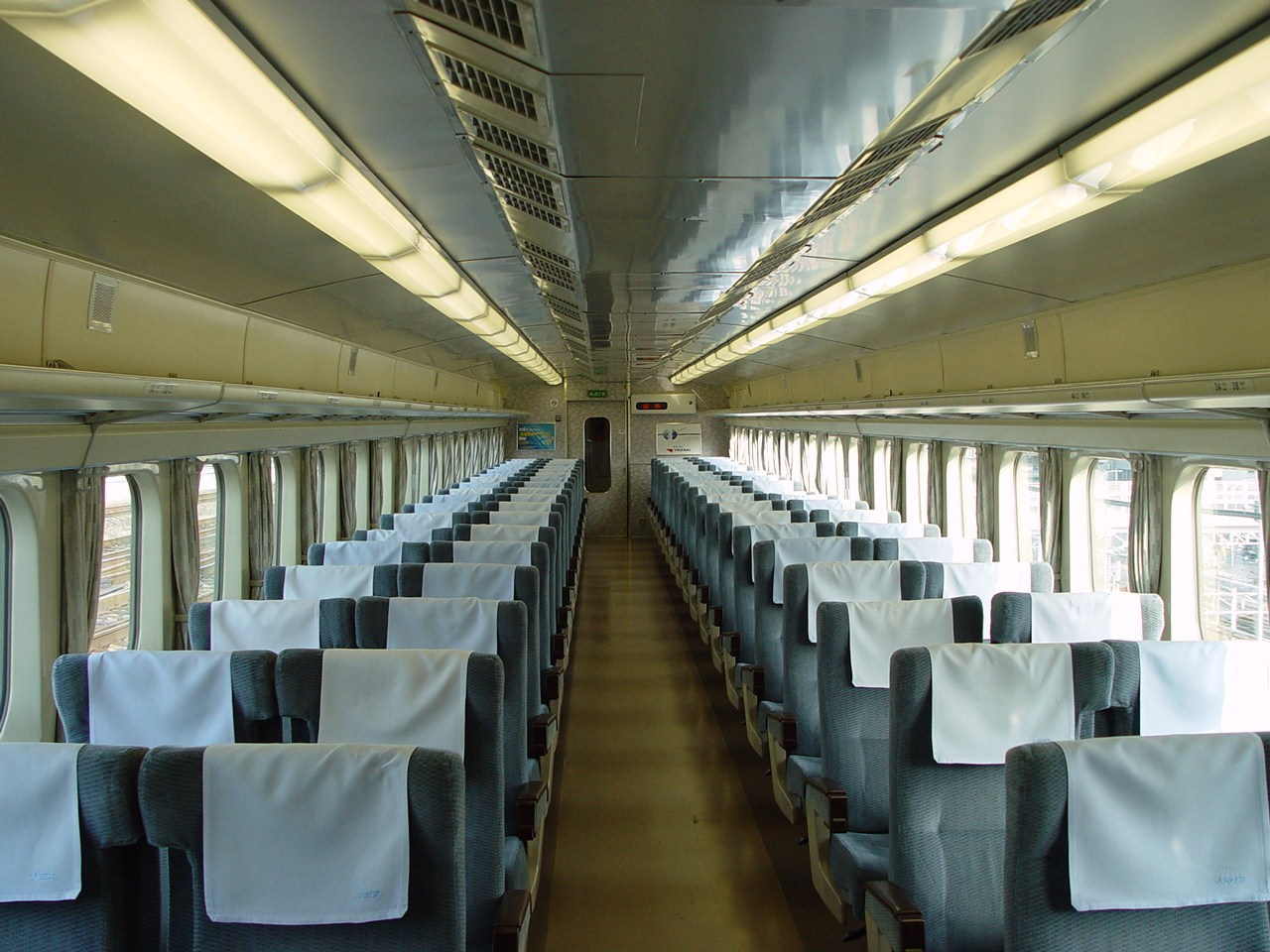
2+2 seating in set R61 in July 2003

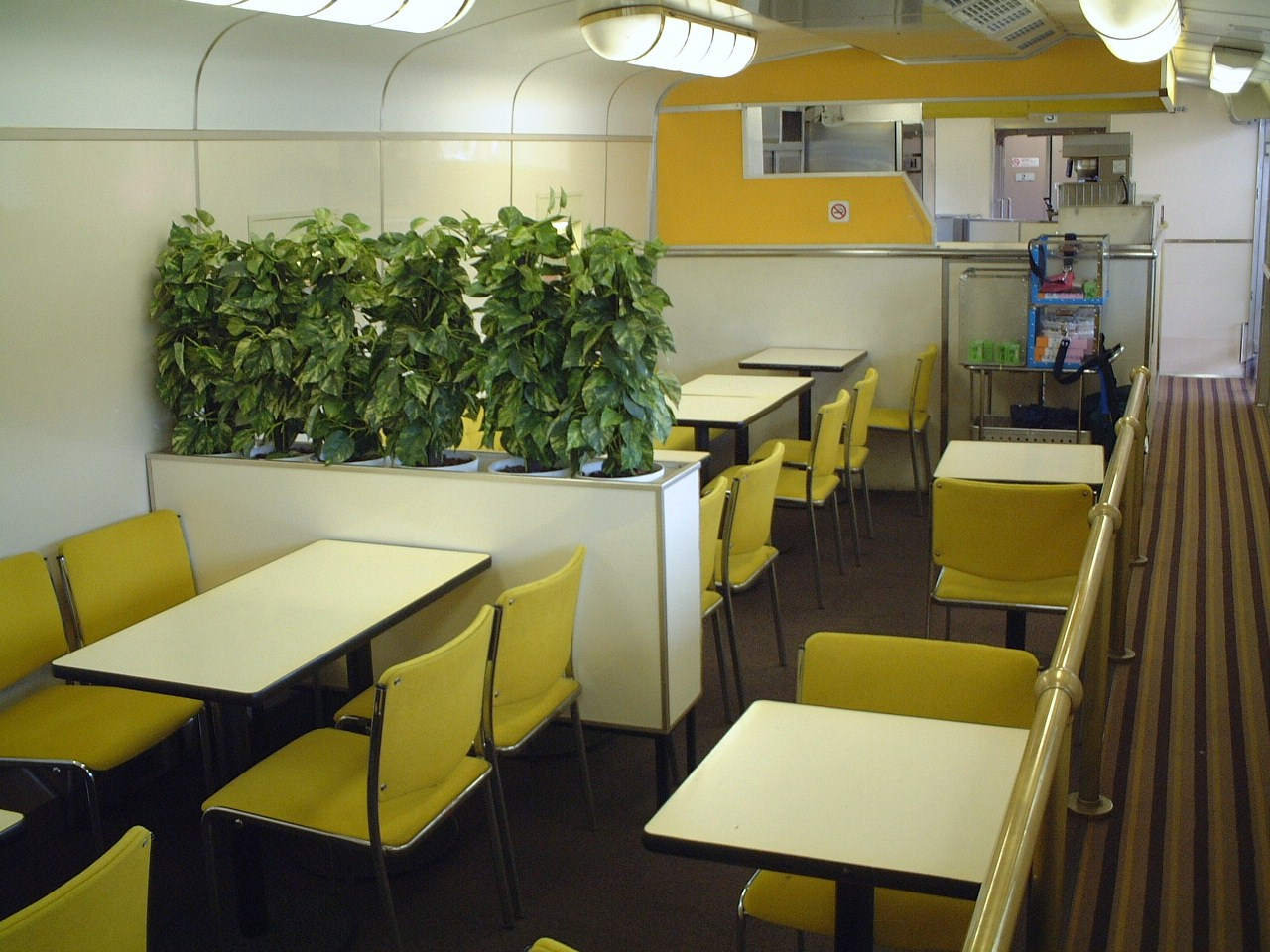
Interior of former buffet car 37-7302 in set R62 used as a general lounge area in May 2002

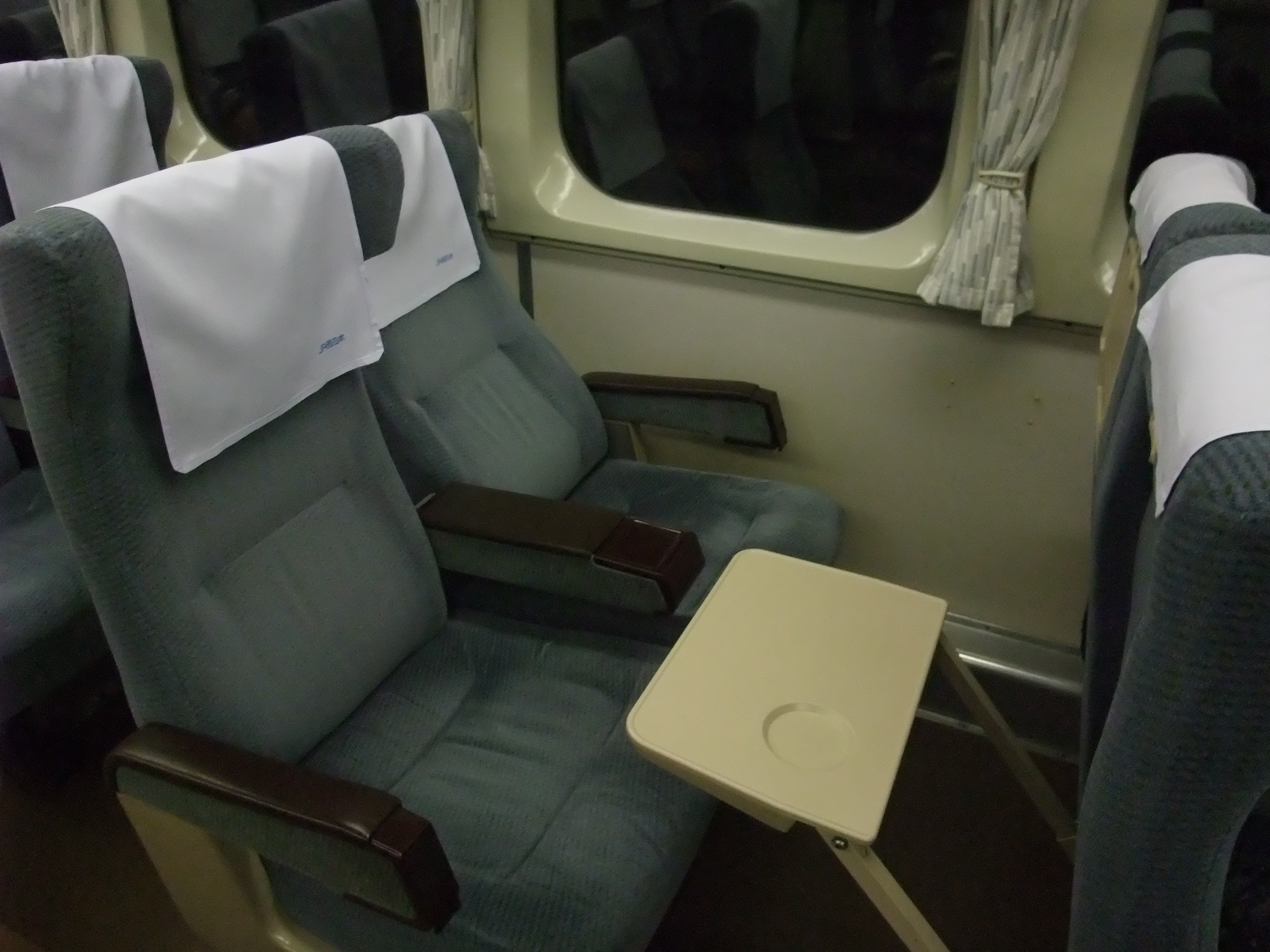
Closeup of a 0 Series seat in 2008

== Preserved examples ==
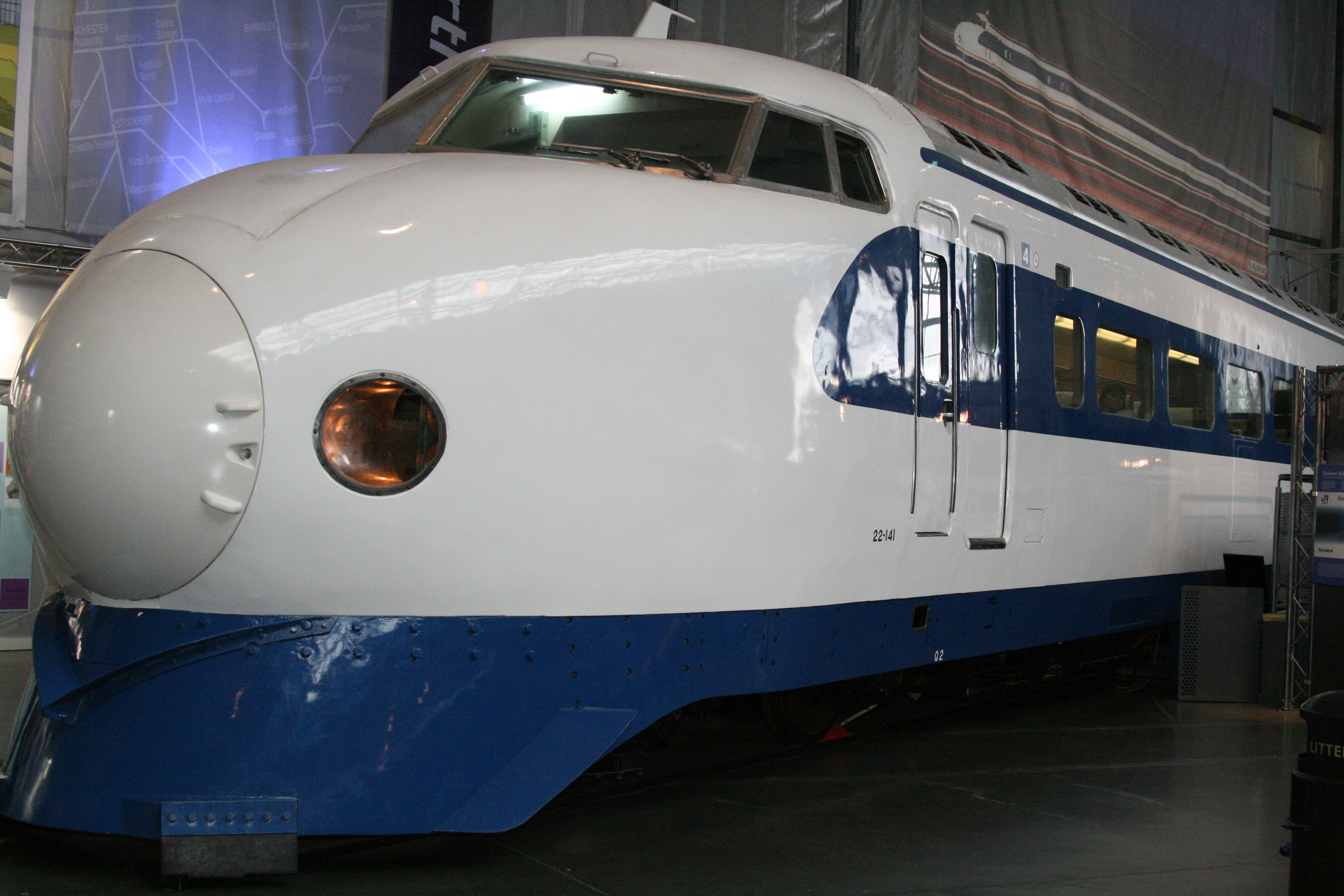
An 0 Series head car on display at the National Railway Museum, in York, England

Owing to its extensive usage and long service life, 25 vehicles have been preserved:

- The leading vehicle from car 4 of set R1 is preserved at Tainan HSR station in Tainan, Taiwan. It was formerly used as a structure gauging car from 2004, during construction of the Taiwan High Speed Rail, and was formally donated to Taiwan in 2012. Restoration work was completed from 2018 to 2019, before the car was put on display on 22 December 2023.
- The leading vehicle from car 4 of set Q2 is preserved at the National Railway Museum, in York, England. It was donated by JR West in 2001, and was the first Shinkansen unit (of any series) to be preserved at a museum outside Japan.
- 23 former vehicles are preserved or stored in museums and various other locations around Japan.

Vehicle number	Date built	Date withdrawn	Location	Remarks
16-1	March 1964	March 1977	Preserved at the Kyoto Railway Museum, which opened in April 2016. (Formerly displayed at the Modern Transportation Museum in Osaka.)	Cars from pre-production "C" set H1.
21-1	March 1964	March 1977	Preserved at the Kyoto Railway Museum, which opened in April 2016. (Formerly displayed at the Modern Transportation Museum in Osaka.)	Cars from pre-production "C" set H1.
22-1	March 1964	March 1977	Preserved at the Kyoto Railway Museum, which opened in April 2016. (Formerly displayed at the Modern Transportation Museum in Osaka.)	Cars from pre-production "C" set H1.
35-1	August 1964	March 1977	Preserved at the Kyoto Railway Museum, which opened in April 2016. (Formerly displayed at the Modern Transportation Museum in Osaka.)	Cars from first production set H2.
21-2	July 1964	March 1977	The Railway Museum, Saitama	From original set H2. Moved from Osaka in August 2008. Exhibited from October 2009.
22-2	July 1964	March 1977	JR West Staff Training Centre, Suita, Osaka	From original set H2.
21-25	April 1964	March 1978	The Railway Museum, Saitama	Cab section only. Originally displayed outside Tokyo Transport Museum.
21-59	March 1968	February 1982	Shintorimachi Park, Fuji, Shizuoka	
21-73	July 1969	October 1984	Shinkansen Park, Settsu, Osaka	
22-75	August 1969	March 1985	Ome Railway Park, Ome, Tokyo	Repainted for short period into Tohoku ivory/green livery in late 1980s.
22-77	September 1969	March 1990	Satsuki Kindergarten, Fukuoka	Used as a staff room and library.
36-84	1975		SCMaglev and Railway Park, Nagoya	
21-86	December 1971	November 1991	SCMaglev and Railway Park, Nagoya	
21-100	September 1973	October 1991	Akishima City Library, Akishima, Tokyo	Used as library reading room.
21-141	June 1976	October 2000	The Railway History Park in Saijo, Ehime Prefecture	Former set H94, later R52. Front half only.
22-141	June 1976	October 2000	National Railway Museum, York, England	A gift from JR West that was presented to the NRM in 2001
22-1003	November 1976	November 1994	Namikawa Railway Heritage Park, Kameoka, Kyoto	Cab section only.
21-2023	January 1985	June 1998	J-TREC factory, Yokohama	Cab section only. Preserved at Sakuma Rail Park until November 2009. Moved to Tokyu Car from July 2010.
22-2029	March 1986	September 1999	Nippon Sharyo Factory, Toyokawa, Aichi	
16-2034	1986		SCMaglev and Railway Park, Nagoya	
37-2523	1983		SCMaglev and Railway Park, Nagoya	
21-5035 (formerly 21-1032)	June 1978	10 March 2004	Tainan HSR station, Tainan, Taiwan	Cab from former set R1. Used as structure gauging car during the construction of the Taiwan High Speed Rail until 2008. On display at Tainan HSR station from June 2021.
22-7007	–	December 2008	Suita Yard, Osaka Prefecture	Cab from former set R68. On display inside Suita City Kento Library since 11 November 2020.
21-7008 (formerly 21-2026)	1983	December 2008	Kawasaki Heavy Industries factory, Hyogo Prefecture	Car of last operational set, R61
21-7038	–	–	Kawasaki Good Times World, within Kobe Maritime Museum	West Hikari livery. Front third section.

== See also ==
- List of high-speed trains
