= Hakataminami Line =

Extension of the Sanyō Shinkansen in Fukuoka Prefecture, Japan

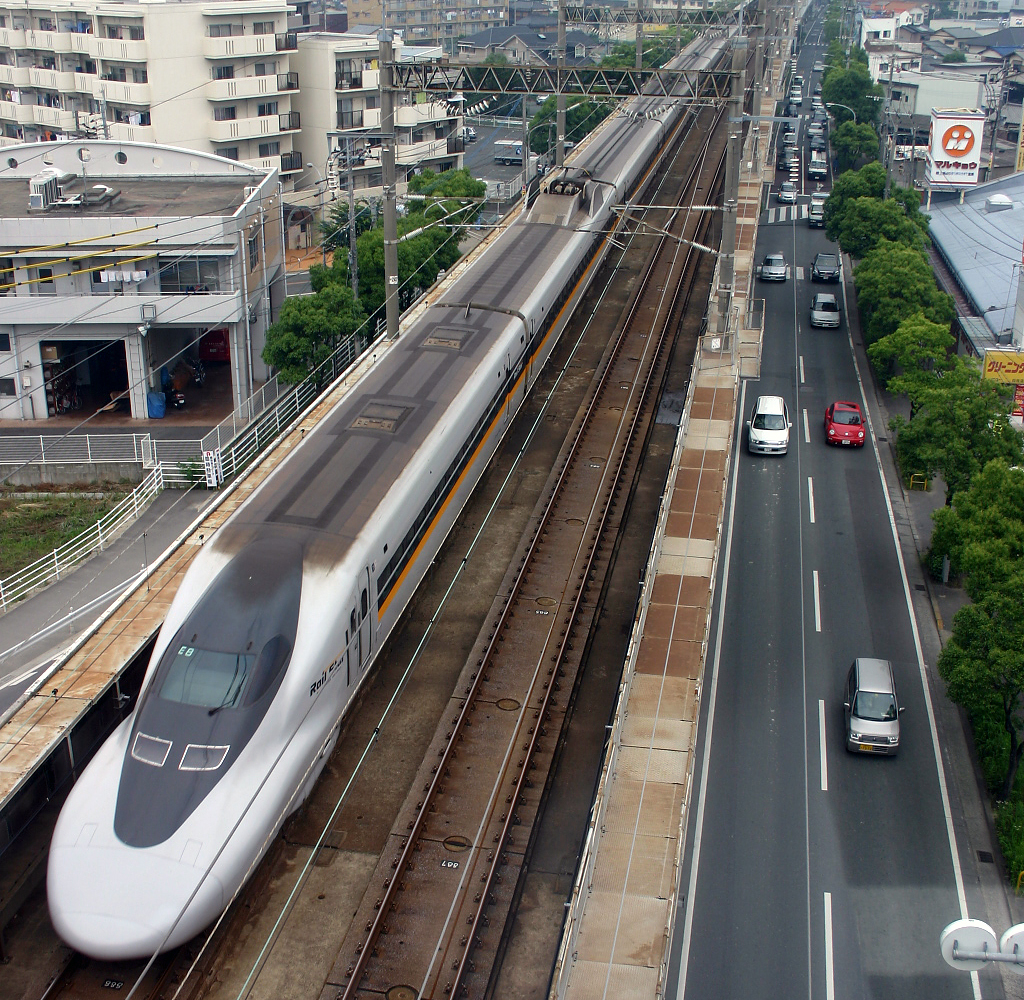
- 700 series train on the Hakataminami Line, June 2004

Overview
- Native name: 博多南線
- Owner: JR West
- Locale: Fukuoka City
- Termini: Hakata; Hakataminami
- Stations: 2
- Color on map: Blue

Service
- Type: Heavy rail
- System: Shinkansen
- Services: Kodama shuttle
- Operator: JR West
- Depot: Hakata
- Rolling stock: 500, 700 and N700 series

History
- Opened: 1 April 1990; 36 years ago

Technical
- Line length: 8.5 km (5.3 mi)
- Number of tracks: 2
- Track gauge: 1,435 mm (4 ft 8 1/2 in) standard gauge
- Electrification: Overhead line, 25 kV 60 Hz AC
- Operating speed: 120 km/h (75 mph)
- Signalling: Cab signalling
- Train protection system: ATC-NS

The Hakataminami Line (Japanese: 博多南線, Hepburn: Hakataminami-sen) is an 8.5-kilometre (5.3 mi) railway line in Fukuoka Prefecture, Japan, connecting Hakata Station in Fukuoka with Hakataminami Station in Kasuga. It is operated by the West Japan Railway Company (JR West).

The line was originally built by Japanese National Railways (JNR) to shuttle San'yō Shinkansen trains from the Hakata terminal to the Hakata Shinkansen Depot in Kasuga for storage and maintenance. At the time, Kasuga was a rural area, and JNR did not consider a station necessary. By the late 1980s, the area had developed into a suburb of Fukuoka, and JR West constructed Hakataminami Station adjacent to the depot. Service began on 1 April 1990.

Although the line both uses Shinkansen rolling stock and has some overlap with the Kyushu Shinkansen, it is not officially designated as a Shinkansen or mini-Shinkansen line. Most services are Kodama trains entering or leaving service on the San'yō Shinkansen.

== Rolling stock ==
Current

- 500-7000 series 8-car sets
- 700-7000 series 8-car Hikari Rail Star sets
- N700-7000/8000 series 8-car sets
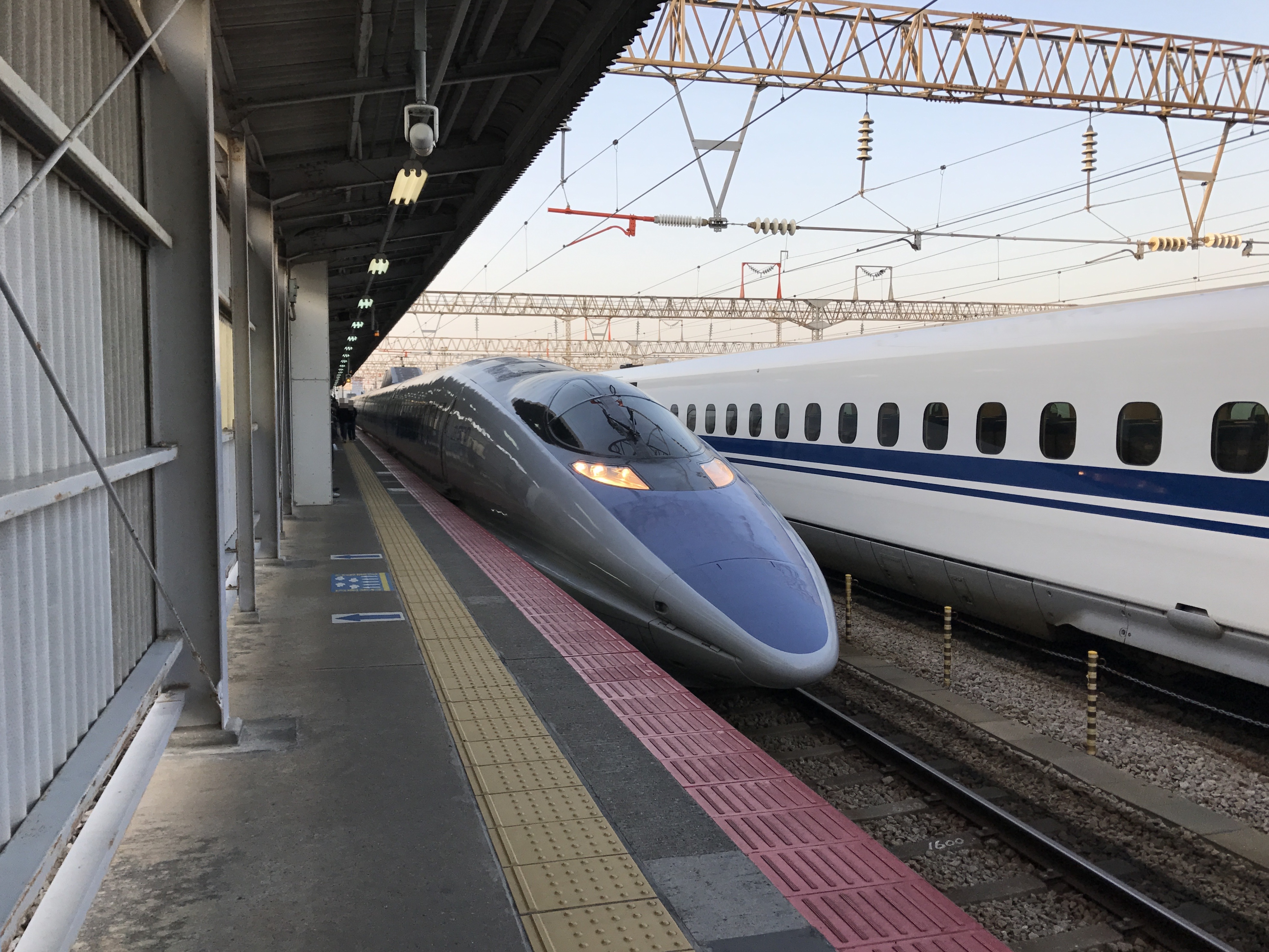
A 500 series set at Hakataminami Station

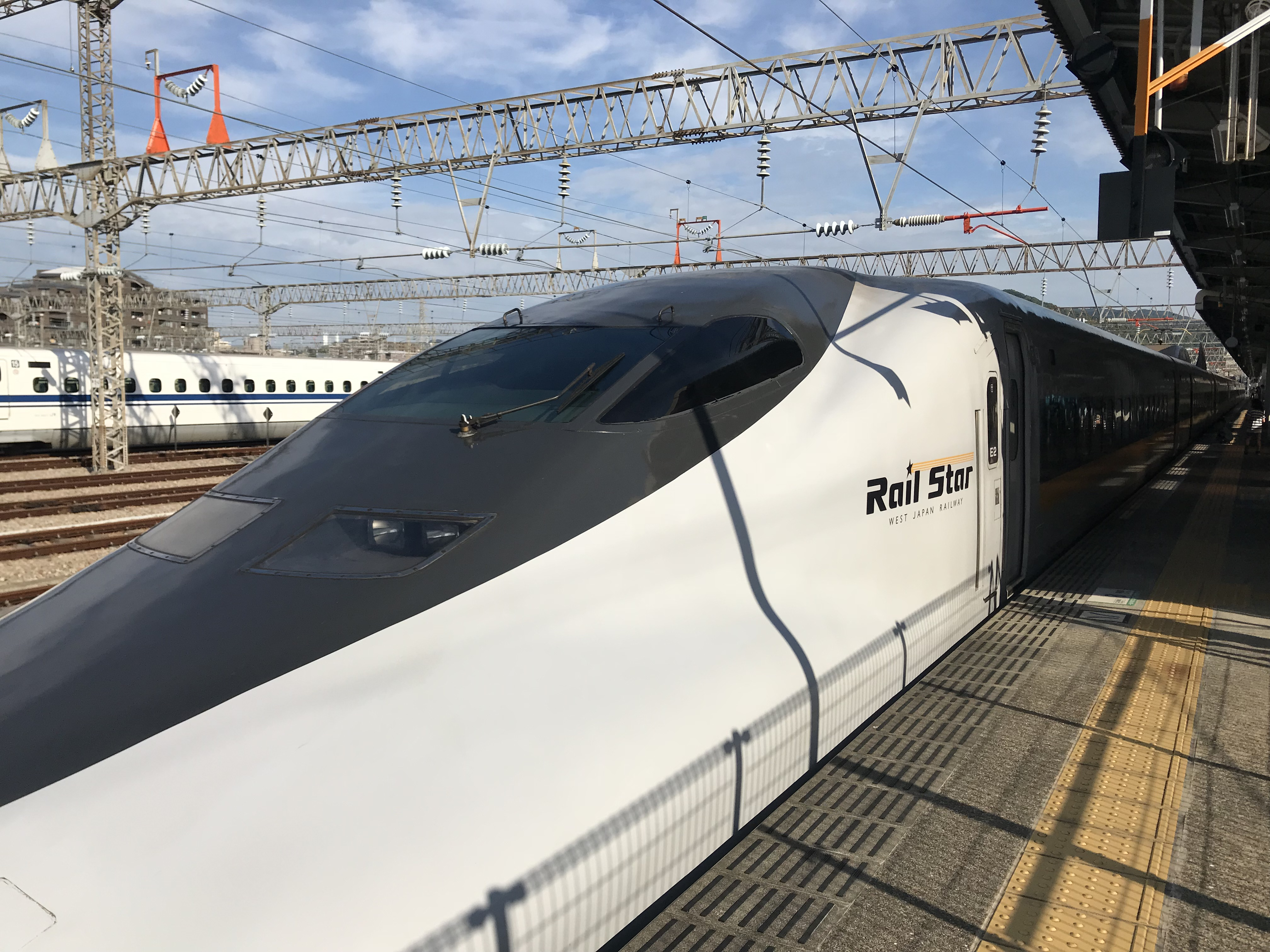
A 700-7000 series Hikari Rail Star set at Hakataminami Station

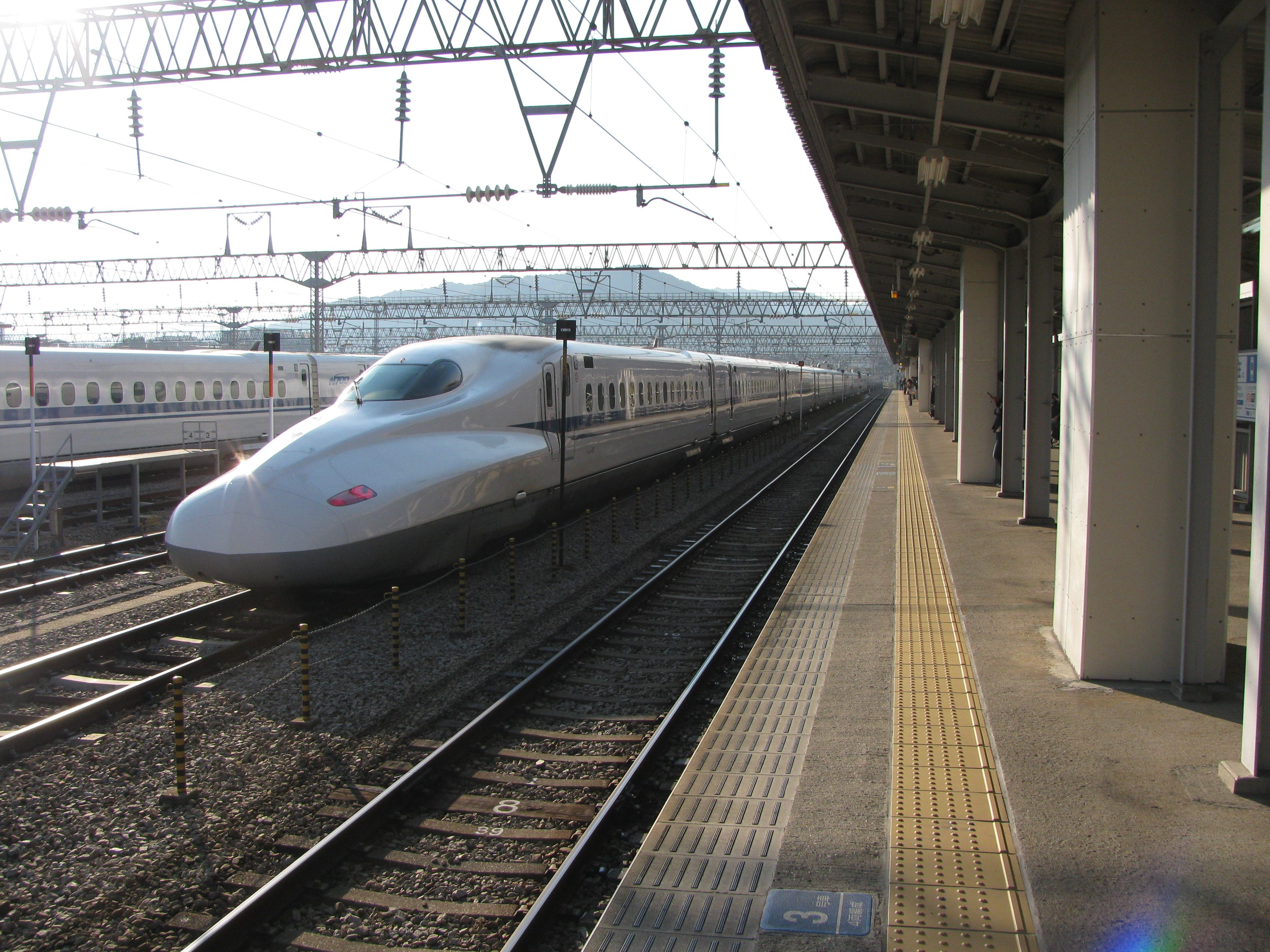
A N700-7000 series set at Hakataminami Station

Former

- 0 series 4/6-car sets
- 100 series 4/6-car sets
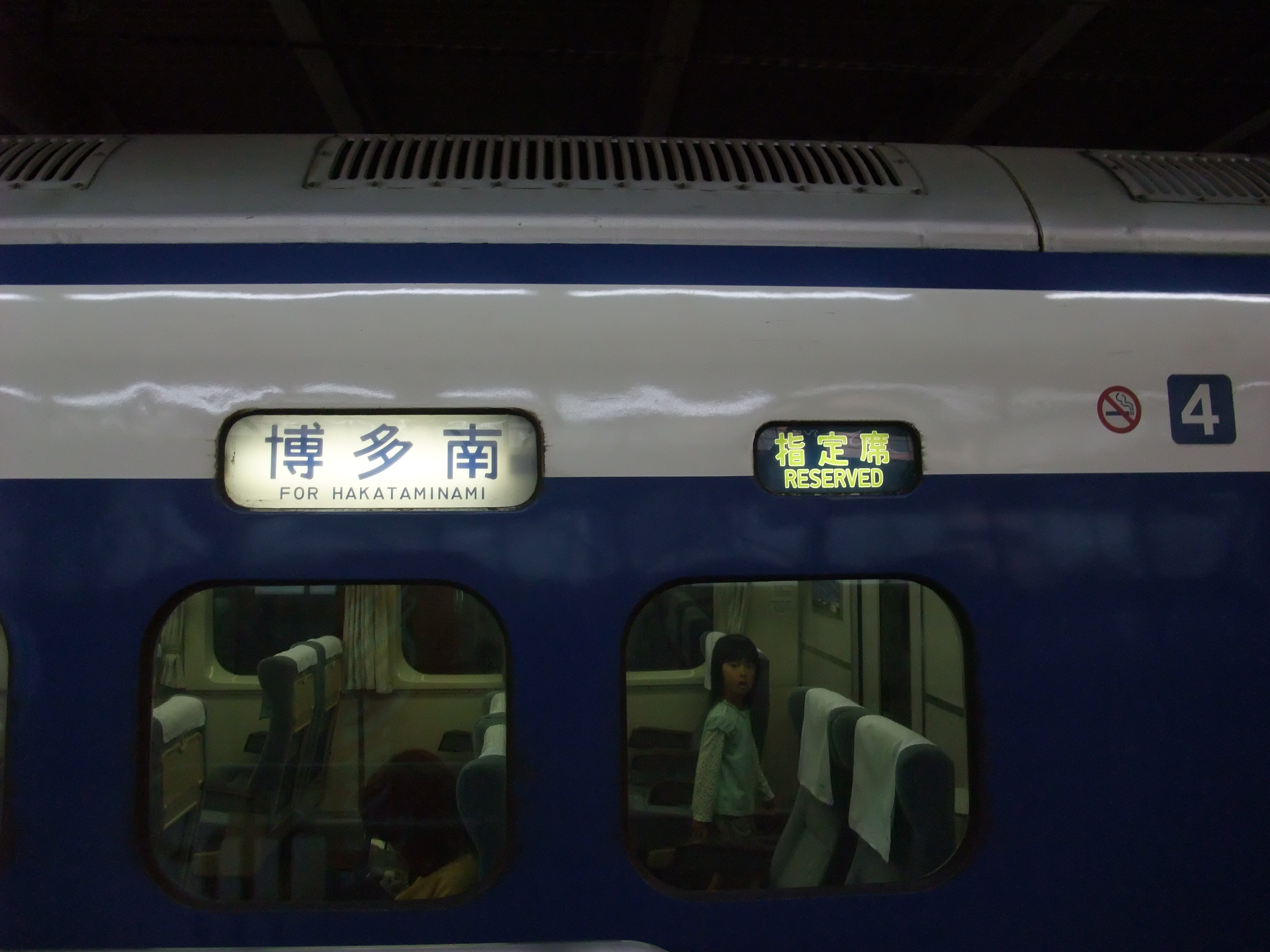
Side view of a 0 series set bound for Hakataminami

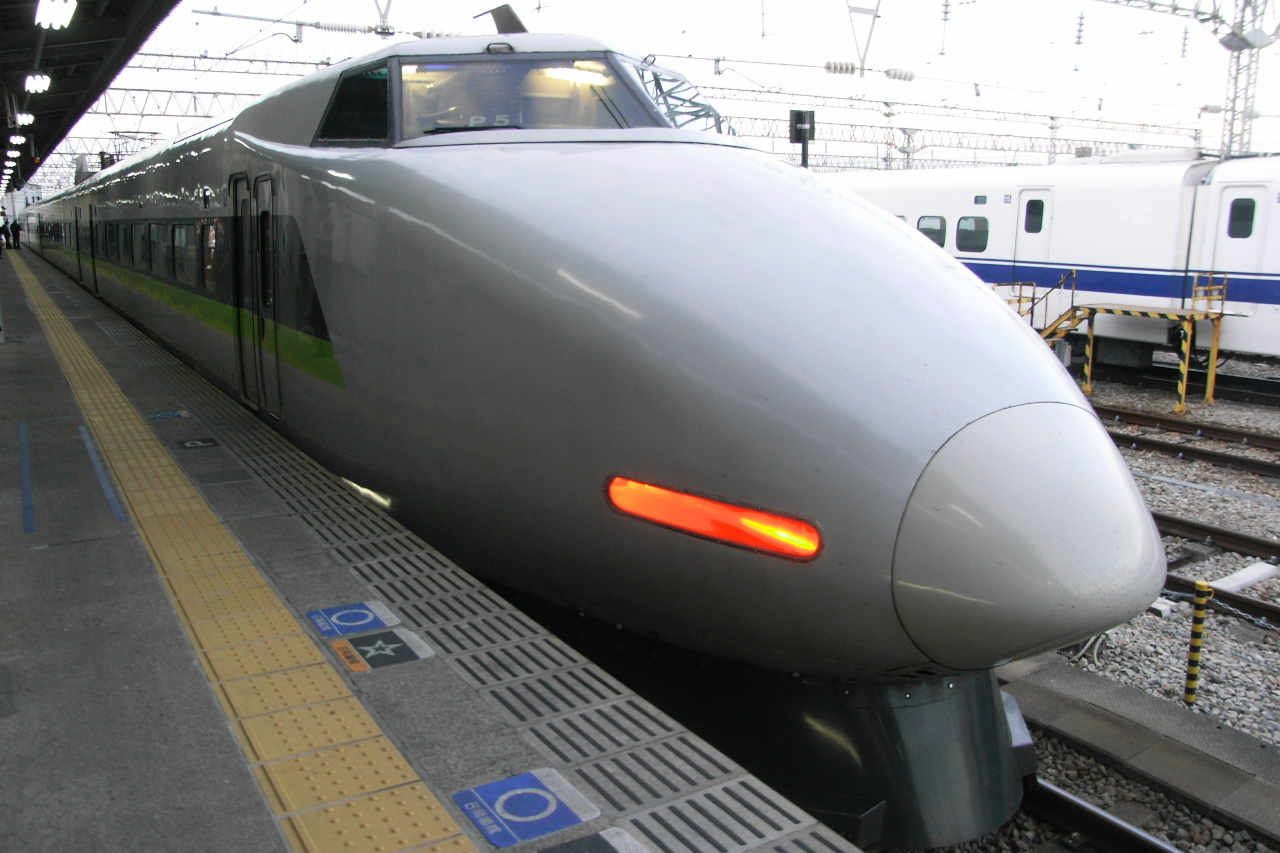
A 100 series set at Hakataminami Station

== See also ==
- Gala-Yuzawa Line, a similar line on the Jōetsu Shinkansen
