= Nagoya skipping =

Japanese cultural phenomenon

Nagoya skipping (Japanese: 名古屋飛ばし, Hepburn: Nagoya-tobashi) is a slang term used for the phenomenon where major concerts and events avoid Nagoya, the fourth most populous city in Japan and the surrounding Chūkyō metropolitan area. The term originated first in the 1980s, and was popularized across the country in 1992 when a Nozomi service running through the Tokaido Shinkansen skipped Nagoya Station for approximately five years. The term has since been used to describe other problems, such as foreign tourists passing through the area. The phenomenon is blamed for the decline in population in affected areas, as the local population, specifically women aged 18 to 39, have moved to Tokyo citing lack of access to "cutting-edge" culture.

== Description ==
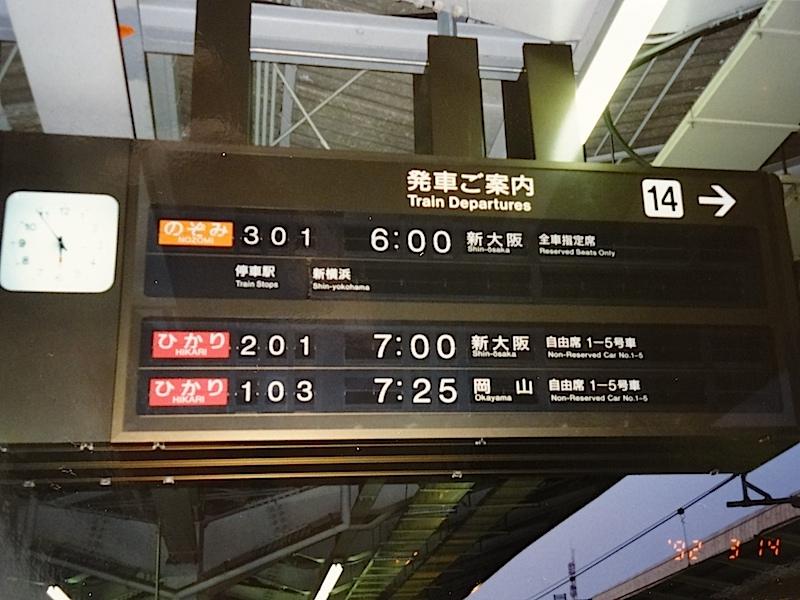
Platform departure board for the Nozomi 301 service at Tokyo station, seen in 1992. Note that the only intermediate stop listed before Shin-Osaka is Shin-Yokohama, not Nagoya.

The term originated when Michael Jackson held 25 live concerts around Japan as a part of the Bad World Tour between 1987 and 1989, but did not hold a concert in Nagoya. It became more well known when the Nozomi service debuted on the Tokaido Shinkansen as the Nozomi 301 service, which departed Tokyo Station exactly at 6 a.m. and skipped Nagoya Station and Kyōto Station to allow businessmen travelling to Osaka to arrive by 9:00 a.m. Another reason for this was that the first services on the line were applied speed limits of 170 km/h in some sections to allow the track ballast to stabilize after the maintenance works ended. Due to this, Nozomi services were expected to not be able to connect the two cities in two and a half hours if they stopped at Nagoya and Kyoto. The Nozomi 301 service was met with heavy backlash from locals, claiming that the problem is about their pride rather than the inconvenience itself. The service itself was merged with the Nozomi 1 service and abolished in 1997, and the service stopped at both mentioned stations.

The term has been used for situations where foreign tourists avoid visiting the Chūkyō metropolitan area as well. Nagoya has been labeled as "boring" by visitors. A 2016 survey found Nagoya as "the most boring city in Japan" out of eight major cities with the city ranking last in nearly every category. Chubu Centrair International Airport, which serves the metropolitan area has been suffering from lack of return of foreign tourists compared to Haneda Airport and Kansai International Airport.

The term continues to be used for concerts as well. In 2023, Osaka and Tokyo hosted about 51% of live concerts held in Japan, while Nagoya hosted just 7%. Poor access around Nagoya Station, and residents of the area being seen as likely to hesitate to spend money on live concerts, have been blamed for the lack of live events in the area.
