= Shin-Onomichi Station =

High speed rail station in Onomichi, Hiroshima prefecture, Japan

Shin-Onomichi Station 新尾道駅
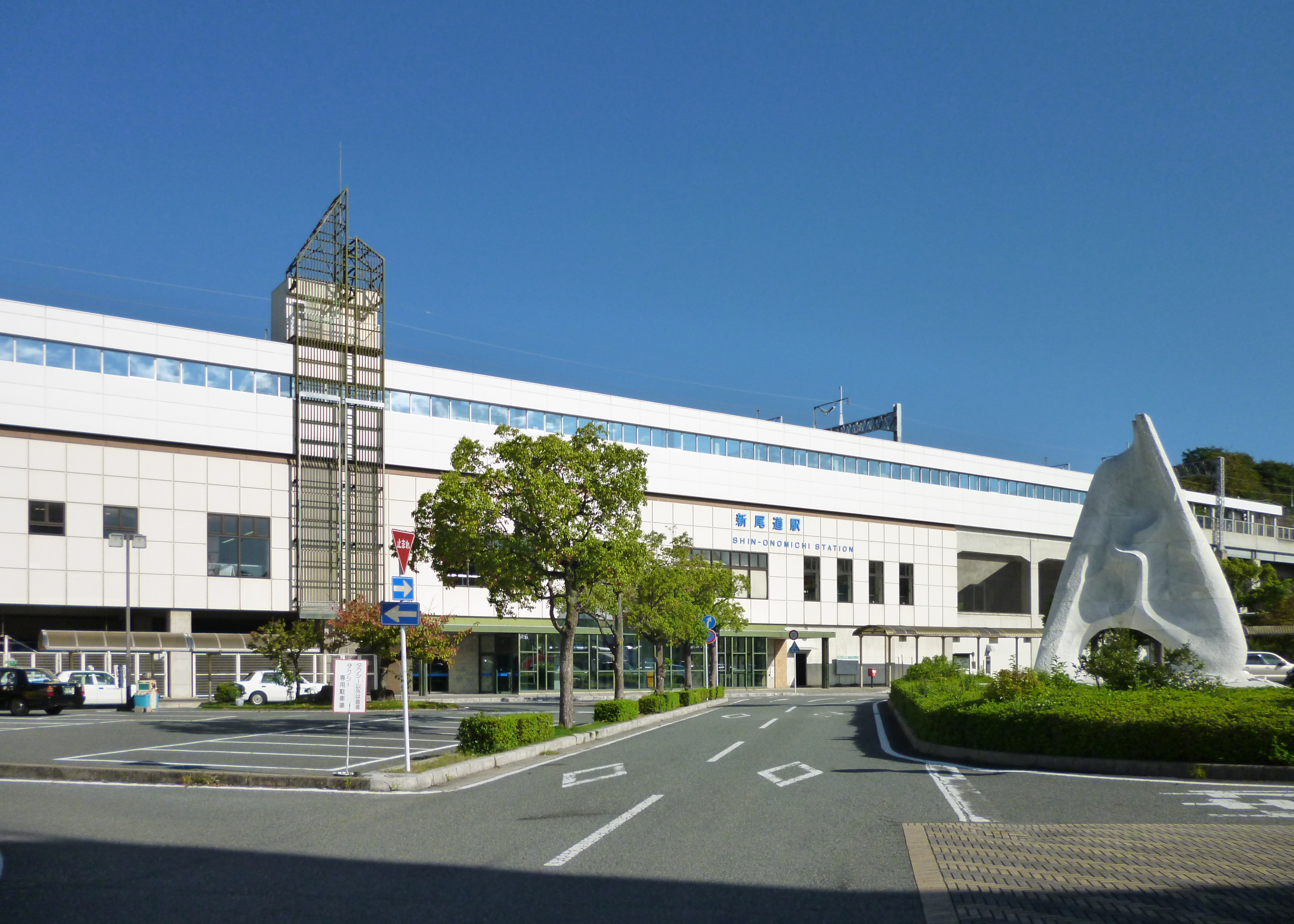
- The south side of Shin-Onomichi Station in October 2018

General information
- Location: 9381-4 Kuriharacho, Onomichi-shi, Hiroshima-ken 722-0022; Japan
- Coordinates: 34°25′48.3″N 133°11′25.2″E
- Owner: West Japan Railway Company
- Operator: West Japan Railway Company
- Line: San'yō Shinkansen
- Distance: 811.3 km (504.1 miles) from Tokyo
- Platforms: 2 side platforms
- Tracks: 2

Construction
- Structure type: Elevated
- Accessible: Yes

Other information
- Status: Staffed (Midori no Madoguchi)
- Website: Official website

History
- Opened: 13 March 1988; 38 years ago

Passengers
- FY2019: 1090

Services
Preceding station	JR West	Following station
Mihara towards Hakata or Hakataminami	San'yō Shinkansen Kodama	Fukuyama towards Shin-Ōsaka
Location
- Location within Hiroshima Prefecture Location within Japan

Shin-Onomichi Station (Japanese: 新尾道駅, Hepburn: Shin-Onomichi-eki; lit. 'New Onomichi Station') is a railway station in the city of Onomichi, Hiroshima, Japan. It is operated by the West Japan Railway Company (JR West).

== Lines ==
Shin-Onomichi Station is served by the Sanyo Shinkansen line and is 258.7 kilometers from the terminus of the line at Shin-Osaka and 811.3 kilometers from Tokyo.

== Station Layout ==
The station has two elevated opposed elevated side platforms, with the station building underneath. The station has a Midori no Madoguchi staffed ticket office. Hikari (train) services stop early morning.

=== Platforms ===
1	■ San'yō Shinkansen	for Hiroshima, Hakata and Kagoshima-Chūō
2	■ San'yō Shinkansen	for Okayama, Shin-Osaka and Tokyo

== History ==
The station opened on 13 March 1988. With the privatization of the Japanese National Railways (JNR) on 1 April 1987, the station came under the control of JR West.

== Passenger statistics ==
In fiscal 2019, the station was used by an average of 1090 passengers daily.

== Surrounding area ==
- Japan National Route 184
- Japan National Route 2 (Onomichi Bypass)

== See also ==
- List of railway stations in Japan
