= San'yō Shinkansen =

High-speed railway line between Osaka and Fukuoka, Japan

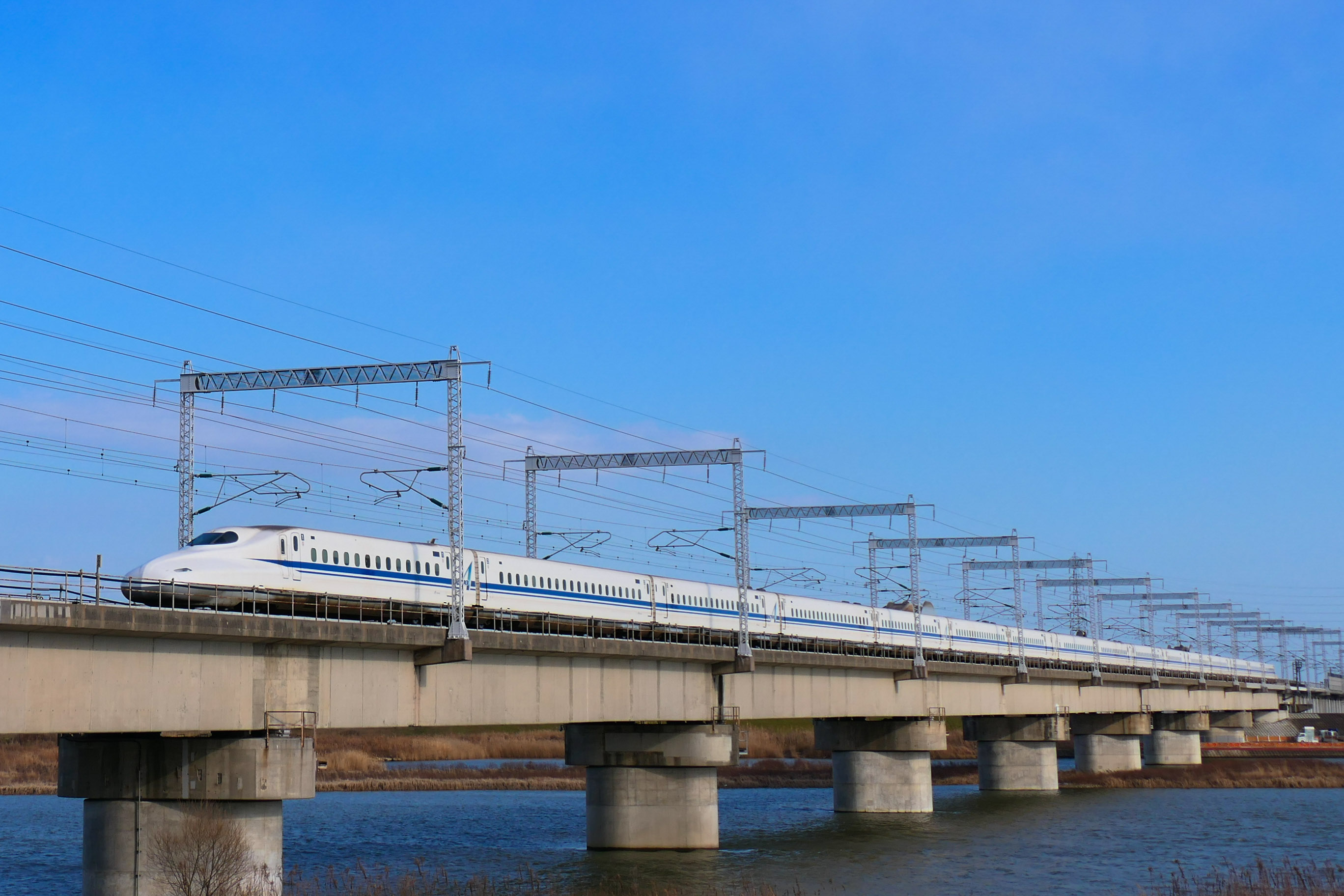
- N700A series Shinkansen operating between Nishi-Akashi and Himeji

Overview
- Native name: 山陽新幹線
- Owner: JR West
- Locale: Osaka, Hyōgo, Okayama, Hiroshima, Yamaguchi and Fukuoka prefectures
- Termini: Shin-Ōsaka; Hakata
- Stations: 19
- Color on map: Blue

Service
- Type: High-speed rail (Shinkansen)
- System: Shinkansen
- Services: Mizuho, Sakura, Nozomi, Hikari, Kodama
- Operator: JR West
- Depot: Osaka · Okayama · Hiroshima · Hakata
- Rolling stock: 500; 700; N700A; N700S
- Daily ridership: 110,004 (FY2014)

History
- Opened: 15 March 1972; 54 years ago

Technical
- Line length: 553.7 km (344.1 mi)
- Num of tracks: 2
- Track gauge: 1,435 mm (4 ft 8 1/2 in) standard gauge
- Minimum radius: 4,000 m (2.5 mi; 13,000 ft)
- Electrification: Overhead line, 25 kV 60 Hz AC
- Operating speed: 300 km/h (190 mph)
- Signalling: Cab signalling
- Train protection system: ATC-NS
- Maximum incline: 1.5%
Route map
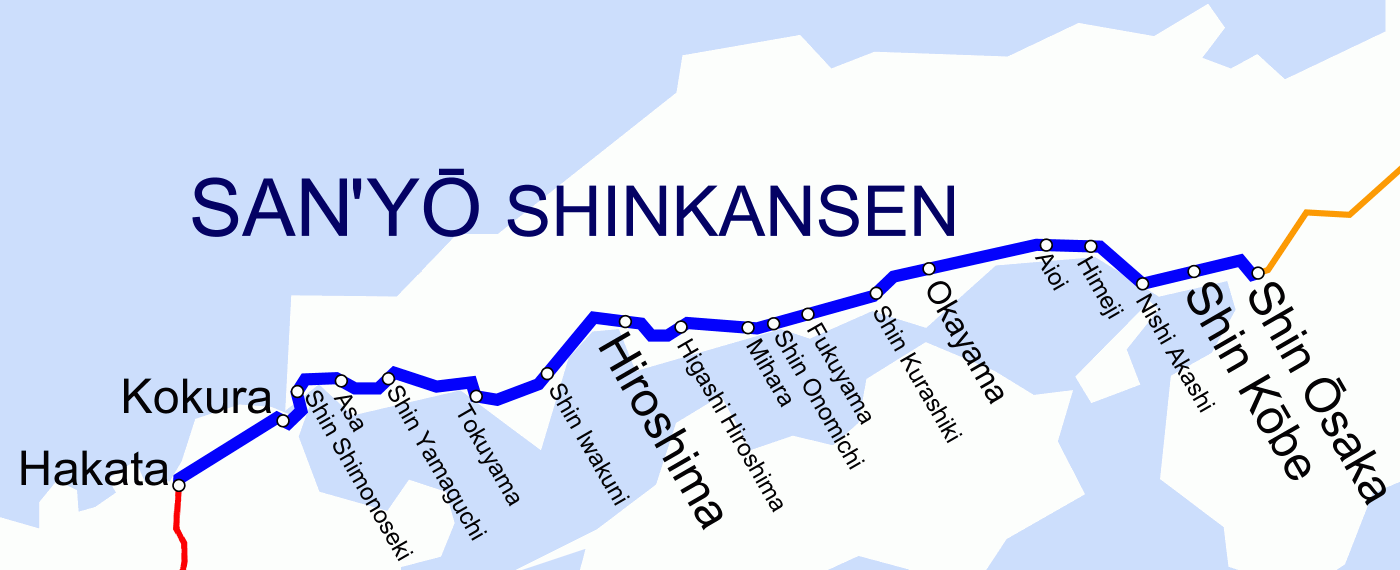

The San'yō Shinkansen (Japanese: 山陽新幹線; lit. 'Southern Mountain new main line') is a line of the Japanese Shinkansen high-speed rail network, connecting Shin-Osaka in Osaka with Hakata Station in Fukuoka, the two largest cities in western Japan. Operated by the West Japan Railway Company (JR West), it is a westward continuation of the Tōkaidō Shinkansen and also serves other major cities in between on Honshu and Kyushu islands such as Kobe, Himeji, Okayama, Hiroshima, and Kitakyushu, through the Shin-Kanmon Tunnel. The Kyushu Shinkansen continues south of Hakata to Kagoshima. The San'yō Shinkansen connects Hakata with Osaka in two and a half hours, with trains operating at a maximum speed of 300 km/h (186 mph) for most of the journey. Some Nozomi trains operate continuously on San'yō and Tōkaidō Shinkansen lines, connecting Tokyo and Hakata in five hours.

== History ==
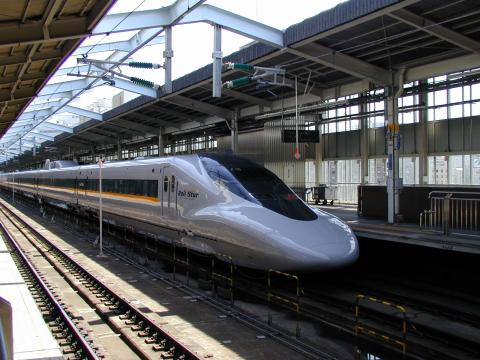
700 series Hikari Rail Star train

Construction of the San'yō Shinkansen between Shin-Ōsaka and Okayama was authorized on 9 September 1965, and commenced on March 16, 1967. Construction between Okayama and Hakata commenced on 10 February 1970. The Shin-Ōsaka to Okayama segment opened on March 15, 1972; the remainder of the line opened on March 10, 1975. The first Hikari trains, using 0 series trains, made the Shin-Ōsaka to Hakata run in 3 hours 44 minutes. This was shortened to 2 hours 59 minutes in 1986 with an increase in maximum speed to 220 km/h (140 mph). 100 series trains, introduced in 1989, boosted maximum speed to 230 km/h (140 mph) and reduced travel time to 2 hours 49 minutes.

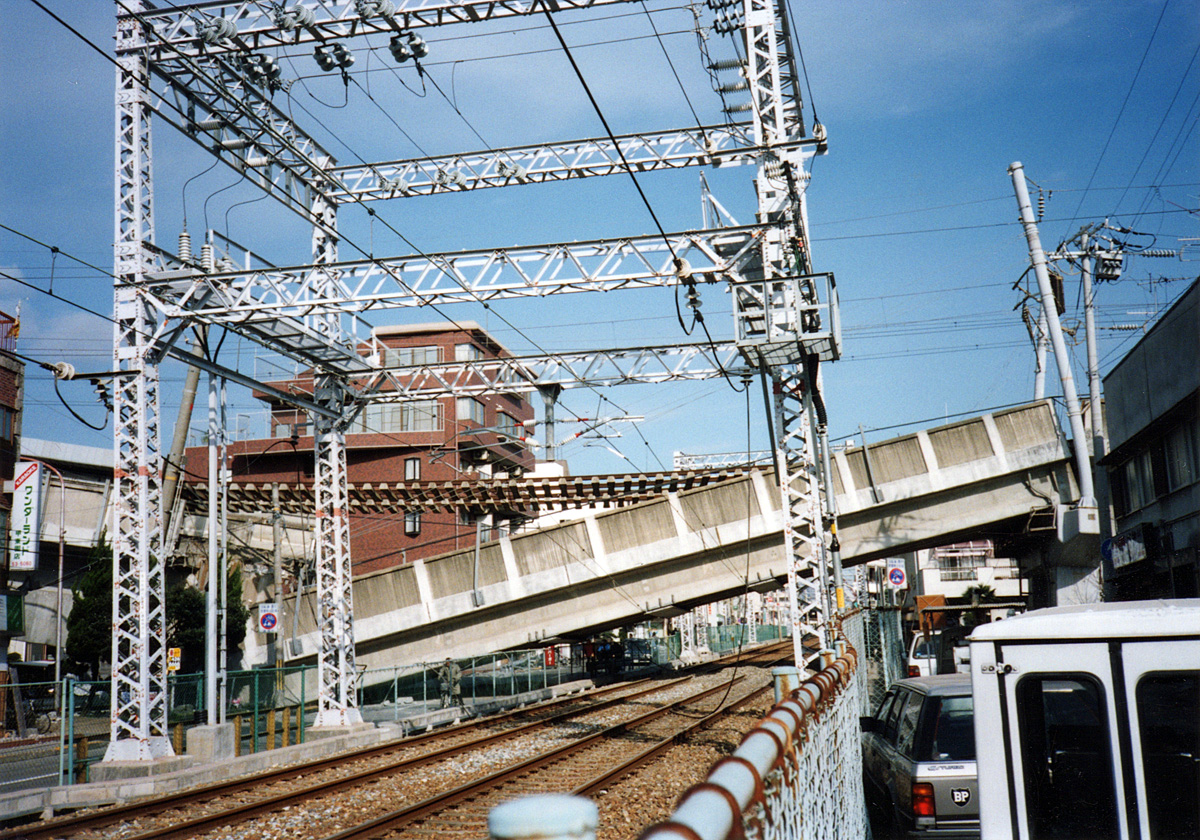
Damage following the Great Hanshin earthquake in Nishinomiya, Hyogo

Tokyo to Hakata Nozomi services began on 18 March 1993, using 300 series trains. The Shin-Ōsaka to Hakata run was reduced to 2 hours 32 minutes, at a maximum speed of 270 km/h (170 mph). On 22 March 1997, the 500 series entered service on Nozomi services between Shin-Ōsaka and Hakata, reducing that run to 2 hours 17 minutes at a maximum speed of 300 km/h (186 mph).

The 700 series was introduced on Tokyo-Hakata Nozomi services on 13 March 1999, coinciding with the opening of Asa Station, and on 11 March 2000, 700 series trains were introduced on Hikari Rail Star services.

Ogori Station was renamed Shin-Yamaguchi Station on 1 October 2003.

The N700 series was launched on Nozomi services on 1 July 2007, with a top speed of 300 km/h (186 mph) (compared to 285 km/h or 177 mph for the 700 series).

From the start of the revised timetable on 12 March 2011, new Mizuho and Sakura inter-running services commenced between Shin-Ōsaka and Kagoshima on the Kyushu Shinkansen using new N700-7000 and N700-8000 series 8-car trainsets. This boosted JR West's market share in the Osaka-Kagoshima passenger market from 13% in March 2011 to 35% in March 2012. JR West began offering discounted advance purchase fares on this route in July 2013 in an effort to compete for market share with new low-cost airlines such as Peach. With the launch of Mizuho and Sakura services, nearly all of the Hikari services operating solely on the San'yō Shinkansen (mostly Rail Star services) were discontinued as it was deemed redundant.

=== Future plans ===
In an announcement by JR Central, JR West, and JR Kyushu made on 17 October 2023, the companies stated that all onboard smoking rooms on the Tokaido, San'yo, and Kyushu Shinkansen trains would be abolished by Q2 2024. In addition, all smoking rooms located on station platforms on the Sanyo Shinkansen would also be abolished.

In July 2024 JR West announced that the 500 Series trains would be phased out, and trains on the San'yō Shinkansen standardized to the N700 Series. Four of the existing 500 Series trainsets are expected to be retired by 2026, with the last two retired by 2027.

== Service ==
=== Stopping patterns ===
Kodama trains stop at all stations; other services have varying stopping patterns. All trains stop at Shin-Osaka, Shin-Kobe, Okayama, Hiroshima, Kokura, and Hakata. Travelers using a Japan Rail Pass are required to purchase a special ticket to use the express Nozomi or Mizuho services.

Legend:

●	All trains stop
▲	Some trains stop
｜	All trains pass

=== Stations ===
Station	Distance in km (mi) from		Service					Transfers	Location	
Station	Shin-Ōsaka	Tōkyō	Mizuho	Sakura	Nozomi	Hikari	Kodama	Transfers	Location	
↑ Through services to/from Tōkyō via the Tōkaidō Shinkansen (Note: Only 16-car Nozomi and Hikari services operate through to the Tōkaidō Shinkansen.) ↑	Shin-Ōsaka	Tōkyō								
Shin-Ōsaka	0 (0)	515.4 (320.3)	●	●	●	●	●	Tokaido Shinkansen (through service); JR Kyōto Line (JR-A46); Osaka Higashi Line (JR-F02); Midōsuji Line (M13)	Yodogawa-ku, Osaka	Osaka; Prefecture
Shin-Kōbe	32.6 (20.3)	548.0 (340.5)	●	●	●	●	●	Hokushin Line (S02); Seishin-Yamate Line (S02)	Chūō-ku, Kobe	Hyōgo; Prefecture
Nishi-Akashi	54.8 (34.1)	570.2 (354.3)	｜	▲	▲	▲	●	JR Kōbe Line (JR-A74)	Akashi	Hyōgo; Prefecture
Himeji	85.9 (53.4)	601.3 (373.6)	▲	▲	▲	●	●	JR Kōbe Line (JR-A85); San'yō Line; Kishin Line; Bantan Line; Sanyo Electric Railway Main Line (SY43, Sanyo-Himeji)	Himeji	Hyōgo; Prefecture
Aioi	105.9 (65.8)	621.3 (386.1)	｜	｜	｜	▲	●	San'yō Main Line; Akō Line	Aioi	Hyōgo; Prefecture
Okayama	160.9 (100.0)	676.3 (420.2)	●	●	●	●	●	San'yō Main Line; Uno Line ( Seto-Ōhashi Line); Hakubi Line; Tsuyama Line; Kibi Line; Okayama Electric Tramway Higashiyama Main Line	Kita-ku	Okayama; Prefecture
Shin-Kurashiki	186.7 (116.0)	702.1 (436.3)	｜	｜	｜	▲	●	San'yō Main Line	Kurashiki	Okayama; Prefecture
Fukuyama	217.7 (135.3)	733.1 (455.5)	▲	●	▲	●	●	San'yō Main Line; Fukuen Line	Fukuyama	Hiroshima; Prefecture
Shin-Onomichi	235.1 (146.1)	750.5 (466.3)	｜	｜	｜	▲	●		Onomichi	Hiroshima; Prefecture
Mihara	245.6 (152.6)	761.0 (472.9)	｜	｜	｜	▲	●	San'yō Main Line; Kure Line	Mihara	Hiroshima; Prefecture
Higashi-Hiroshima	276.5 (171.8)	791.9 (492.1)	｜	｜	｜	▲	●		Higashihiroshima	Hiroshima; Prefecture
Hiroshima	305.8 (190.0)	821.2 (510.3)	●	●	●	●	●	San'yō Main Line; Geibi Line; Kabe Line; Kure Line ■M Hiroden Main Line	Minami-ku; Hiroshima	Hiroshima; Prefecture
Shin-Iwakuni	350.0 (217.5)	865.4 (537.7)	｜	｜	｜	▲	●	Nishikigawa Seiryū Line (Seiryū-Shin-Iwakuni)	Iwakuni	Yamaguchi; Prefecture
Tokuyama	388.1 (241.2)	903.5 (561.4)	｜	▲	▲	▲	●	■ San'yō Main Line ■ Gantoku Line	Shūnan	Yamaguchi; Prefecture
Shin-Yamaguchi	429.2 (266.7)	944.6 (586.9)	▲	▲	▲	▲	●	■ San'yō Main Line ■ Yamaguchi Line ■ Ube Line	Yamaguchi	Yamaguchi; Prefecture
Asa	453.3 (281.7)	968.7 (601.9)	｜	｜	｜	｜	●	■ San'yō Main Line ■ Mine Line	San'yō-Onoda	Yamaguchi; Prefecture
Shin-Shimonoseki	477.1 (296.5)	992.5 (616.7)	｜	▲	｜	▲	●	■ San'yō Main Line	Shimonoseki	Yamaguchi; Prefecture
Kokura	497.8 (309.3)	1,013.2 (629.6)	●	●	●	●	●	Kagoshima Main Line (JA28, JA51); Nippō Main Line (JF01); Hitahikosan Line (JI01); Kitakyushu Monorail (01)	Kokurakita-ku, Kitakyūshū	Fukuoka; Prefecture
Hakata	553.7 (344.1)	1,069.1 (664.3)	●	●	●	●	●	Kyūshū Shinkansen (through service); Hakataminami Line (through service); Relay Kamome (Nishi Kyushu Shinkansen connection); JA JB Kagoshima Main Line (JA00/JB00); JC Fukuhoku Yutaka Line (JC00); Airport Line (K11); Nanakuma Line (N18)	Hakata-ku, Fukuoka	Fukuoka; Prefecture
↓ Through services to/from Kagoshima-Chūō via the Kyushu Shinkansen, (Note: Only 8-car Mizuho and Sakura services operate through to the Kyushu Shinkansen.) or Hakataminami via the Hakataminami Line (Note: Only 8-car Kodama services operate through to the Hakataminami Line.) ↓

=== Speed ===
As of 2012, the maximum line speed is, West-bound 285 km/h (175 mph) between Shin-Ōsaka and Shin-Kobe, 275 km/h (170 mph) between Shin-Kobe and Nishi-Akashi, and 300 km/h (185 mph) between Nishi-Akashi and Hakata. East-bound it is 300 km/h (185 mph) between Hakata and Himeji, 275 km/h (170 mph) between Himeji and Shin-Kobe and 300 km/h (185 mph) between Shin-Kobe and Shin-Ōsaka.

== Ridership ==
As of the San'yō Shinkansen's 50th birthday, the line has carried to date 3 billion riders.

=== San'yō Shinkansen Ridership Figures (per year, millions of passengers) ===
Year	FY2005	FY2009	FY2013	FY2017
Ridership	58	62	65	83

== Rolling stock ==
As of March 2020, the following types are used on San'yō Shinkansen services.

- 500-7000 series: Hikari Rail Star / Kodama services
- 700–7000 series: Hikari Rail Star / Kodama services
- N700 series: Nozomi / Hikari / Kodama services
- N700-7000/8000 series: Mizuho / Sakura / Kodama services
- N700S series: Nozomi / Hikari / Kodama services
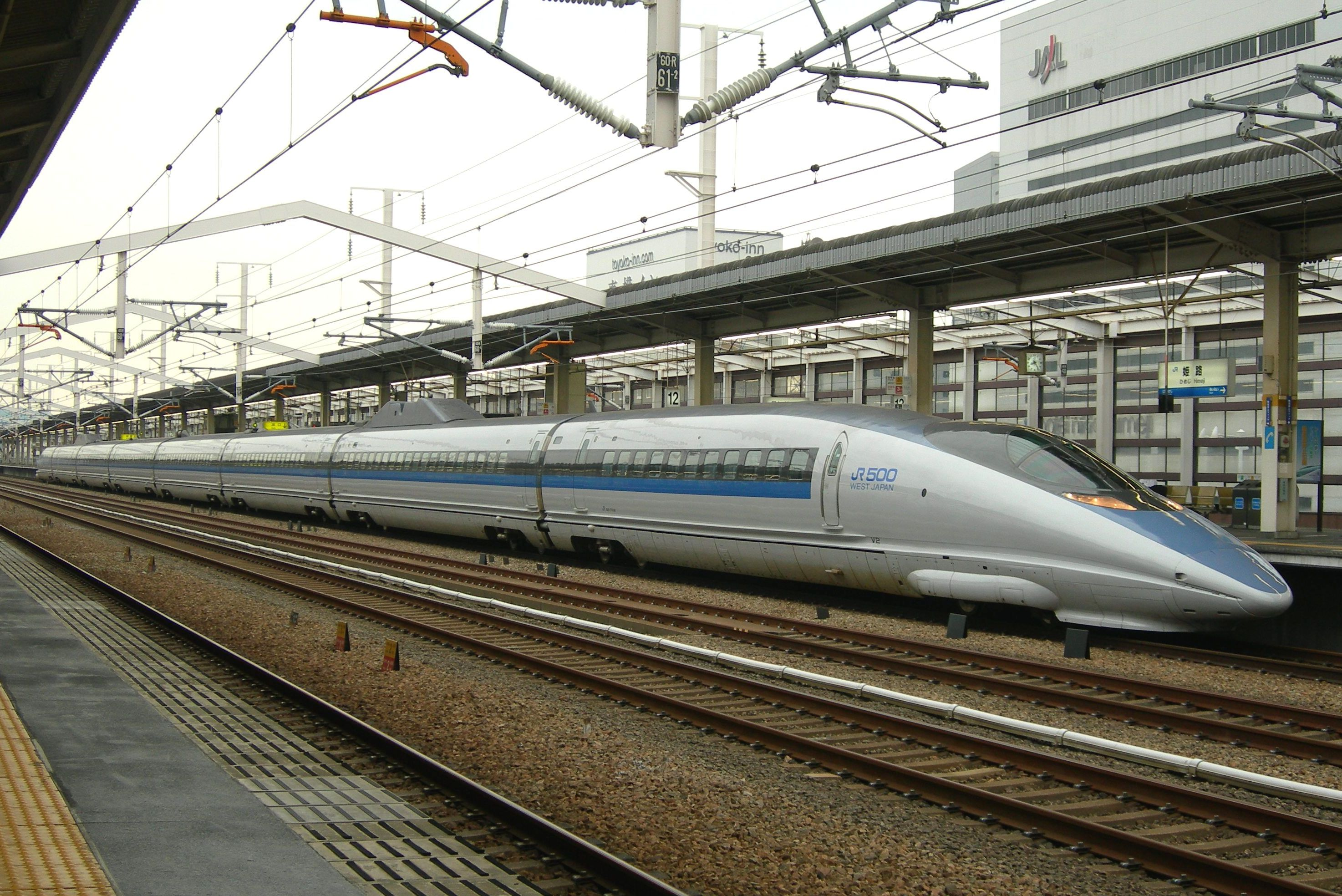
JR West 500 series Kodama, August 2009

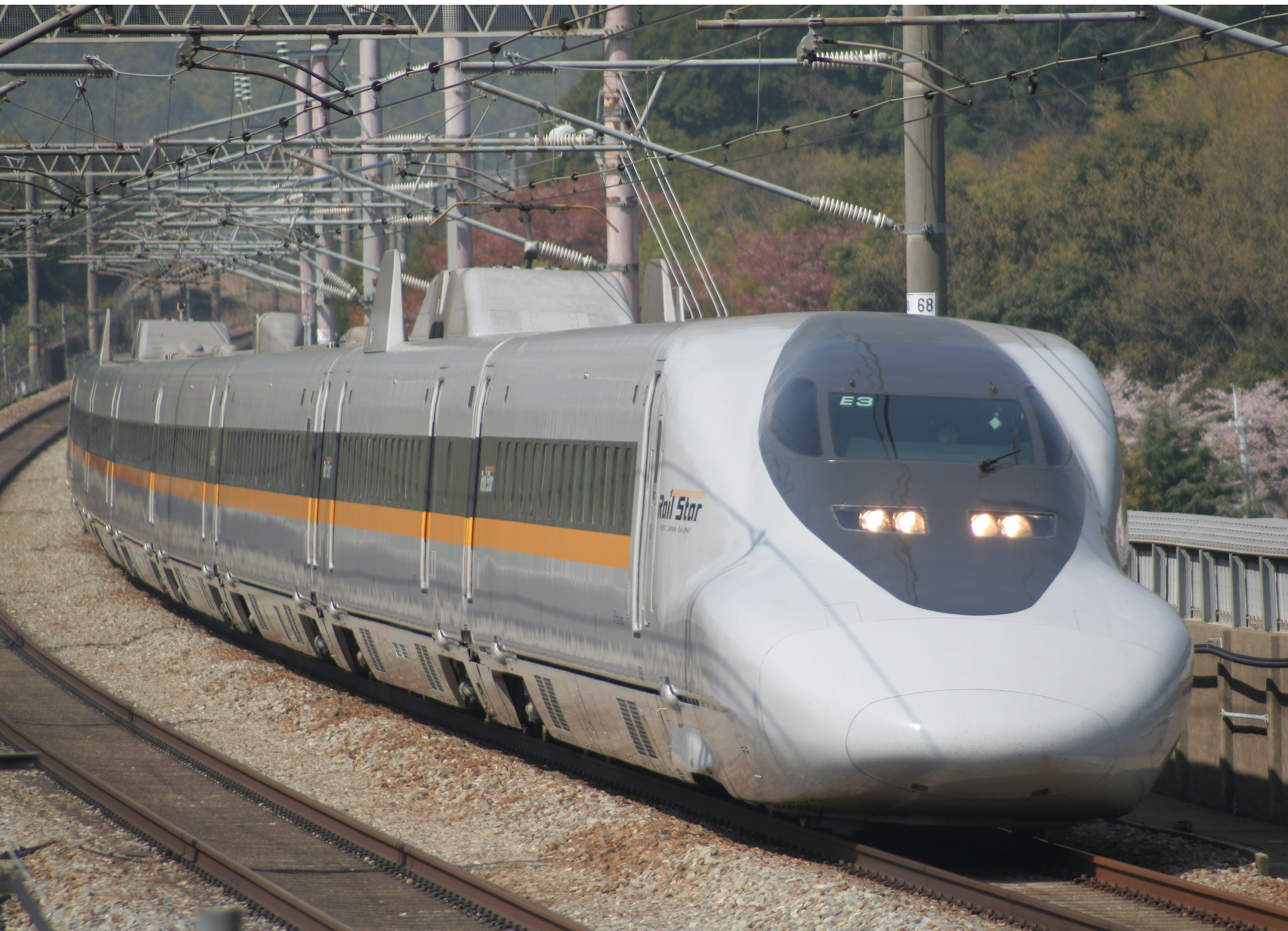
700 series Hikari Rail Star, April 2009

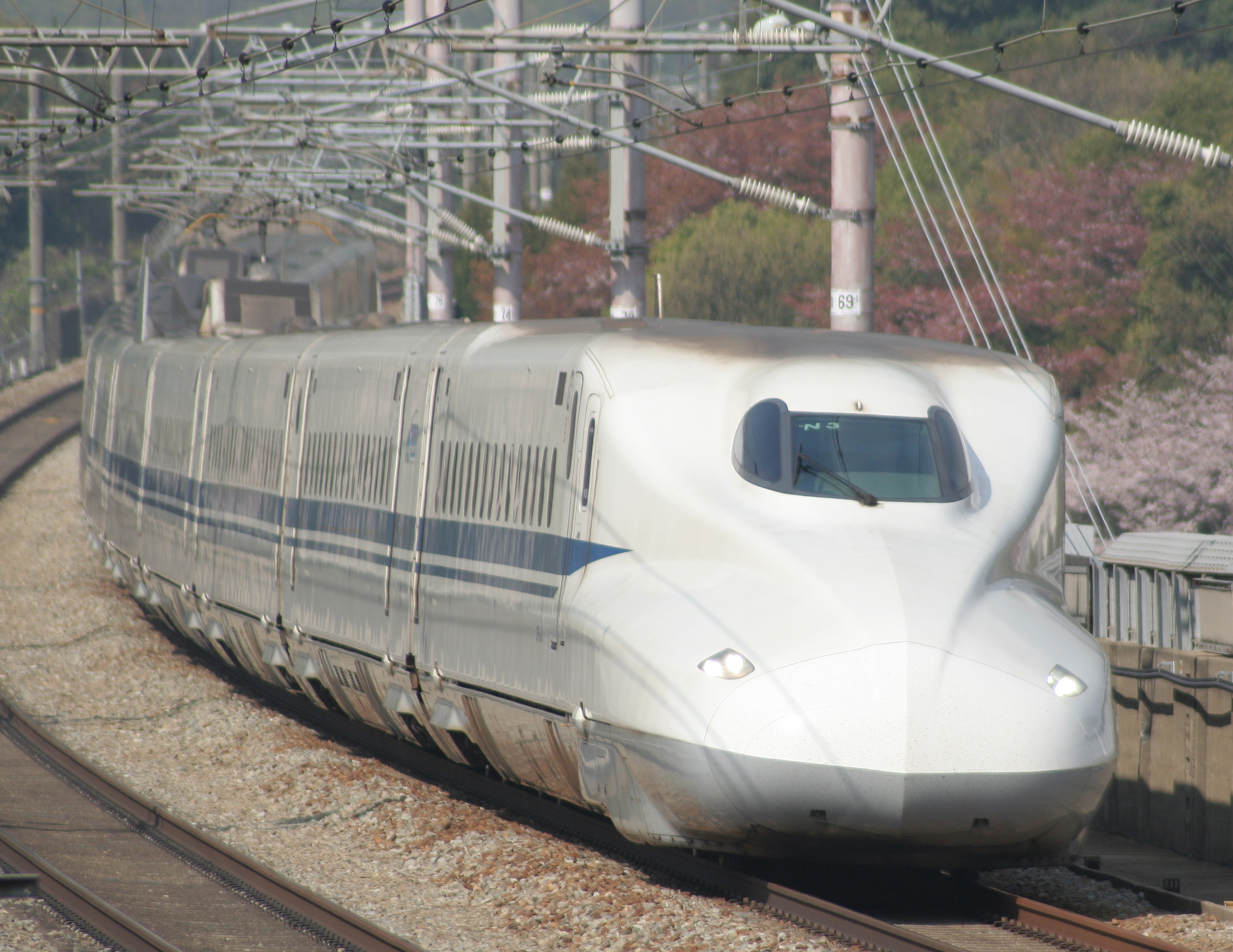
JR West N700 series, April 2009

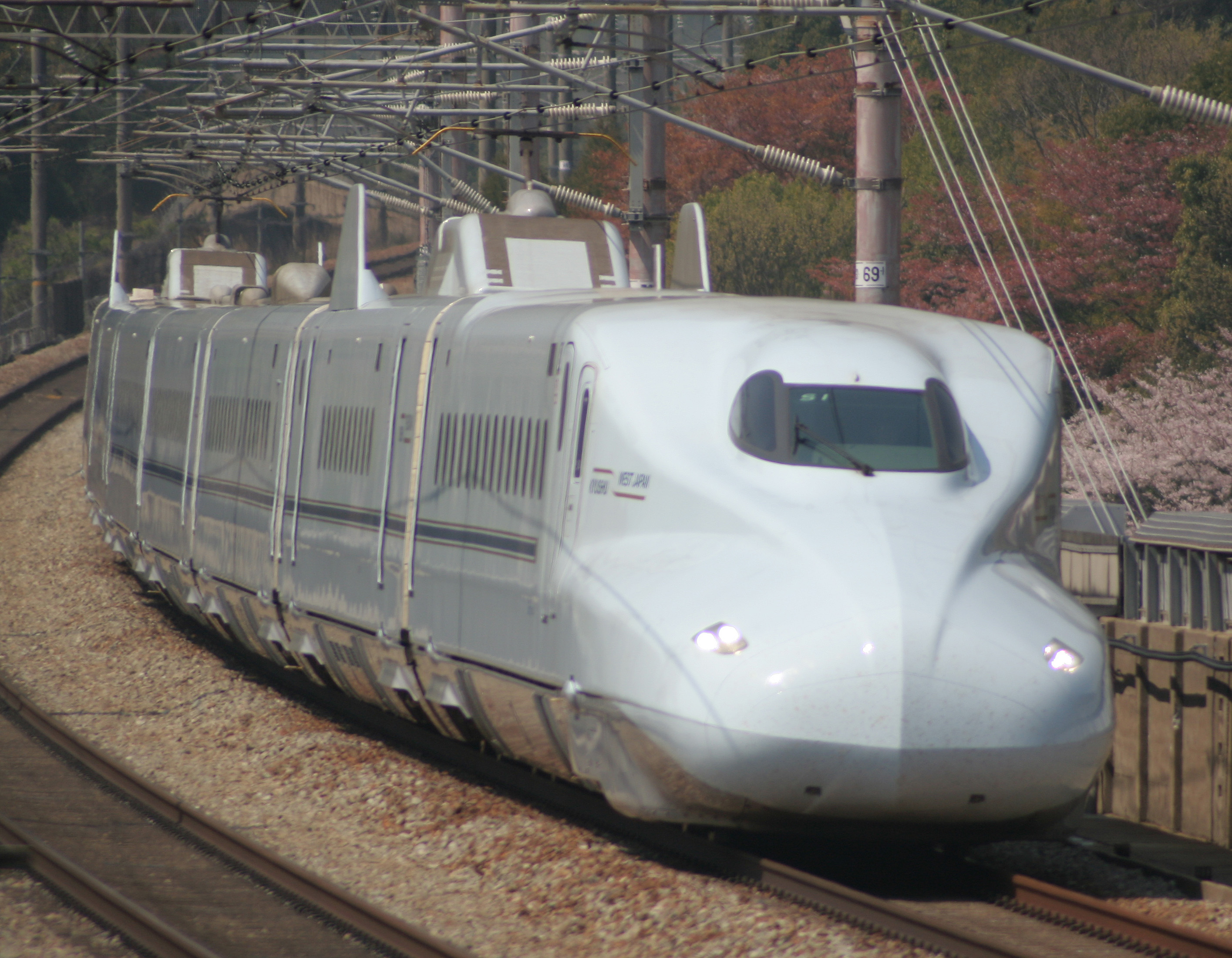
A JR West N700-7000 series trainset

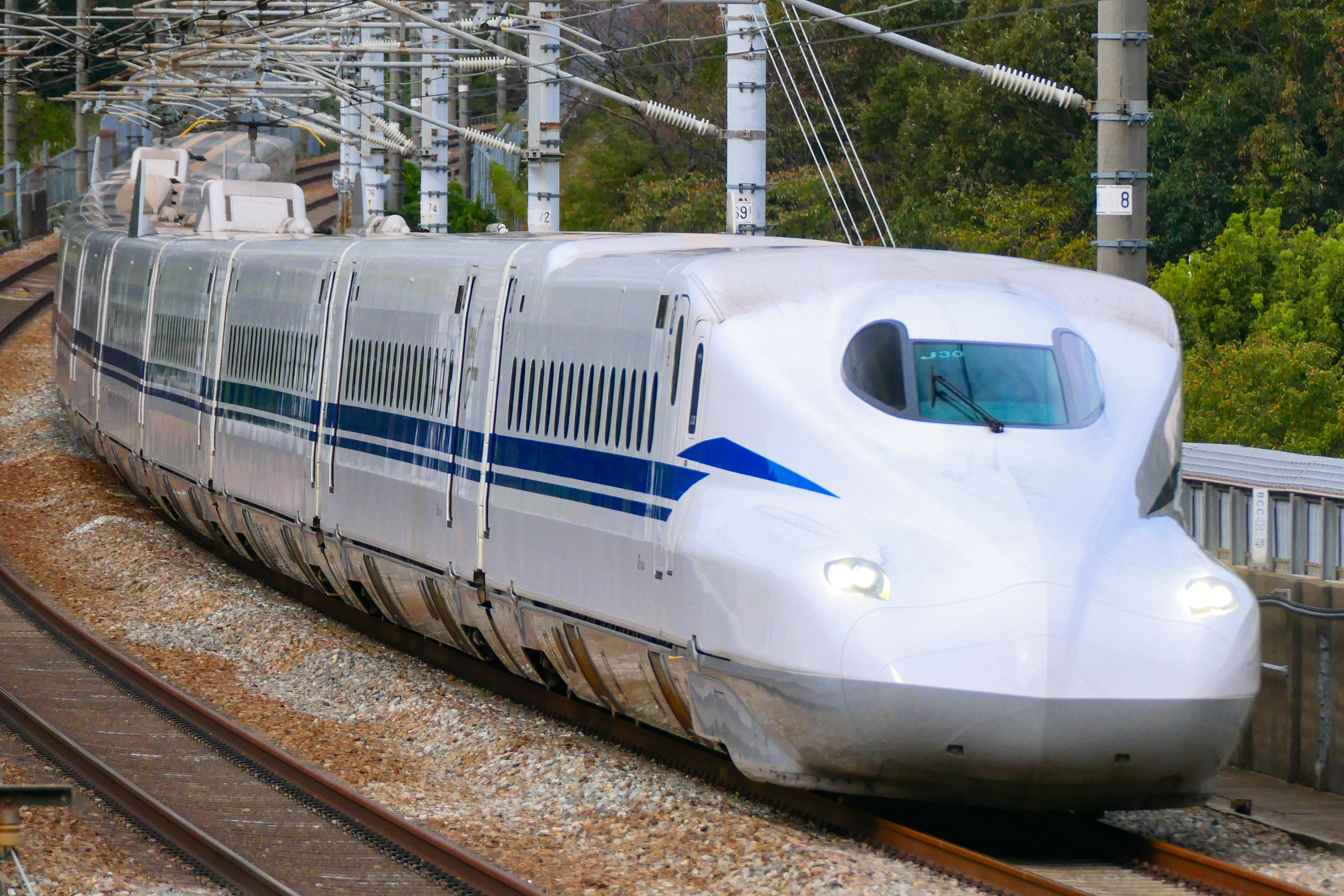
A JR Central N700S series

=== Former rolling stock ===
- 0 series: Hikari / Kodama services
- 100 series: Hikari / Kodama services
- 300 series: Nozomi / Hikari / Kodama services
- 500 series: Nozomi / Hikari / Kodama services
- 700-0 series: Nozomi / Hikari / Kodama services
- 700-3000 series: Nozomi / Hikari / Kodama services
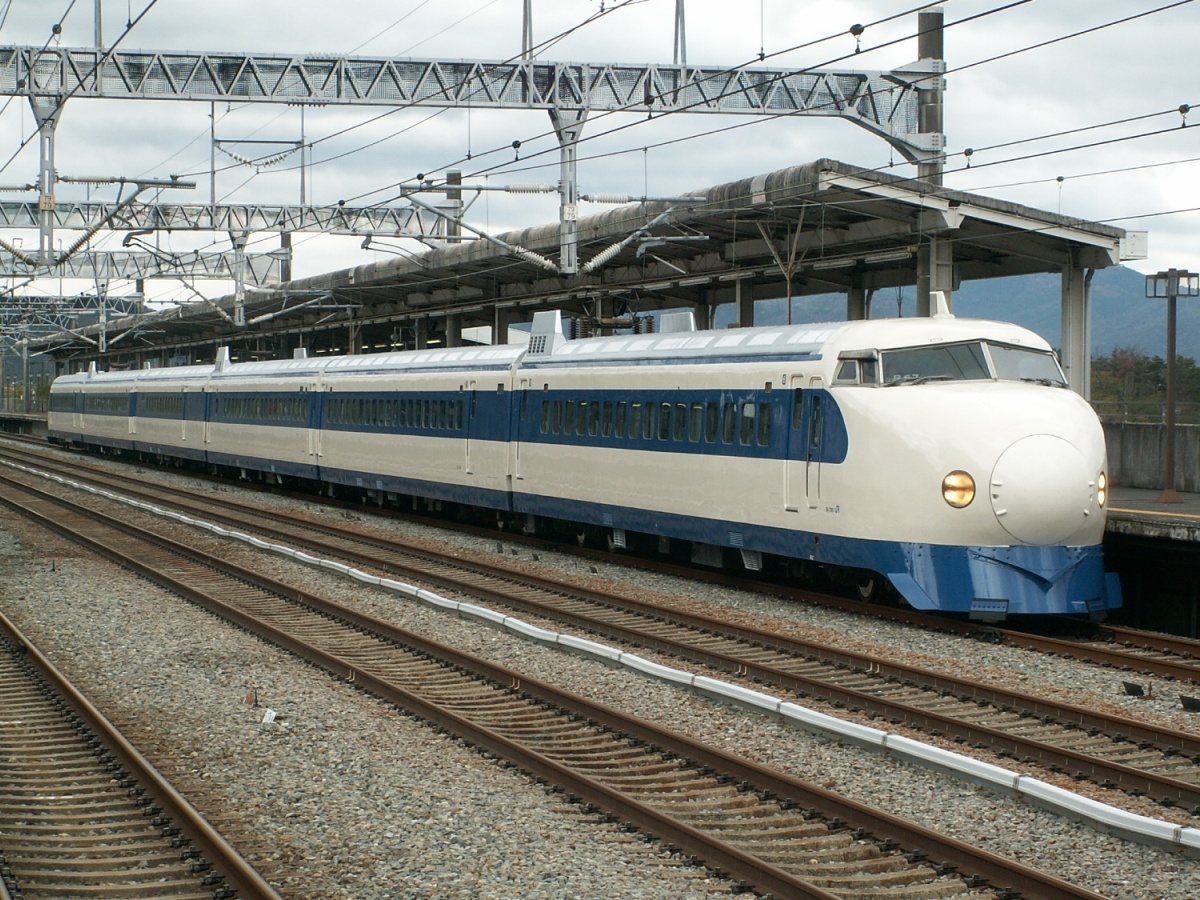
JR West 0 series Kodama at Higashi-Hiroshima Station, April 2008

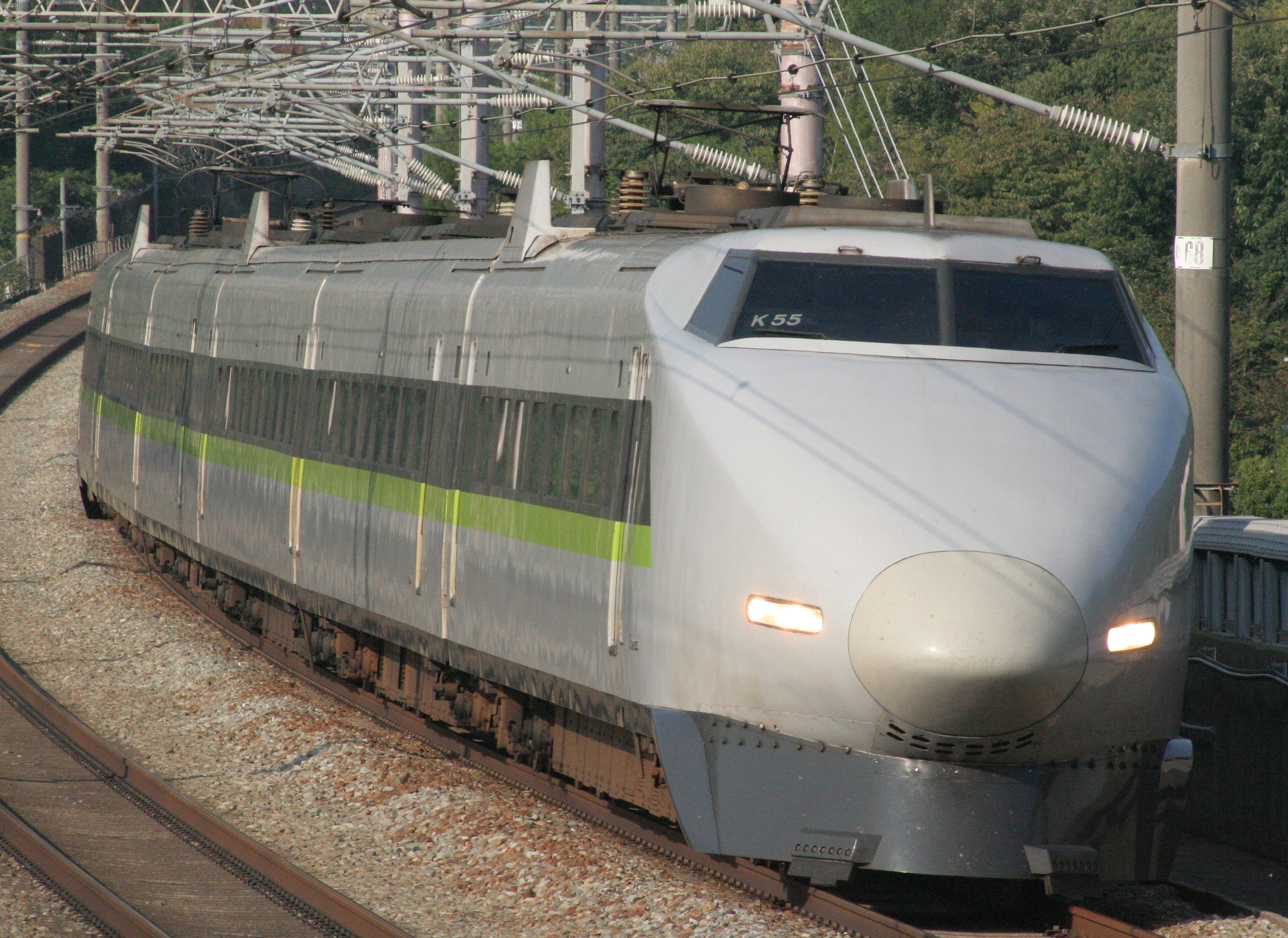
JR West 100 series on a Kodama service, October 2008

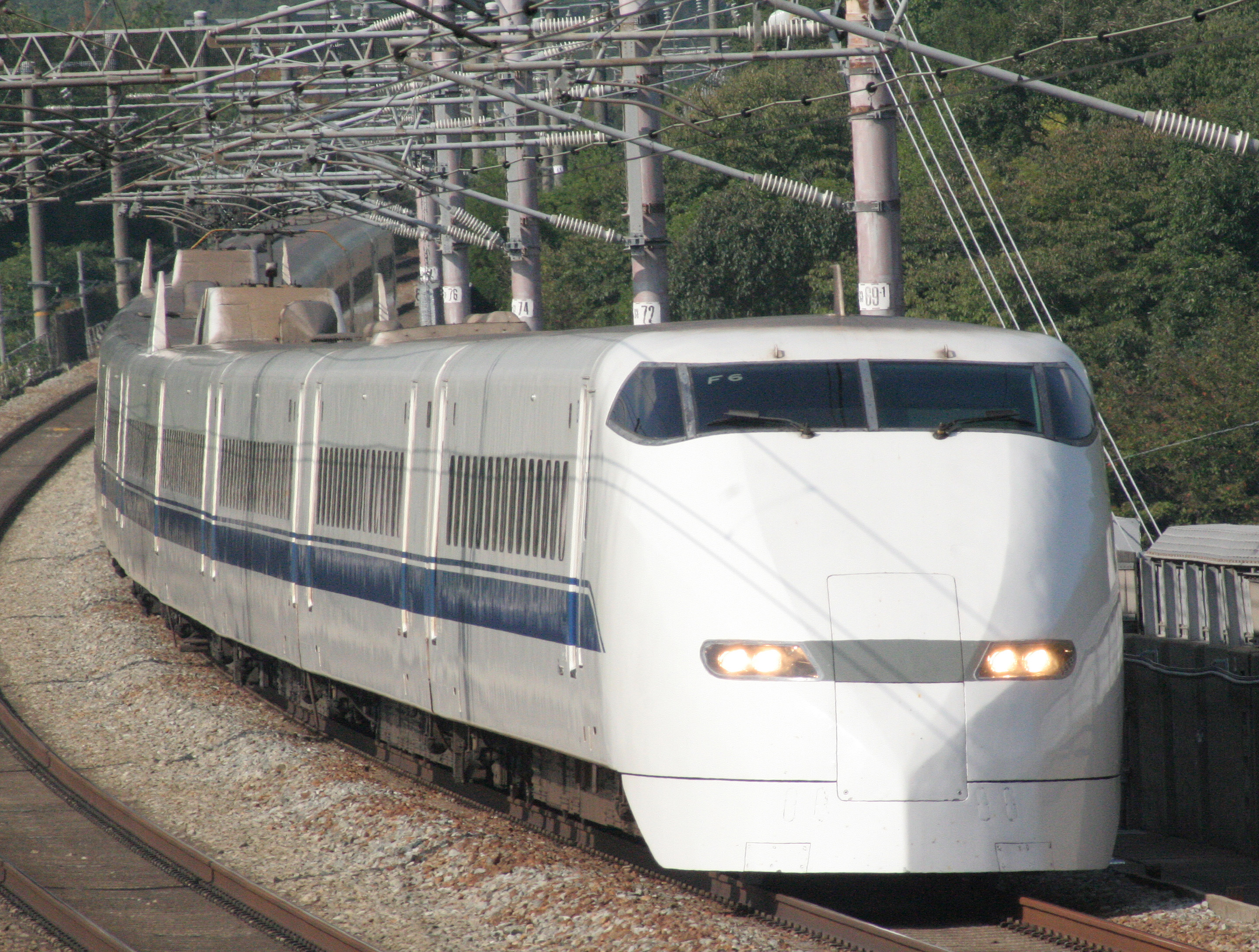
JR West 300 series on a Hikari service, October 2008

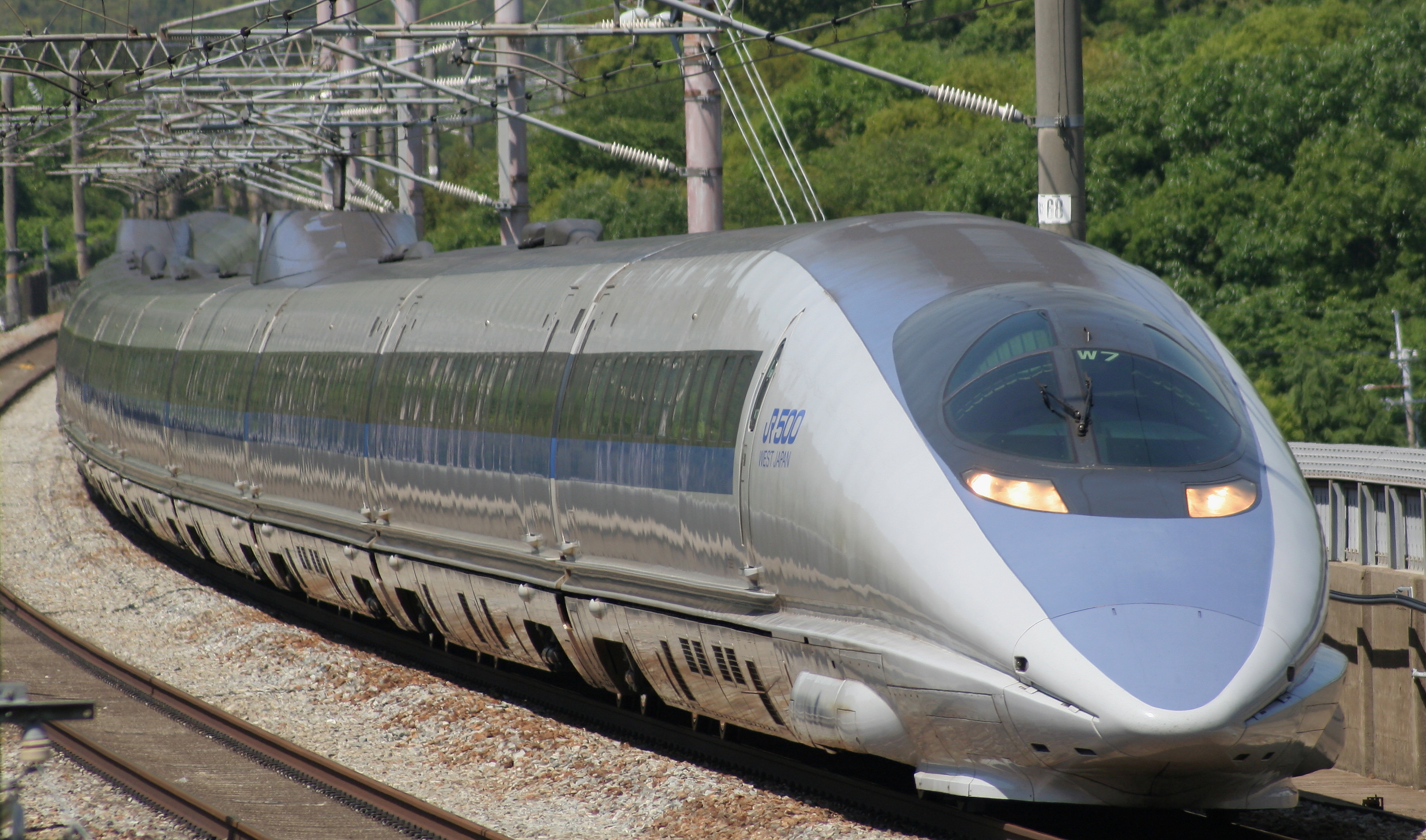
JR West 500 series on a Nozomi service, May 2008

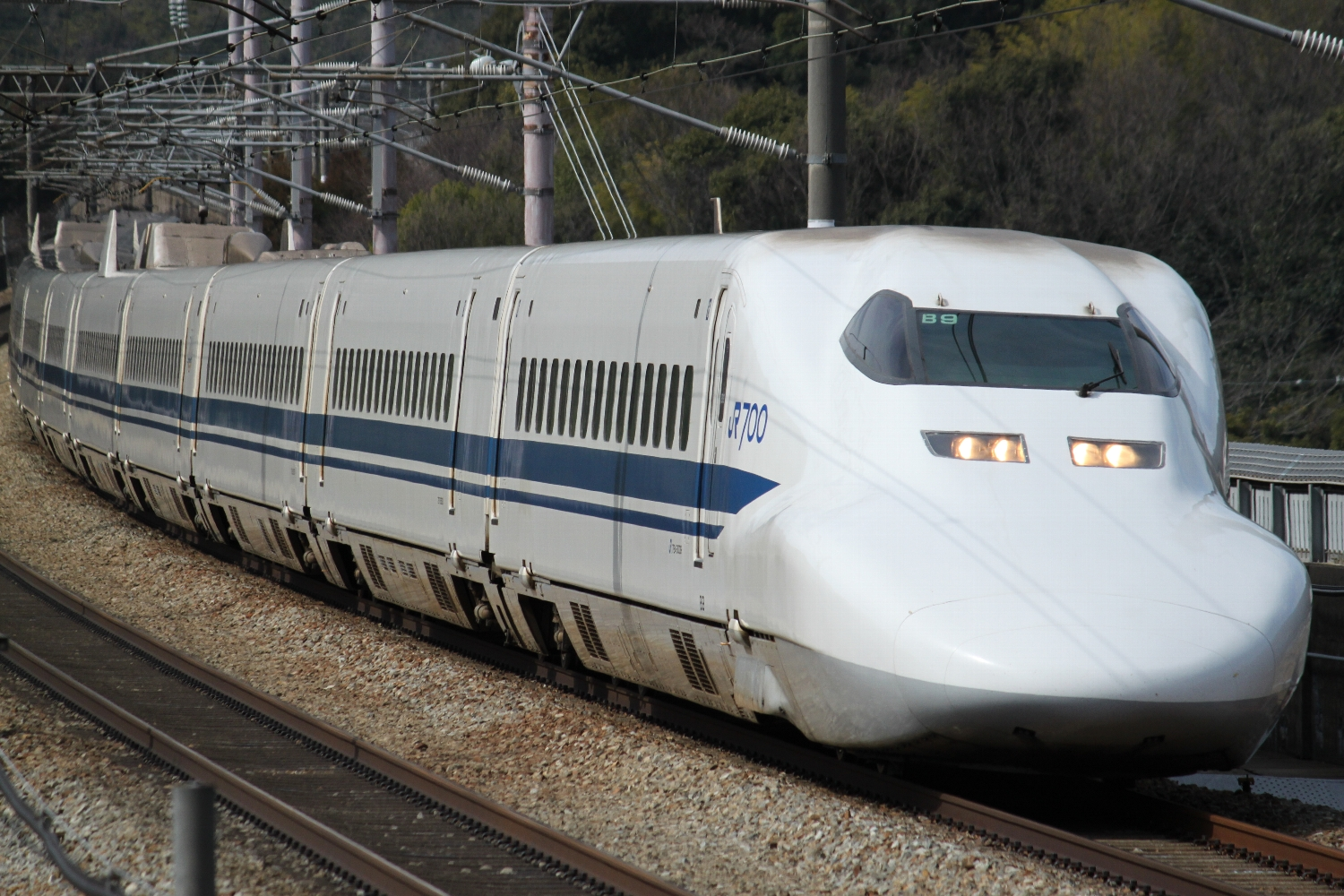
JR West 700 series on a Nozomi service, March 2010

=== Non-revenue earning types ===
Current

- 923 (Set T5)
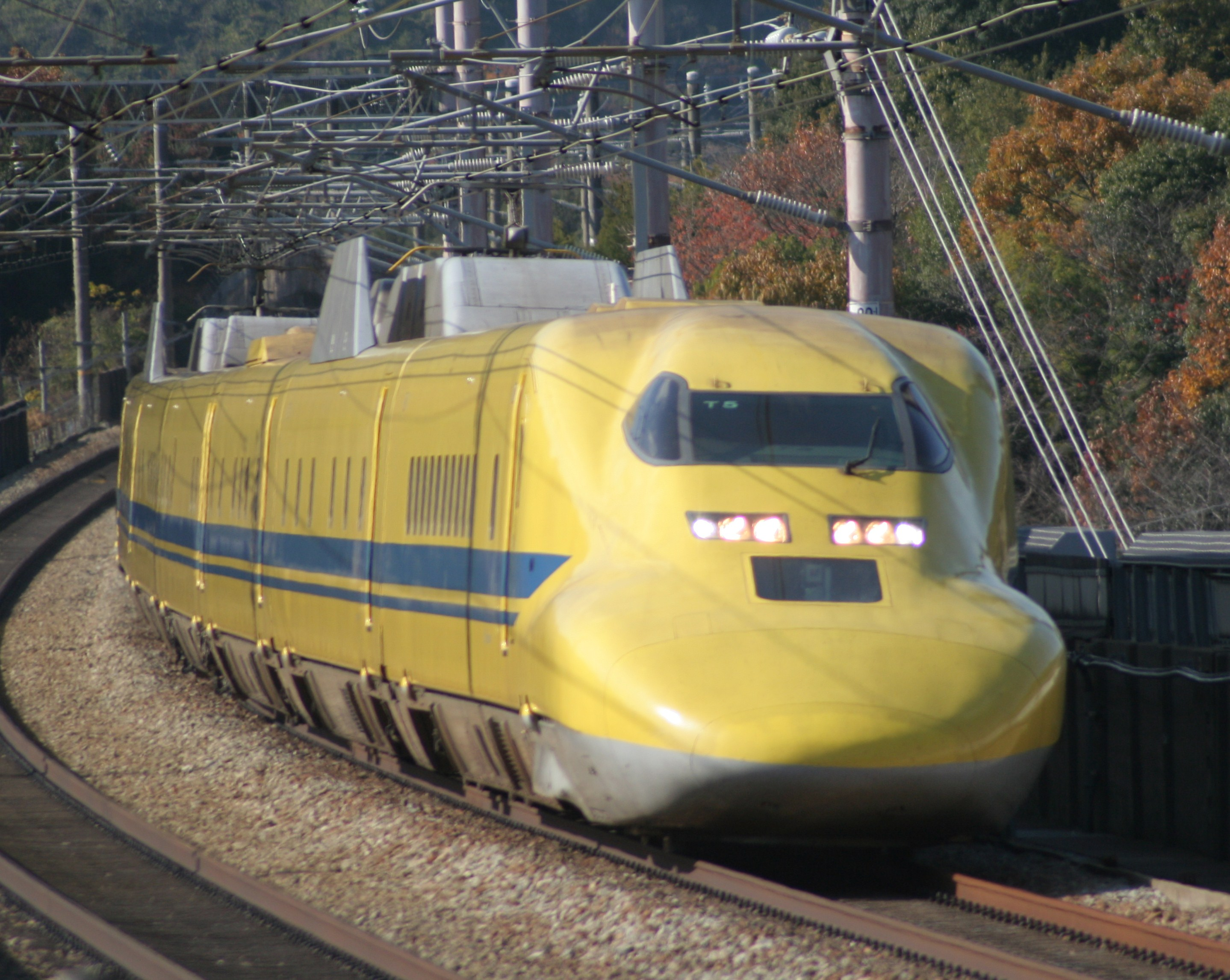
JR West's Class 923 "Doctor Yellow" set T5 on the Sanyo Shinkansen, December 2009

Former

- 922 (Set T3) (1979 to 2005)
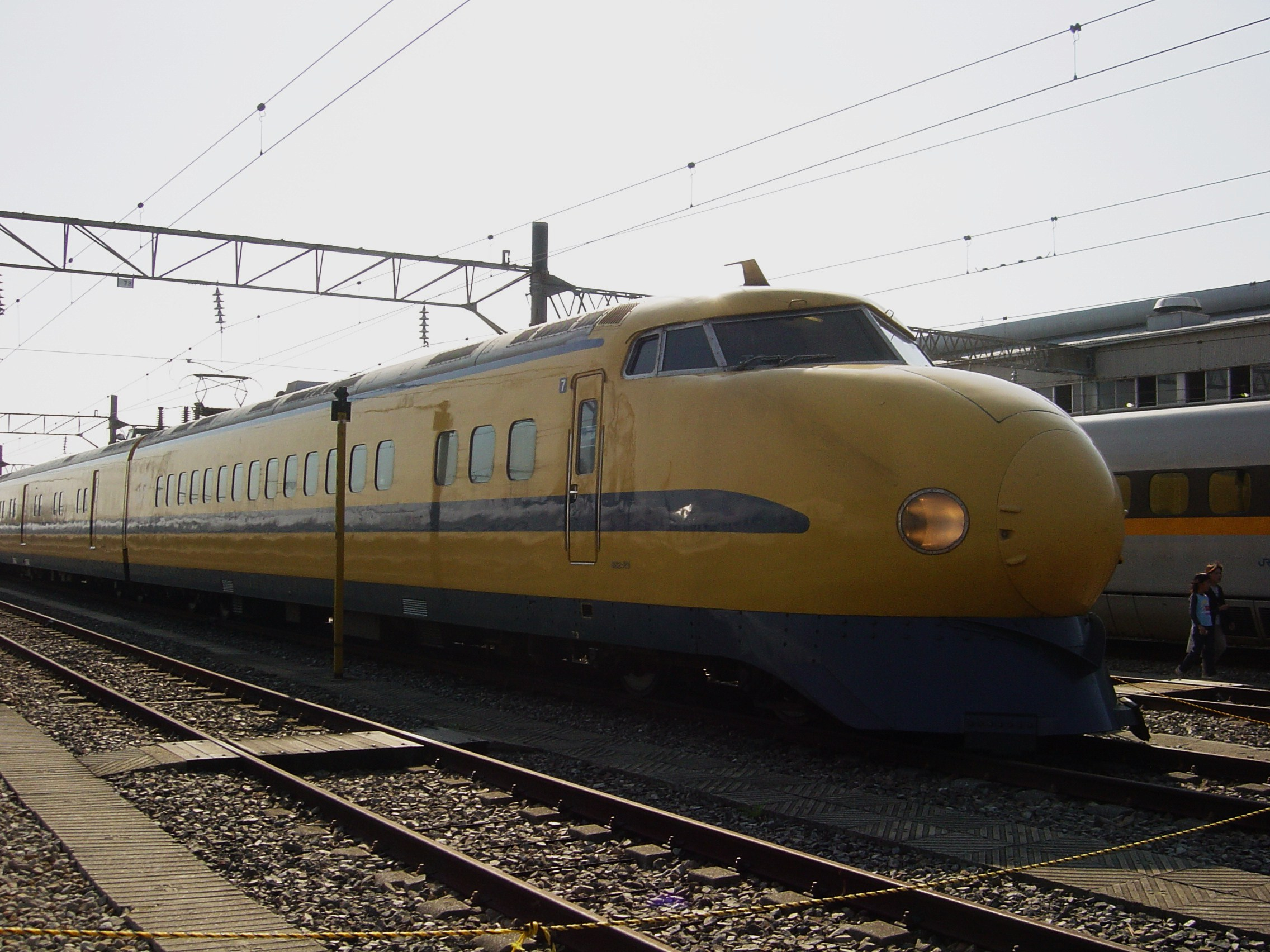
JR West Class 922 "Doctor Yellow" set T3, October 2004
