= Nozomi (train) =

Japanese high-speed Shinkansen train service

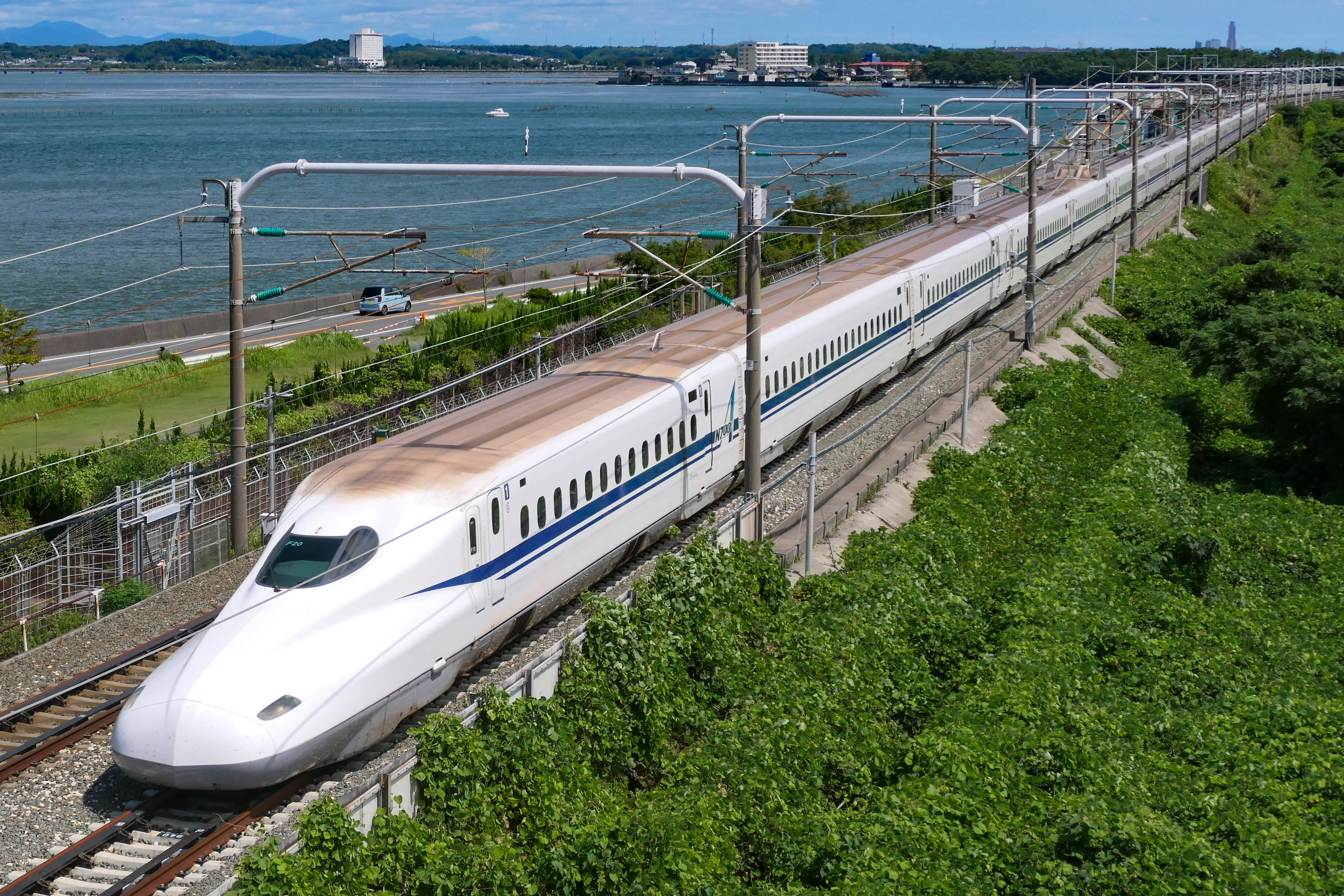
- N700A series set, September 2021

Overview
- Service type: Shinkansen (Express)
- Status: Operational
- First service: 1934 (Express); 1992 (Shinkansen)
- Current operators: JR Central, JR West

Route
- Termini: Tokyo; Hakata
- Lines used: Tōkaidō Shinkansen; San'yō Shinkansen

On-board services
- Class: Green/standard
- Catering facilities: Trolley service (Green Cars)

Technical
- Rolling stock: N700A series, N700S series
- Track gauge: 1,435 mm (4 ft 8 1/2 in) standard gauge
- Electrification: Overhead line, 25 kV 60 Hz AC
- Operating speed: Tōkaidō Shinkansen: 285 km/h (177 mph); San'yō Shinkansen: 300 km/h (186 mph)

Nozomi (Japanese: のぞみ; "Wish" or "Hope") is the fastest train service operating on Japan's Tōkaidō and San'yō Shinkansen lines. Nozomi services reach speeds of up to 300 kilometres per hour (186 mph) between Shin-Ōsaka and Hakata. The fastest Nozomi service covers the 515-kilometre (320 mi) journey between Tokyo and Osaka in 2 hours 21 minutes, while the fastest Tokyo–Hakata service takes 4 hours 45 minutes. As of 2025, services are operated primarily by the newest N700S series trainsets, with some N700A series sets also in use.

Compared with the limited-stop Hikari and local Kodama services, the express Nozomi trains stop only at major stations. On the Tōkaidō Shinkansen, Nozomi services stop only at Shinagawa, Shin-Yokohama, Nagoya, and Kyōto between Tokyo and Shin-Ōsaka. On the San'yō Shinkansen, all trains stop at Shin-Kōbe, Okayama, Hiroshima, and Kokura plus at least one random intermediate stop between Shin-Ōsaka and Hakata.

Foreign tourists traveling with a Japan Rail Pass are required to purchase a special ticket to use the Nozomi service.

== History ==
=== Wartime steam services ===
The Nozomi name was first used for long-distance express services operated between Busan in Japanese-occupied Korea and Mukden (now Shenyang) in the former Manchukuo (now China) from 1934. From 1938, the services were extended to run between Busan and Xinjing (now Changchun) in Manchukuo. The 1,530 km (950 mi) journey from Busan to Xinjing took over 29 hours, with an average speed of 52 km/h (32 mph). The services were run down between 1943 and 1944.

=== Shinkansen services ===
Nozomi shinkansen services commenced on March 14, 1992, using new 300 series trainsets with a top speed of 270 km/h (170 mph). From March 1997, 500 series trainsets were introduced on Tokyo - Hakata Nozomi services, running at a maximum speed of 300 km/h (190 mph) and covering the section between Shin-Osaka and Hakata in 2 hours 17 minutes.

700 series trains were introduced on Nozomi services in 1999, and N700 series trains were introduced from July 1, 2007, initially with four daily round-trip runs. All regularly scheduled through Nozomi services to the San'yō Shinkansen (Tokyo–Hakata) were operated by N700 series sets from 13 March 2010. From the start of the revised timetable on 17 March 2012, all regularly scheduled Nozomi services, including runs limited to the Tokaido Shinkansen, were operated by N700 series sets.

With effect December 2023, JR Central and JR West adjusted all Nozomi services to operate with only reserved seats during three seasons that experience the highest ridership: New Years and Christmas (late December through the first week of January), Golden Week (29 April to 5 May), and the Obon festival (mid to late August). These adjustments were made in a bid to increase seat patronage and reduce the amount of standing passengers. From the start of the revised timetable on 15 March 2025, Nozomi services began to operate with only two non-reserved seating cars instead of three outside of peak periods, with officials citing an increase in the popularity of online train reservations.

== Stopping pattern ==
Legend

●	All trains stop
▲	Some trains stop
△	Few trains stop

Only basic Nozomi stopping patterns are shown. Additional Nozomi trains with differing stopping patterns are added during holiday and high-peak travel periods and are not included in this table. Some trains begin/terminate at Nagoya, Shin-Osaka, Nishi-Akashi, Himeji, Okayama, or Hiroshima.

Station	Distance from Tōkyō km (mi)	Stops
Tōkyō	0 (0)	●
Shinagawa	6.8 (4.2)	●
Shin-Yokohama	25.5 (15.8)	●
Nagoya	342.0 (212.5)	●
Kyoto	476.3 (296.0)	●
Shin-Ōsaka	515.4 (320.3)	●
Shin-Kōbe	548.0 (340.5)	●
Nishi-Akashi	570.2 (354.3)	△
Himeji	601.3 (373.6)	▲
Okayama	676.3 (420.2)	●
Fukuyama	733.1 (455.5)	▲
Hiroshima	821.2 (510.3)	●
Tokuyama	903.5 (561.4)	△
Shin-Yamaguchi	944.6 (586.9)	▲
Kokura	1,013.2 (629.6)	●
Hakata	1,069.1 (664.3)	●

== Rolling stock ==
=== Current rolling stock ===
- N700A series (July 2007 – present)
- N700S series (July 2020 – present)
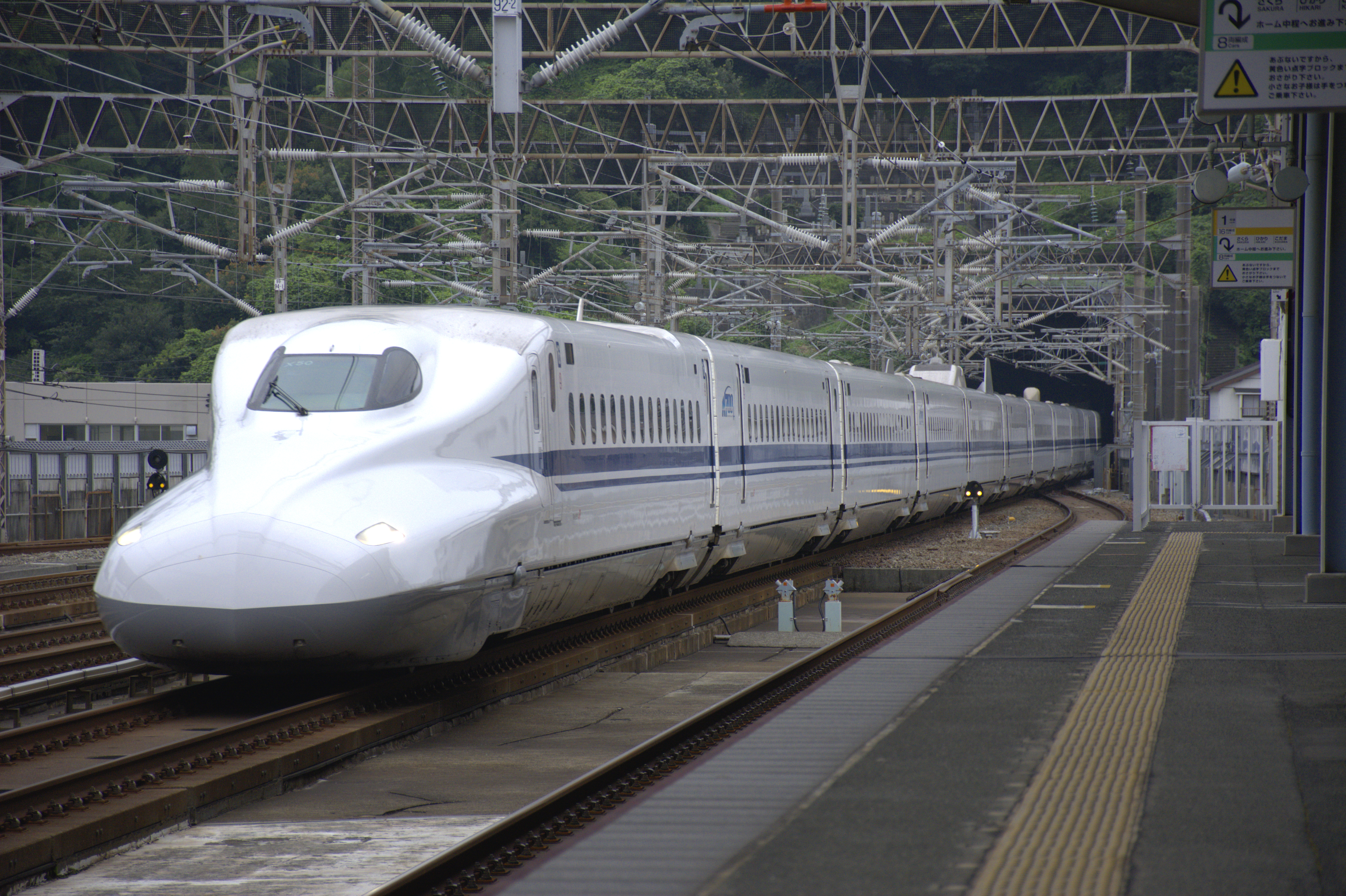
N700A series, September 2014

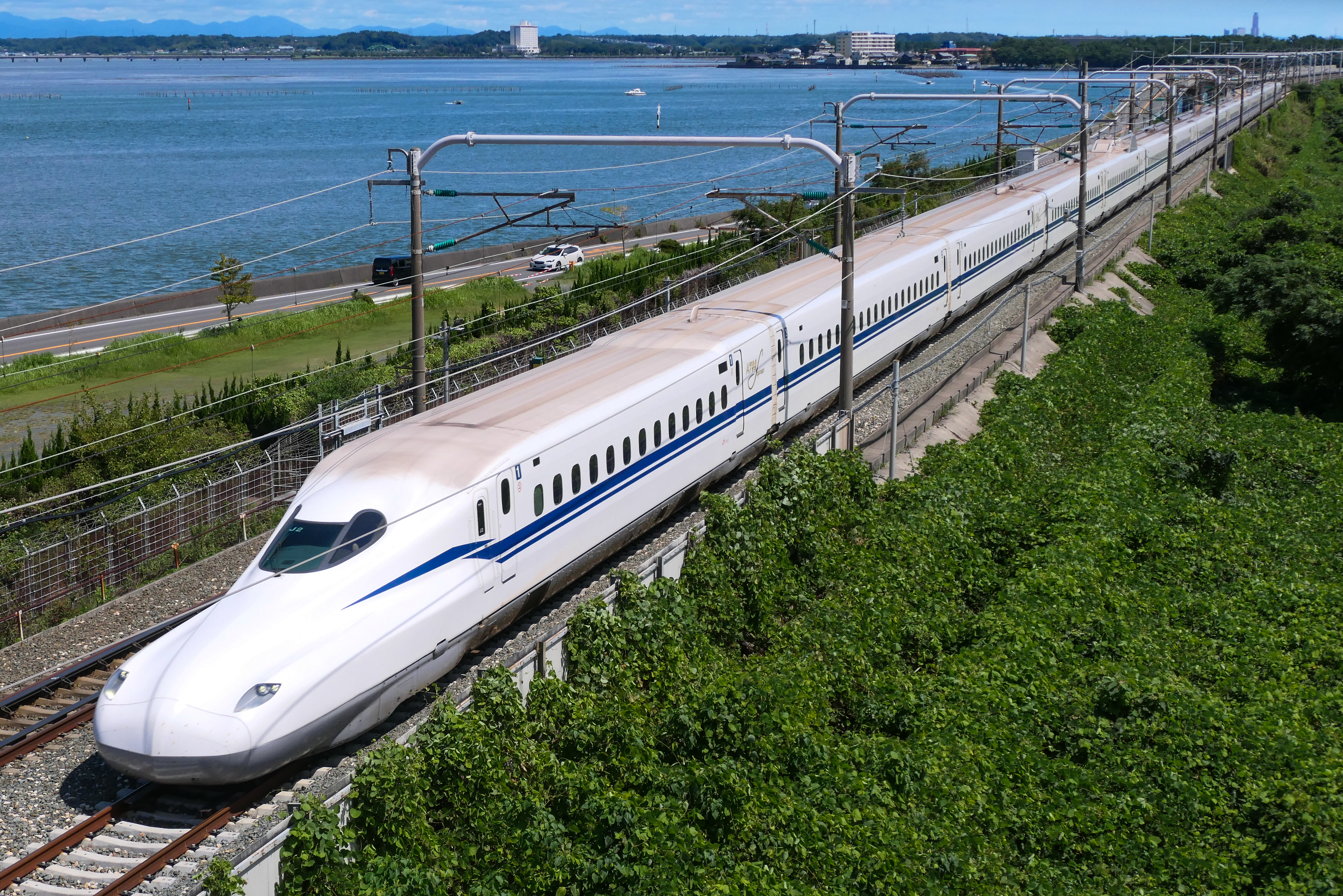
N700S series, September 2021

=== Former rolling stock ===
- 300 series (March 1992 – March 2012)
- 500 series (March 1997 – February 2010)
- 700 series (March 1999 – March 2020)
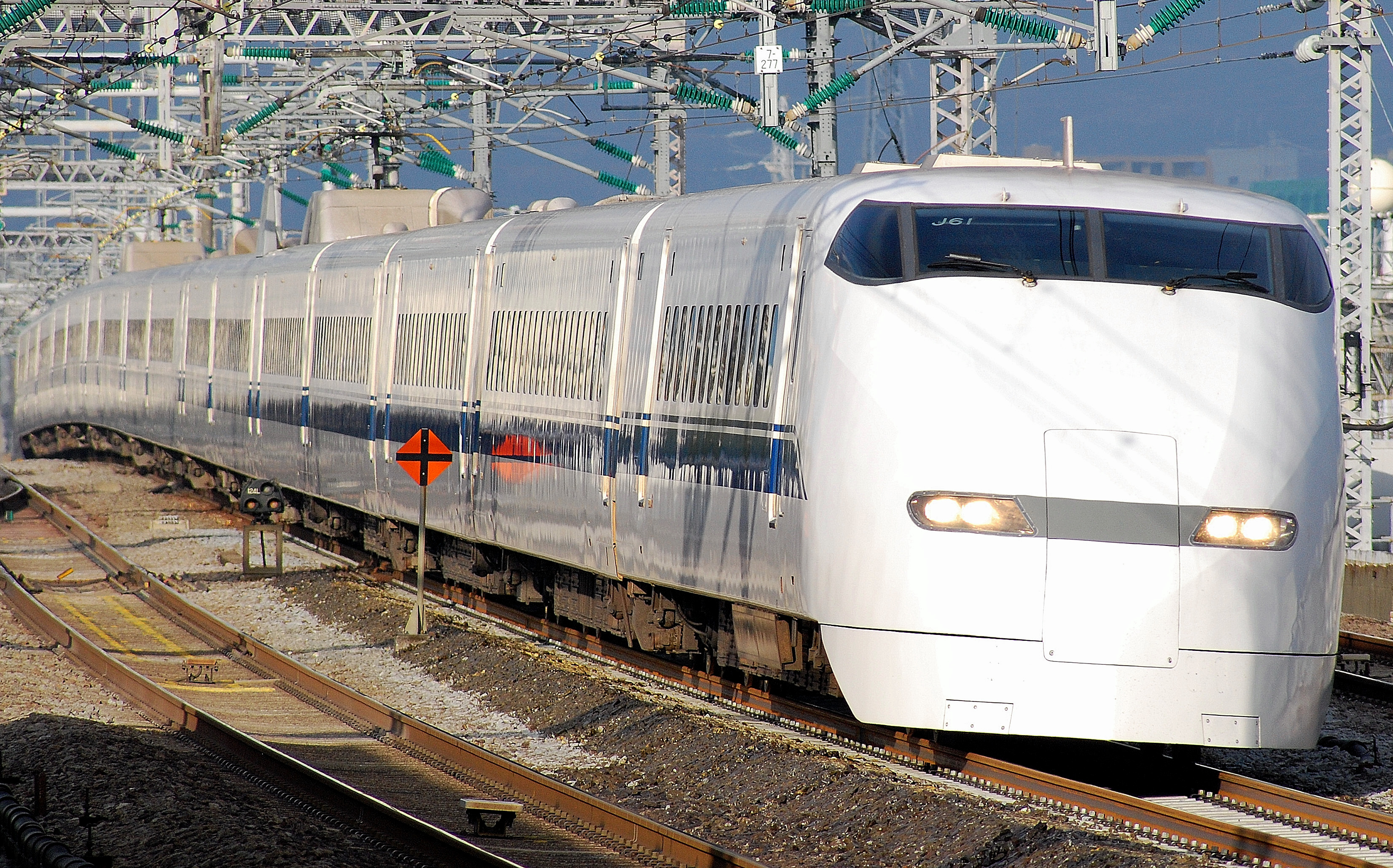
300 series, February 2011

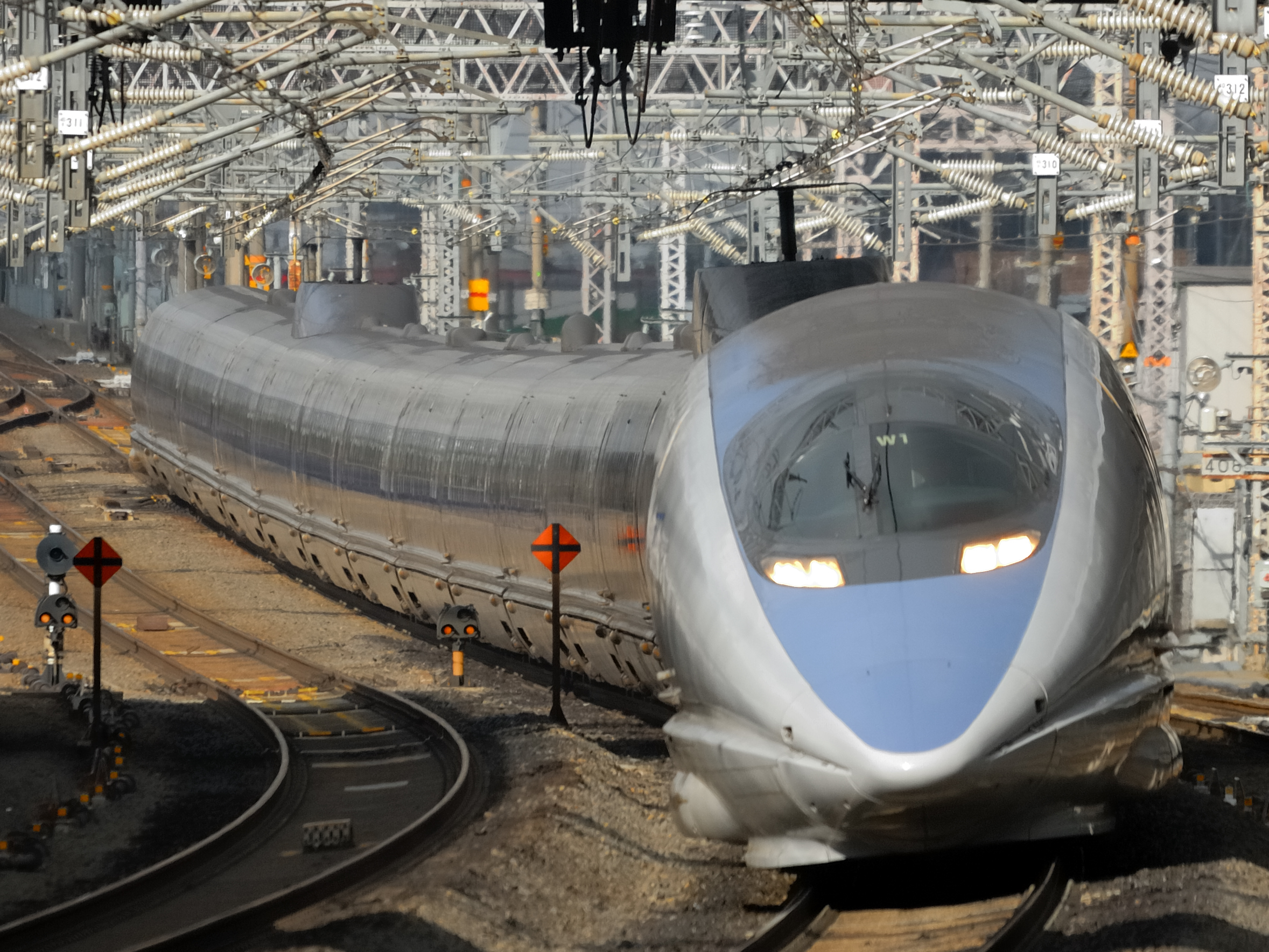
500 series in February 2010

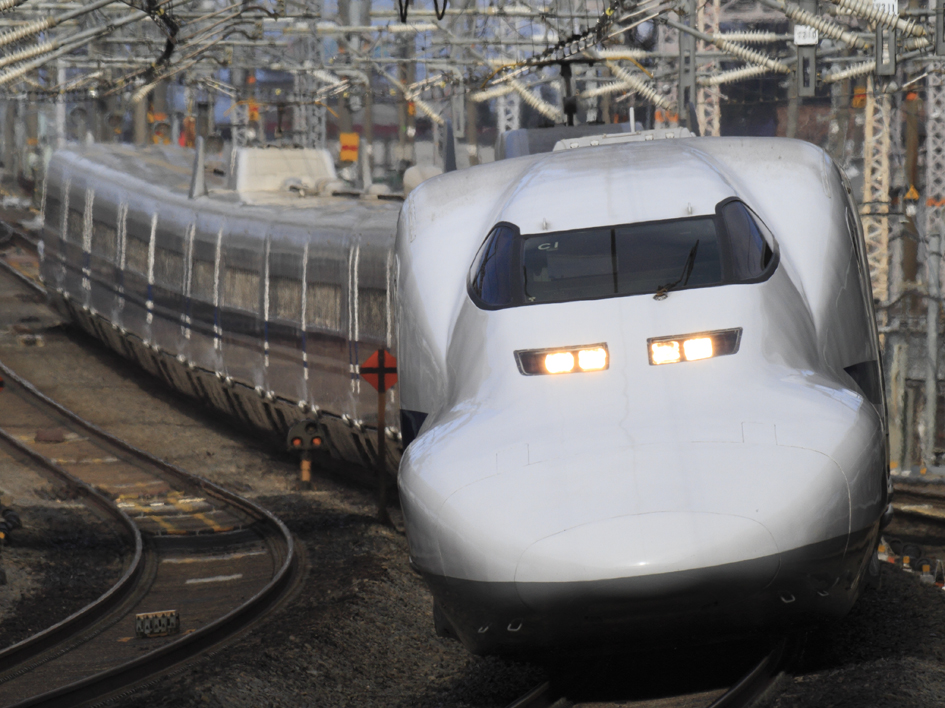
700 series in January 2010

== Formations ==
=== Current operations ===
As of March 2025, trains are formed as shown below, with car 1 at the Hakata end, and car 16 at the Tokyo end. All seats are non-smoking.

Car no.	1	2	3	4	5	6	7	8	9	10	11	12	13	14	15	16
Class	Ordinary non-reserved		Ordinary reserved				S Work reserved	Green reserved			Ordinary reserved					
Facilities	Toilet		Toilet		Toilet		Toilet	Conductor's office	Toilet		Toilet, wheelchair space, multi-purpose room		Toilet		Toilet	

On N700A trains, power outlets are located at the window seats and car end seats on standard cars, and at each seat in Green cars. On N700S trains, power outlets are located at each seat.

The seventh car is designated as the S Work (Shinkansen Work) car, which is intended for business travelers. Unlike standard cars, where a quiet, library-like atmosphere is encouraged, the S Work car permits phone calls, video conferences, and laptop use. Passengers are asked to refrain from chatting with strangers in order to maintain a work-focused environment. Seats recline less than in other cars to provide additional usable tray-table space. Some seats are designated S Work P (Premium), in which the tray tables are angled toward the passenger to improve comfort when using a laptop and the middle seat is blocked, providing additional personal space, a privacy partition, and a beverage holder, as the angled tray tables are not suitable for holding drinks. The S Work car also offers WiFi that is faster, more secure and has no time limits.

In 2021, payphones were removed from cars 4, 9, 15 (previously present on N700A trains only) and car 12 (previously present on all trains). In March 2024, smoking rooms in cars 3, 7, 10, and 15 were deactivated on trains.

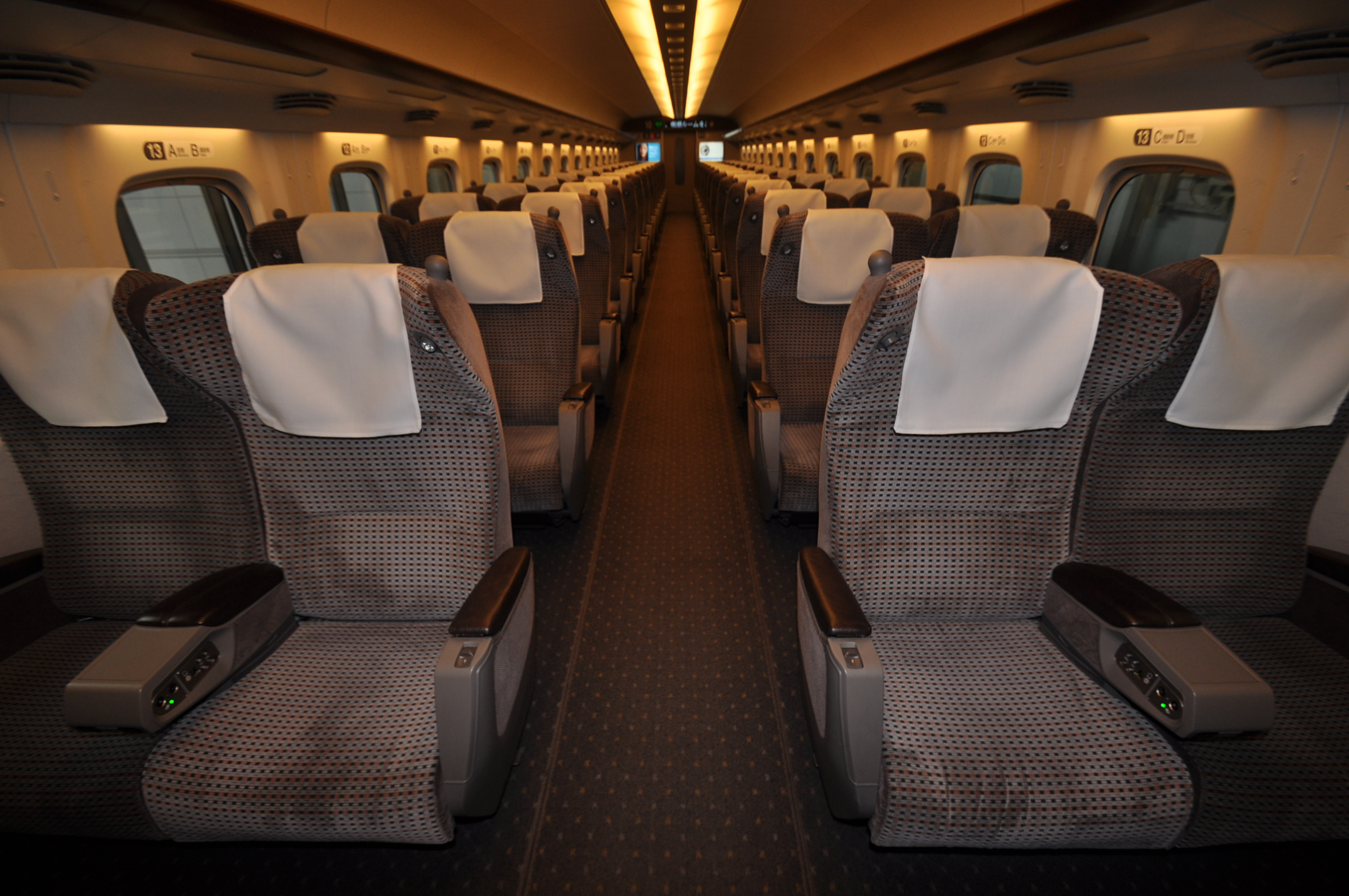
N700A series Green car interior

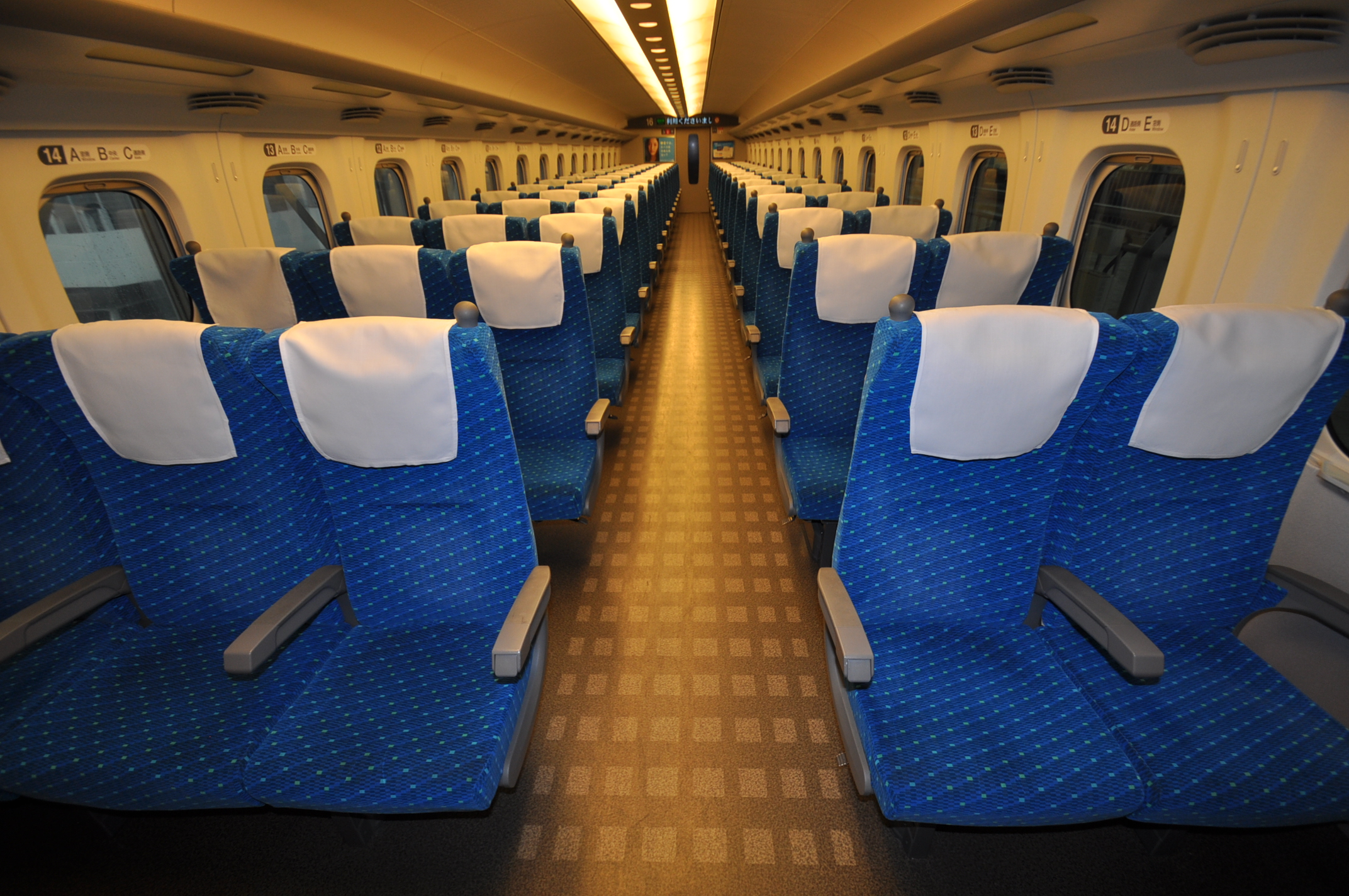
N700A series ordinary car interior

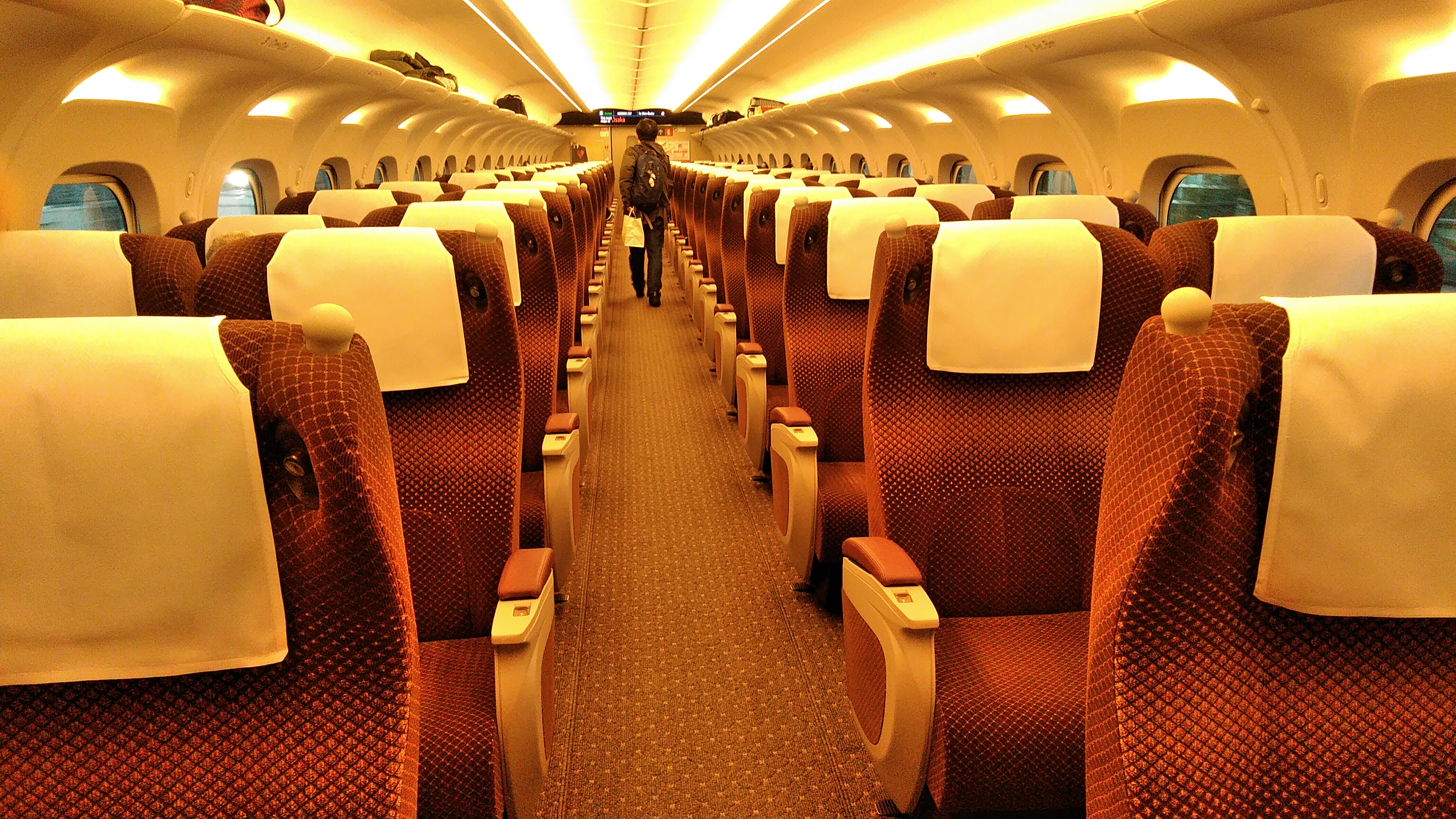
N700S series Green car interior

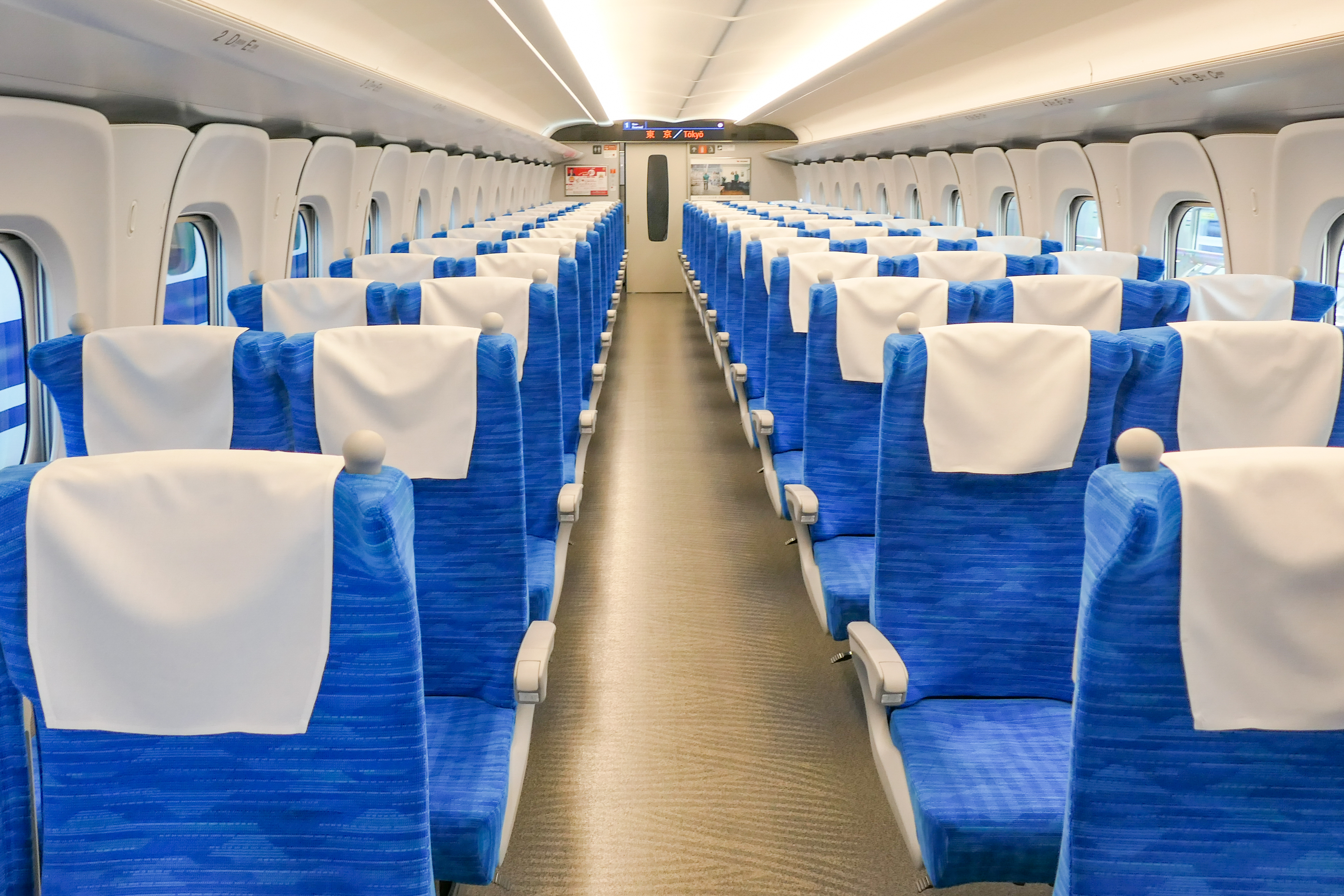
N700S series ordinary car interior

== See also ==
- List of named passenger trains of Japan
