= Index of Japan-related articles (H) =

This page lists Japan-related articles with romanized titles beginning with the letter H. For names of people, please list by surname (i.e., "Tarō Yamada" should be listed under "Y", not "T"). Please also ignore particles (e.g. "a", "an", "the") when listing articles (i.e., "A City with No People" should be listed under "City").

== H ==
- H-II
- H-IIA
- H-IIB
- H-II Transfer Vehicle
- H2 (manga)
- H3 (rocket)

== Ha ==
- Habikino, Osaka
- Habu
- Hachikai, Aichi
- Hachiman
- Hachinohe, Aomori
- Hachinohe Station
- Hachiōji, Tokyo
- Hadano, Kanagawa
- Haebaru, Okinawa
- Haga, Hyogo
- Hagakure
- Hagi, Yamaguchi
- Sakutarō Hagiwara
- Hagoromo Gakuen Junior College
- Haguri District, Aichi
- Haibane Renmei
- Haibara District, Shizuoka
- Haibara, Nara
- Haibara, Shizuoka
- Haibun
- Haibutsu kishaku
- Haiga
- Haikai
- Haiku
- Hajime Sorayama
- Chitose Hajime
- Hakata Minami Line
- Hakata ningyō
- Hakata no mori stadium
- Hakata Station
- Hakata Port Tower
- Hakata-ku, Fukuoka
- Hakata-Ohshima Bridge
- Hakata, Ehime
- Haki, Fukuoka
- Hakko Ryu
- Hakodate Airport
- Hakodate, Hokkaidō
- Hakone, Kanagawa
- Hakone Tozan Line
- Haku
- Hakui, Ishikawa
- Hakuin Ekaku
- Hakusan, Mie
- Hakusui, Kumamoto
- Hakuta, Shimane
- Hakuun Yasutani
- Halfbreed Saiyan
- Chisaki Hama
- Hamada, Shimane
- Hamaguchi Osachi
- Hamaguri rebellion
- Hamakita, Shizuoka
- Hamamatsu, Shizuoka
- Hamamatsuchō Station
- Hamana District, Shizuoka
- Hamasaka, Hyogo
- Ayumi Hamasaki
- Hamatama, Saga
- Masashi Hamauzu
- Hamtaro
- Hamura, Tokyo
- Han (country subdivision)
- Keiko Han
- Han unification
- Hana Ichi Momme
- Hana yori Dango
- Hanabiramochi
- Hanafuda
- Hanamaki, Iwate
- Hanami
- Hanazakari no Kimitachi E
- Hanazono
- Hanazono, Wakayama
- Hanbō
- Handa, Aichi
- Handa, Tokushima
- Hankyū Kōbe Line
- Hankyu Kyoto Line
- Hankyu Railway
- Hannan
- Hanno, Saitama
- Hanoura, Tokushima
- Hanshin Electric Railway
- Hanshin Tigers
- Hanwa Line
- Hanyū, Saitama
- Yuzuru Hanyuda
- Hanzan, Kagawa
- Hara Takashi
- Hara Tamiki
- Hara Tanzan
- Masato Harada
- Hamajima, Mie
- Harajuku
- Harajuku Station
- Haramachi, Fukushima
- Hiroshi Harashima
- Harem anime
- Harima Province
- Harima, Hyogo
- Harry Parkes
- Haruhi, Aichi
- Haruka Teno
- Haruno, Kochi
- Haruno, Shizuoka
- Hasama, Ōita
- Hase-dera
- Hase-dera (Kamakura)
- T. Hasegawa
- Hasegawa Tōhaku
- Hashima
- Hashima, Gifu,
- Hashima District, Gifu
- Hashima Island
- Hashimoto Gahō
- Ryutaro Hashimoto
- Hashimoto Shinkichi
- Hashimoto, Wakayama
- Hasuda, Saitama
- Hasumi, Shimane
- Hata District, Kochi
- Tsutomu Hata
- Hatamoto
- Hatasho, Shiga
- Hatogaya, Saitama
- Ichirō Hatoyama
- Hatsukaichi, Hiroshima
- Masaaki Hatsumi
- Hatto, Tottori
- Katsura Hattori
- Hawai, Tottori
- Hayabusa
- Yoshiki Hayama
- Hayama, Kochi
- Hayami District, Ōita
- Hayami Yuji
- Miki Hayasaka
- Hayashi Senjuro
- Megumi Hayashibara
- Hayashima, Okayama
- Hayato, Kagoshima
- Hazu District, Aichi
- Hazu, Aichi

== He ==
- Heda, Shizuoka
- Heguri, Nara
- Heian period
- Heiji Rebellion
- Heisei
- Heiwa, Aichi
- Heki, Yamaguchi
- Hekiganroku
- Hekinan, Aichi
- Hello Kitty
- Hellsing
- Henohenomoheji
- Hentai
- Hentai games
- Hepburn romanization

== Hi ==
- Hiba District, Hiroshima
- Hibakujumoku
- Hibari Misora
- Hida Mountains
- Hida Province
- Hida, Gifu
- Hidaka District, Wakayama
- Hidaka Subprefecture
- Hidaka, Hyōgo
- Hidaka, Kōchi
- Hidaka, Saitama
- Hidaka, Wakayama
- Ken Hidaka
- The Hidden Fortress
- Hiezu, Tottori
- Higan
- Higanjima
- Higashi, Okinawa
- Higashi-ku, Fukuoka
- Higashi-ku, Hamamatsu
- Higashi-ku, Hiroshima
- Higashi-ku, Nagoya
- Higashi-ku, Niigata
- Higashi-ku, Okayama
- Higashi-ku, Sakai
- Higashi-ku, Sapporo
- Higashi-yamato, Tokyo
- Higashiawakura, Okayama
- Higashiazai District, Shiga
- Higashihiroshima, Hiroshima
- Higashiichiki, Kagoshima
- Higashiiyayama, Tokushima
- Higashiizu, Shizuoka
- Higashiizumo, Shimane
- Higashikagawa, Kagawa
- Higashikamo District, Aichi
- Higashikunisaki District, Ōita
- Higashikurume, Tokyo
- Higashikushira, Kagoshima
- Higashimatsuura District, Saga
- Higashimatsuyama, Saitama
- Higashimorokata District, Miyazaki
- Higashimurayama, Tokyo
- Higashi Nakatsukasa
- Higashine, Yamagata
- Higashimuro District, Wakayama
- Higashiosaka, Osaka
- Higashisefuri, Saga
- Higashishirakawa, Gifu
- Higashitsuno, Kochi
- Higashiura, Aichi
- Higashiura, Hyogo
- Higashiusuki District, Miyazaki
- Higashiuwa District, Ehime
- Higashiyama-ku, Kyoto
- Higashiyoka, Saga
- Higashiyama Kai'i
- Higashiyama period
- Higashiyoshino, Nara
- High School Girls
- Higo Province
- Higuchi Ichiyō
- Susana Higuchi

== Hi (cont'd) ==
- Hiji, Ōita
- Hijikata Toshizō
- Hijikawa, Ehime
- Hikami District, Hyōgo
- Hikami, Hyogo
- Hikari (Shinkansen)
- Hikari, Yamaguchi
- Hikaru no Go
- Hikawa District, Shimane
- Hikawa, Shimane
- Hiki District, Saitama
- Hikigawa, Wakayama
- Hikikomori
- Hikimi, Shimane
- Hikitsuke
- Hikone, Shiga
- HI-LEX
- Himedo, Kumamoto
- Himeji, Hyōgo
- Himeji Castle
- Himeshima, Ōita
- Himi, Toyama
- Himiko (queen)
- Hinamatsuri
- Hinase, Okayama
- Hino
- Hino, Shiga
- Hino, Tottori
- Hino District, Tottori
- Rei Hino
- Hinokage, Miyazaki
- Hioki District, Kagoshima
- Hirado Island
- Hirado, Nagasaki
- Hiraide Shū
- Hiraga Gennai
- Hiragana
- Hirakata, Osaka
- Hiranuma Kiichirō
- Hirao, Yamaguchi
- Hirara, Okinawa
- Hirata, Gifu
- Hirata, Shimane
- Hiratsuka, Kanagawa
- Hideyuki Hirayama
- Hirogawa, Wakayama
- Hirohito
- Hirokawa, Fukuoka
- Hiromi
- Heisuke Hironaka
- Hirose, Shimane
- Hiroshige
- Hiroshima Peace Memorial
- Hiroshima Prefecture
- Hiroshima, Hiroshima
- Ryōko Hirosue
- Kōki Hirota
- Hirota, Ehime
- Hirukawa, Gifu
- His and Her Circumstances
- Hisai, Mie
- Hisayama, Fukuoka
- Hishikari, Kagoshima
- Historic Monuments of Ancient Nara
- History of anime
- Historical tale
- History of Japan
- History of Okinawa
- Hita, Ōita
- Hitachi Hatsukaze
- Hitachi, Ltd.
- Hitachi Province
- Hitachi, Ibaraki
- Hitachi 917
- Hitachinaka, Ibaraki
- Hitachiōta, Ibaraki
- Hitokiri
- Yo Hitoto
- Hitotsume-kozō
- Hitoyoshi, Kumamoto
- Hirosaki, Aomori
- Hiyama Subprefecture
- Hiyayakko
- Hiyoshi, Kagoshima
- Hiyoshi, Kyoto
- Hiwa, Hiroshima
- Hiwasa, Tokushima
- Hizen Province
- Hizen, Saga

== Ho ==
- Hofu, Yamaguchi
- Hōgen Rebellion
- Hohoku, Yamaguchi
- Hoi District, Aichi
- Hōjō clan
- Hōjō Masako
- Hōjō Tokimune
- Hōjō Tokiuji
- Hōjō Tokiyori
- Hōjō Yasutoki
- Hōjō, Fukuoka
- Hōjō, Tottori
- Hojojutsu
- Hoki Province
- Hokkaidō
- Hokkaido (dog)
- Hokkaido Air System
- Hokkaido Bank
- Hokkaido Broadcasting
- Hokkaido International Airlines
- Hokkaido Nippon Ham Fighters
- Hokkaido Prefectural Board of Education
- Hokkaido Prefectural Sports Center
- Hokkaido Railway Company
- Hokkaido Shimbun
- Hokkaidō Shinkansen
- Hokkaido Takushoku Bank
- Hokkaido University
- Hokkaido University of Education
- Hokkaido Utari Association
- Hokkaido wolf
- Hokku
- Hokubo, Okayama
- Hokudan, Hyogo
- Hokuriku Main Line
- Hokuriku region
- Hokuriku Shinkansen
- Hokusai
- Hokuto, Yamanashi
- The Hollow Doll
- Homosexuality in Japan
- Masaharu Homma
- Honai, Ehime
- Honami, Fukuoka
- Honda
- Honda Accord
- Honda CB series
- Honda CB750
- Honda Civic
- Honda Civic CRX
- Honda Civic Hybrid
- Honda Element
- Honda Insight
- Honda Inspire
- Honda Integra
- Honda Ishiro
- Honda Jazz
- Honda Prelude
- Soichiro Honda
- Honda Toshiaki
- Honda-kai
- Hondo, Kumamoto
- Hōnen Shōnin
- Hongaku
- Hongan-ji
- Hongawa, Kochi
- Hongō
- Hongo, Hiroshima
- Hongo, Yamaguchi
- Hongu, Wakayama
- Honinbo Sansa
- Honinbo Shusaku
- Honji suijaku
- Honjō, Nagano
- Honjō, Akita
- Honjo, Ōita
- Honjo, Saitama
- Honkawane, Shizuoka
- Honne and tatemae
- Honshū
- Honshū-Shikoku Bridge Project
- Honyabakei, Ōita
- Honzon
- Horado, Gifu
- Horai, Aichi
- Hōrai-ji
- Kenichi Horie
- Mitsuko Horie
- Takafumi Horie
- Yui Horie
- Yuji Horii
- Horikawa
- Hōryū-ji
- Hoshi Sato
- Hoshino, Fukuoka
- Yukinobu Hoshino
- Hoshuyama, Fukuoka
- Hosoe, Shizuoka
- Hosokawa clan
- Hosokawa Gracia
- Hosokawa Katsumoto
- Morihiro Hosokawa
- Haruomi Hosono
- Hotei
- Hototogisu
- Hototogisu (magazine)
- Hotsuma Tsutae
- Hotsumisaki-ji
- Houko Kuwashima
- House of Councillors
- House of Peers
- House of Representatives of Japan
- Howl's Moving Castle (film)
- Hoya, Tokyo

== Hu ==
- Hudson Soft
- Hugh Borton
- Hull note
- Hunter × Hunter

== Hy ==
- Yuji Hyakutake
- Hyōgo Prefecture
- Hyūga Province
- Hyūga, Miyazaki
- Hylian
- Hyoshigi
- Hyrule
- Hyrule Field
