= Aki Kokubunji =

Buddhist temple in Hiroshima Prefecture, Japan

Aki Kokubun-ji 安芸国分寺
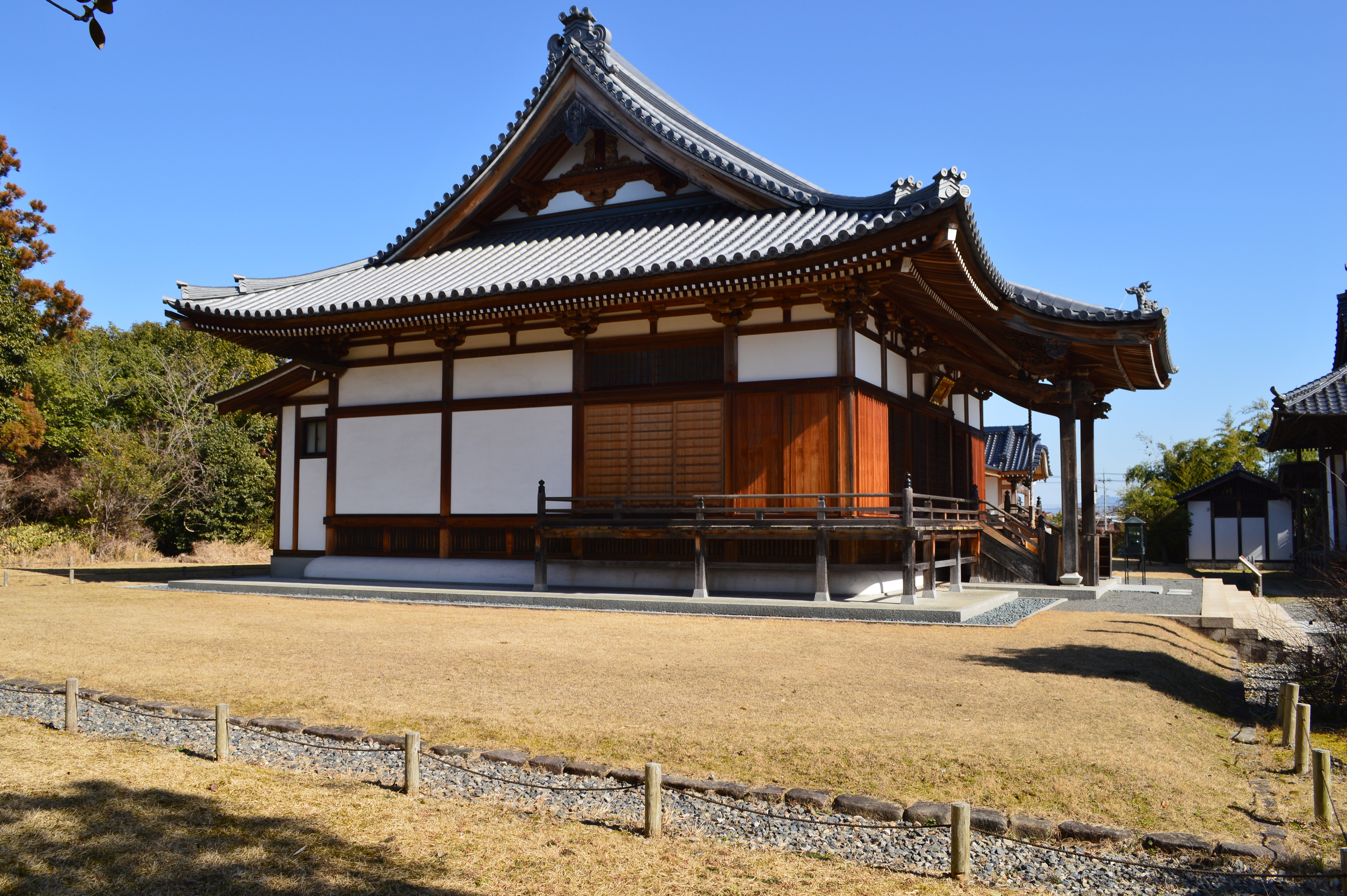
- Mino Kokubun-ji Hondō on base of Nara-period Kondō

- Aki Kokubun-ji Aki Kokubunji (Japan)

Religion
- Affiliation: Buddhist
- Deity: Yakushi Nyōrai
- Rite: Shingon

Location
- Location: 419 Aono-chō, Ōgaki-shi, Gifu-ken 503-2227
- Country: Japan
- Interactive map of Aki Kokubun-ji 安芸国分寺
- Coordinates: 34°26′3.25″N 132°44′55.50″E

Architecture
- Founder: Emperor Shōmu
- Completed: c.741

Website
- Official website

Aki Kokubun-ji (安芸国分寺) is an Omuro-school Shingon-sect Buddhist temple in the Yoshiyuki Saijomachi neighborhood of the city of Higashihiroshima, Hiroshima, Japan. It is one of the few surviving provincial temples established by Emperor Shōmu during the Nara period (710–794). Due to this connection, the foundation stones of the Nara period temple were designated as a National Historic Site in 1932, with the area under protection expanded in 1977, and again in 2002.

== History ==
The Shoku Nihongi records that in 741, as the country recovered from a major smallpox epidemic, Emperor Shōmu ordered that a monastery and nunnery be established in every province, the kokubunji (国分寺). These temples were built to a semi-standardized template, and served both to spread Buddhist orthodoxy to the provinces, and to emphasize the power of the Nara period centralized government under the Ritsuryō system.

The Aki Kokubun-ji is located on a terrace at the southern foot of Mount Ryūō on the north side of the Saijō Basin in central Hiroshima Prefecture. In the vicinity of the temple is the route of the ancient Sanyōdō highway which connected the Kinai region of Japan with Kyushu, as well as what is believed to be the site of the Nara period provincial capital and the Aki Kokubun-niji nunnery. The exact date of the temple's foundation is unknown; however, during archaeological excavations conducted from 1969 to 1971 and in 1977, a large amount of wooden tablets, Sue ware pottery and roof tiles were uncovered, some of which had dated inscriptions, the earliest of which was 750 AD. A Edo Period history states that the temple was founded by a son of the semi-legendary Emperor Yomei and was later converted to a kokubunji temple, but no archaeological evidence has yet been found to support this. The temple is listed in the Heian period Engishiki records dared 927 AD. Temple legend states that it the temple was burned down by Minamoto no Noriyori in the Genpei War when soldiers from the Heike clan barricaded themselves within: however, the temple's own "Kokugun Shigechoshōshō" records dated 1283 make no mention of such an incident. Archaeological evidence in this case confirms that the Pagoda was destroyed by a fire and that the temple buildings were reconstructed in the middle of the Heian period. During the Muromachi period, the temple was supported by local feudal lords, such as the Ouchi clan and Mōri clan. However, with the establishment of the Tokugawa shogunate, the temple estates were seized, and only a nominal amount was allotted by Hiroshima Domain for its upkeep. By the Hōei era (1704–1711), the temple was in serious decline. A fire in 1759 destroyed all structures except for the Niōmon gate, including all of the honzon Yakushi Nyorai statue except for its head. The surviving temple bell was subsequently relocated to the temple of Shōfuku-ji in the Jike neighborhood of Highashihiroshima.

The main hall of the current temple was rebuilt in 2004. The principal image, the Yakushi Nyorai seated statue, is designated as an important cultural property by Higashihiroshima City. The Goma-do, located in front of the main hall and facing west, was built in the latter half of the 18th century to the beginning of the 19th century in the late Edo period. It was constructed by the Asano clan, daimyō of Hiroshima Domain and is also designated as an important cultural property of Higashihiroshima. The Niōmon Gate on the south side of the temple grounds was built in 1547 during the Muromachi period. It is also designated as an important cultural property by Higashihiroshima.

The ruins of the Nara period temple overlap with the layout of the existing temple, and the current Main Hall is roughly on the cite of the original Kondō of the temple. The distance between the east and west walls of the temple compound has been determined to have been about 255 meters. The north and south boundaries have yet to be discovered. Currently, the site is open to the public as Aki Kokubunji Historical Park. It is about seven minutes on foot from Saijō Station on the JR West San'yō Main Line.

== Gallery ==
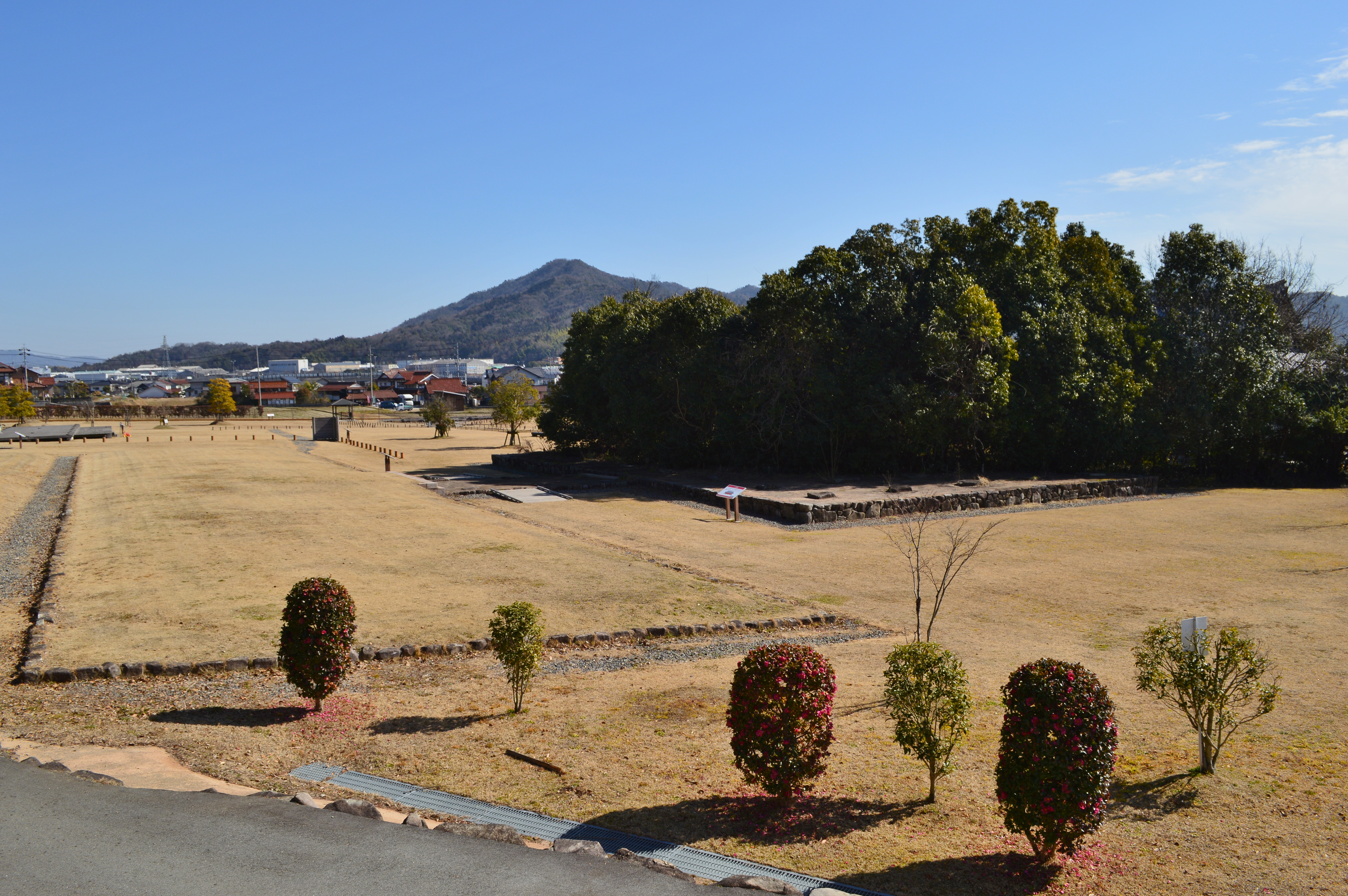
Precincts

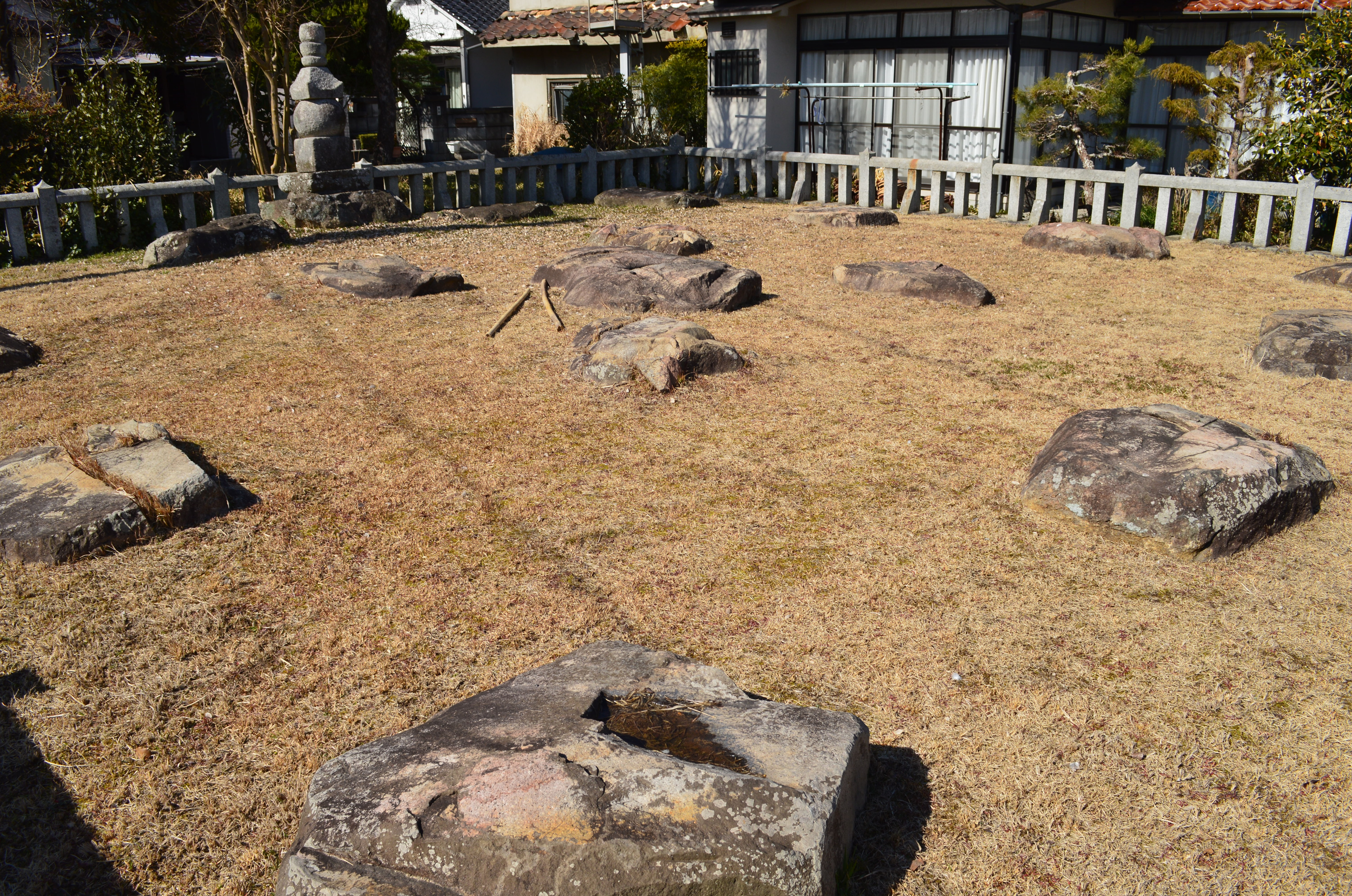
Foundations of Pagoda

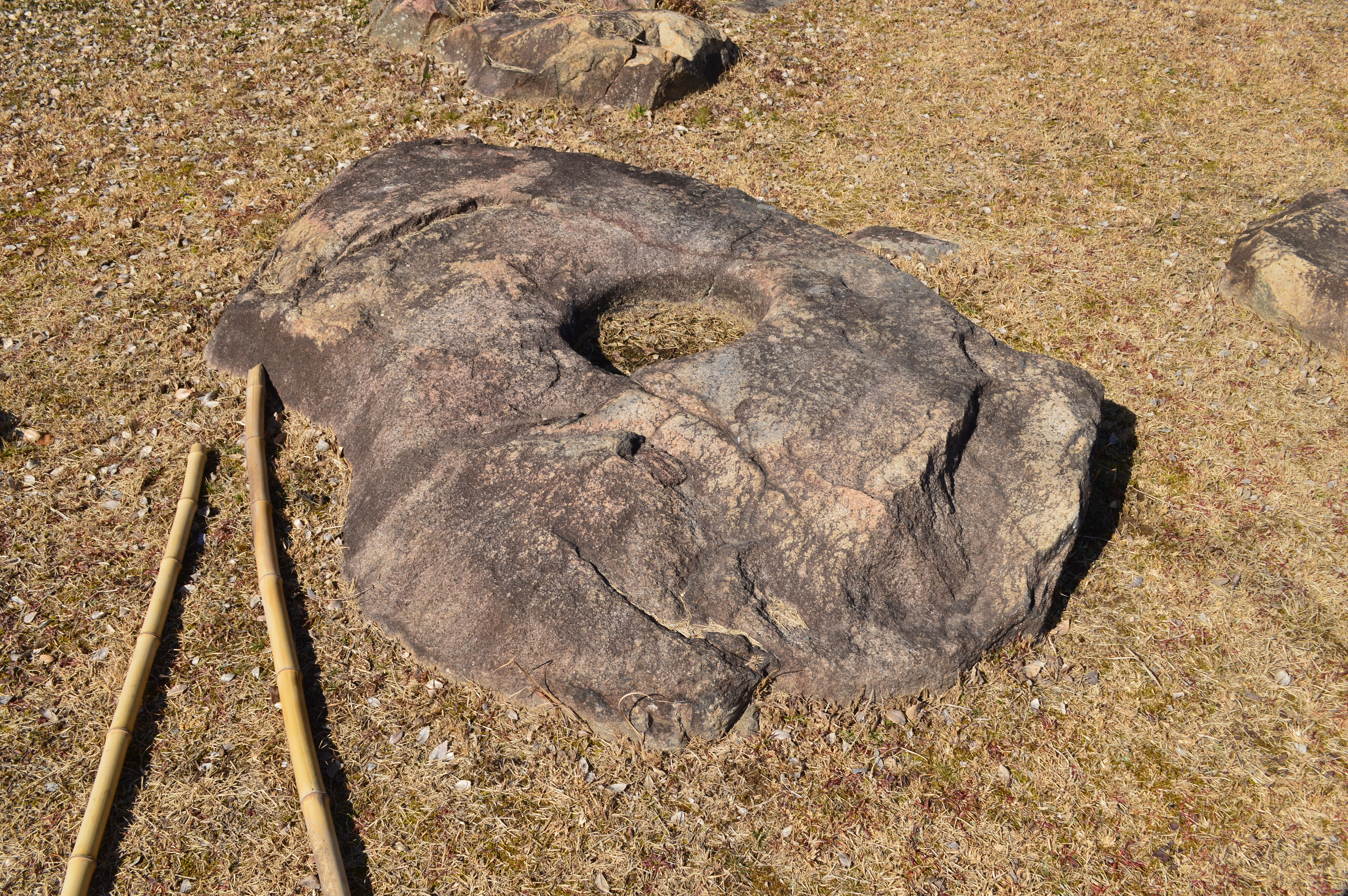
Foundation of central Pillar of Pagoda

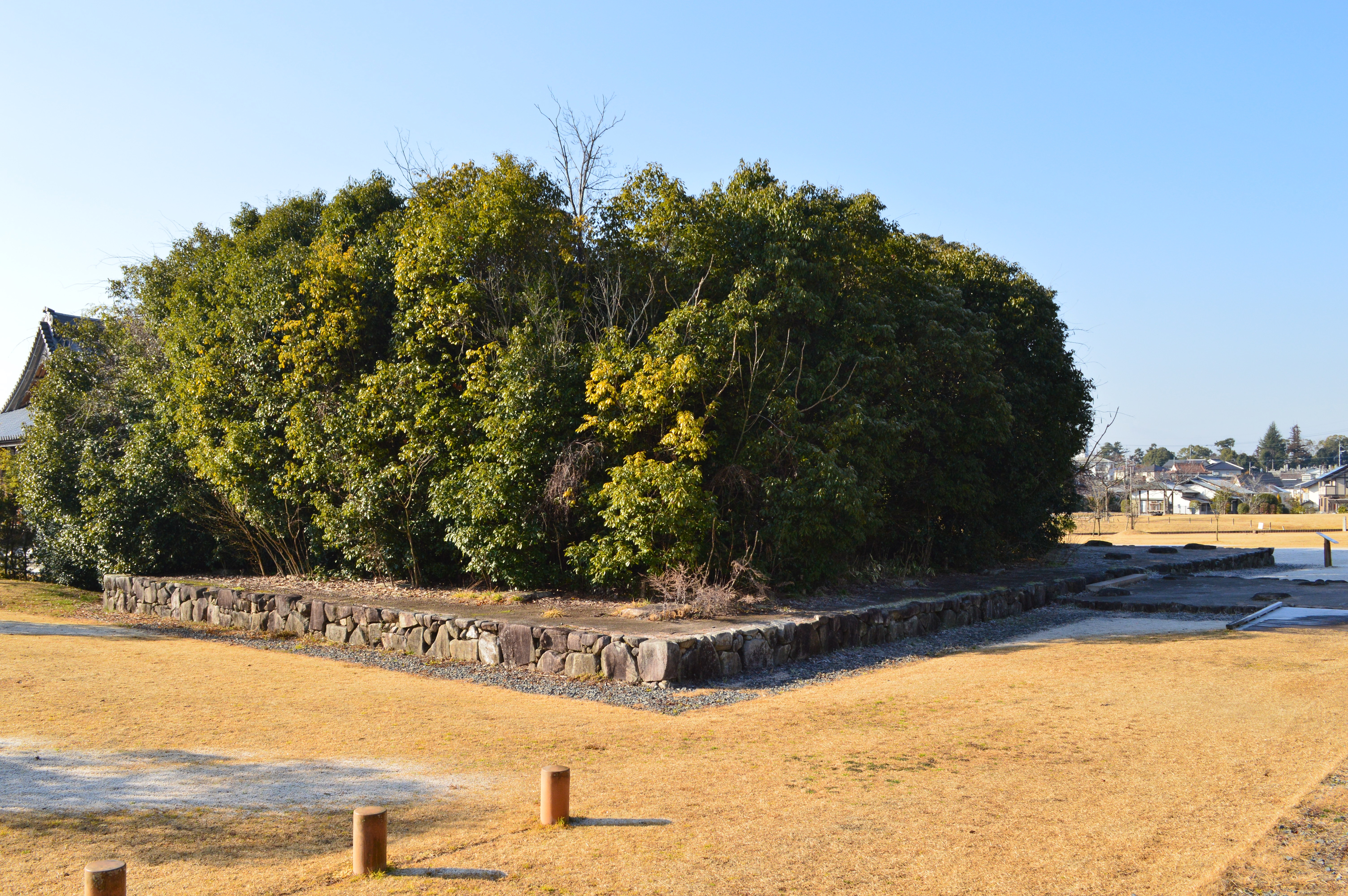
Foundation Lecture Hall

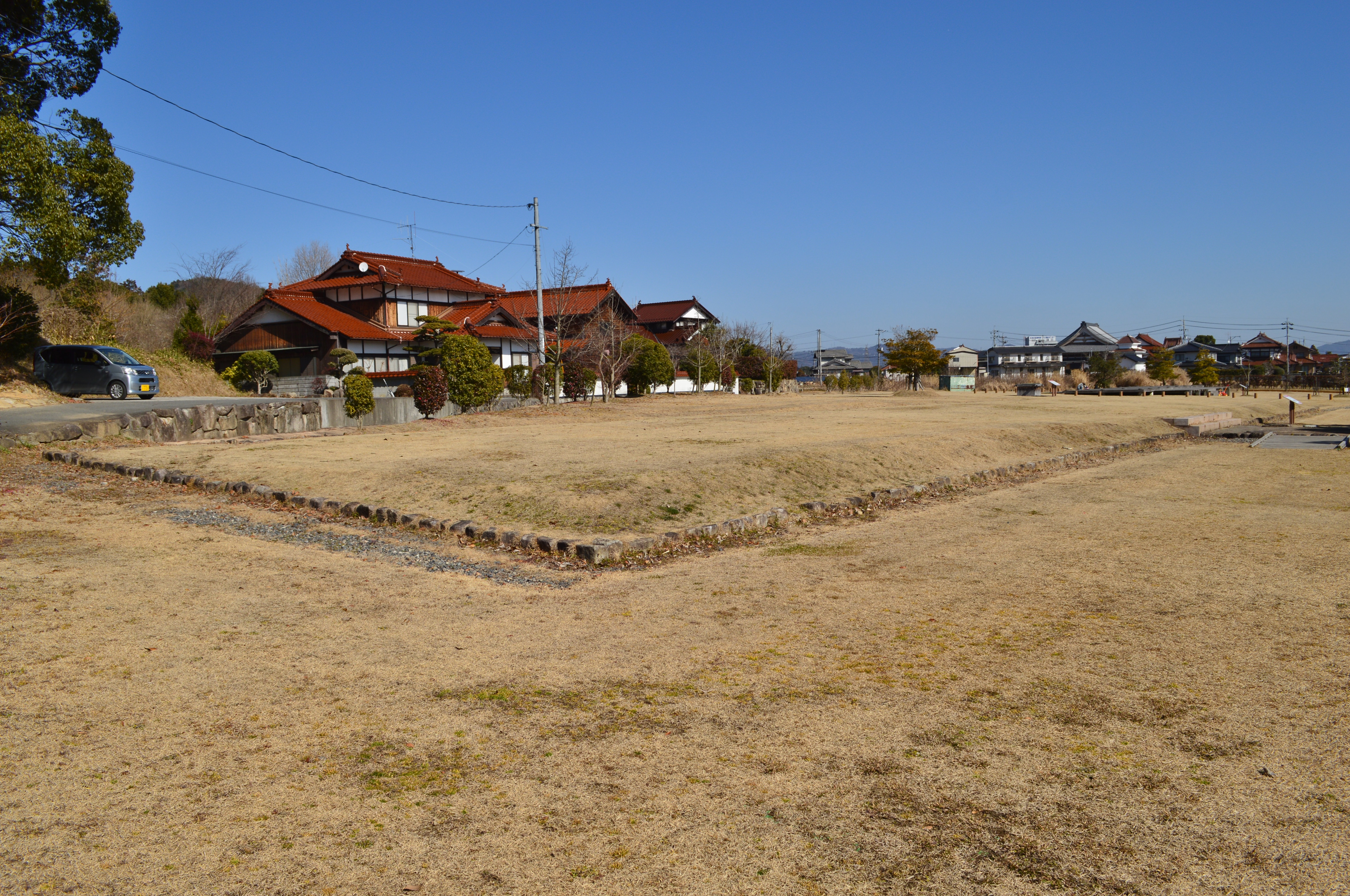
Foundations of Monk's quarters

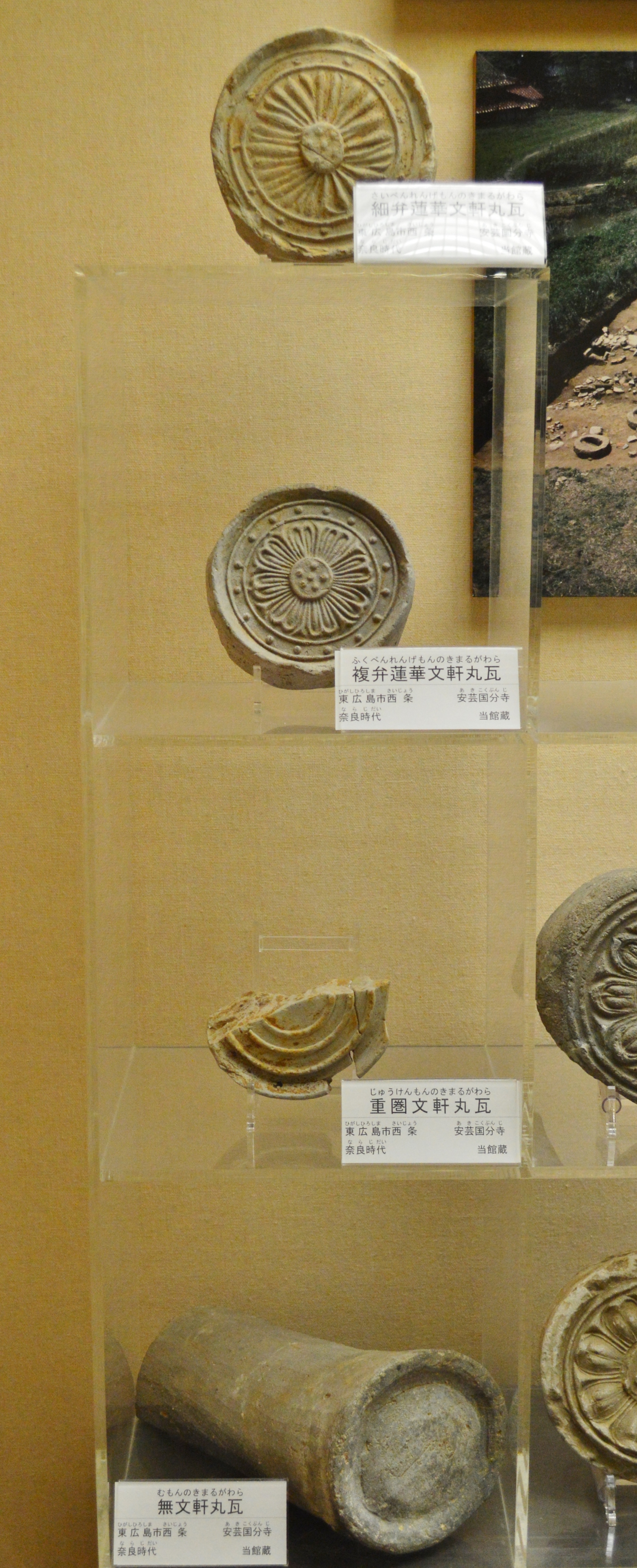
Roof tiles found at Aki Kokubun-ji ruins

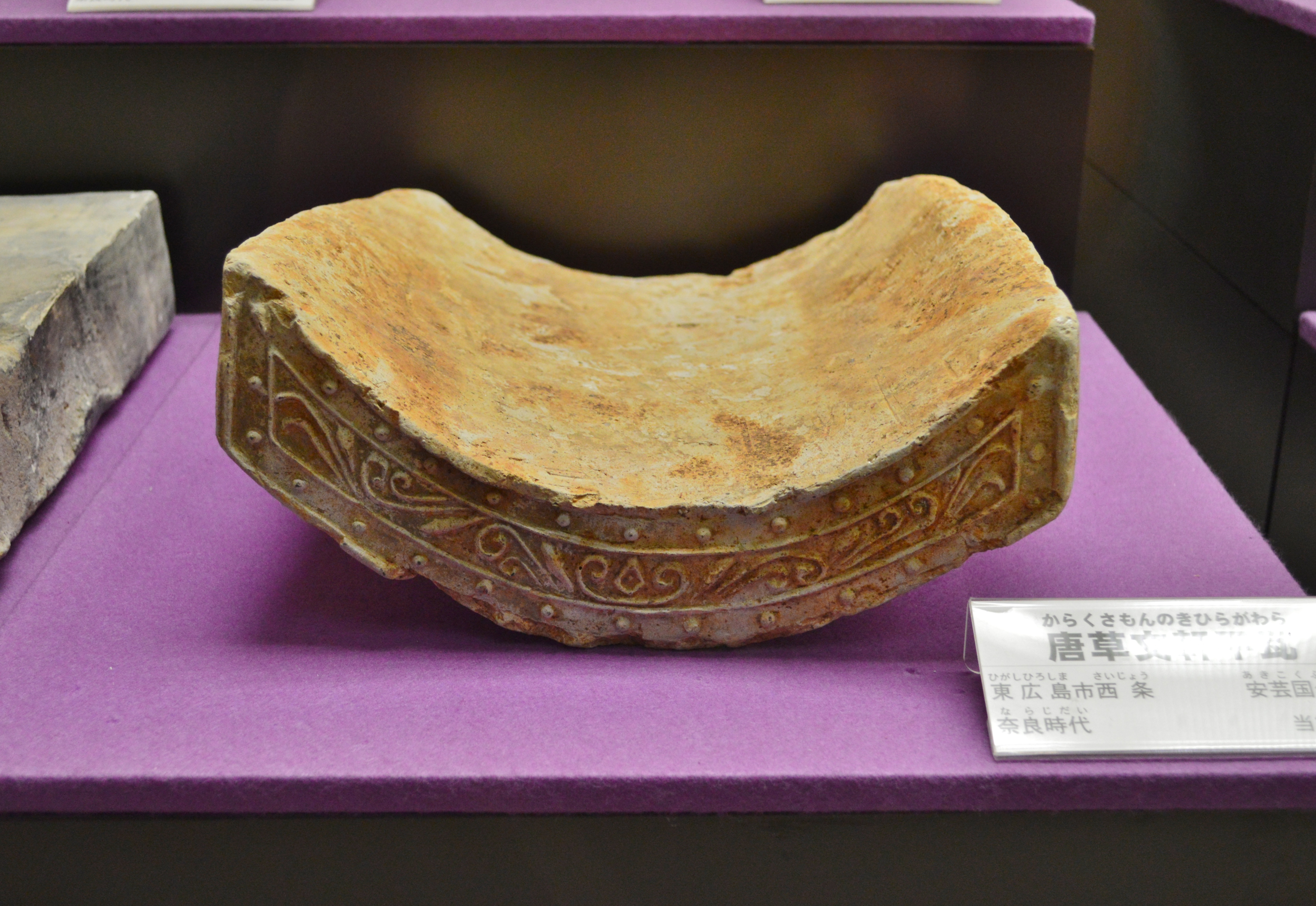
Roof tiles found at Aki Kokubun-ji ruins

== See also ==
- List of Historic Sites of Japan (Hiroshima)
- Provincial temple
