= Nyūno Station =

Railway station in Higashihiroshima, Hiroshima Prefecture, Japan

Nyūno Station 入野駅
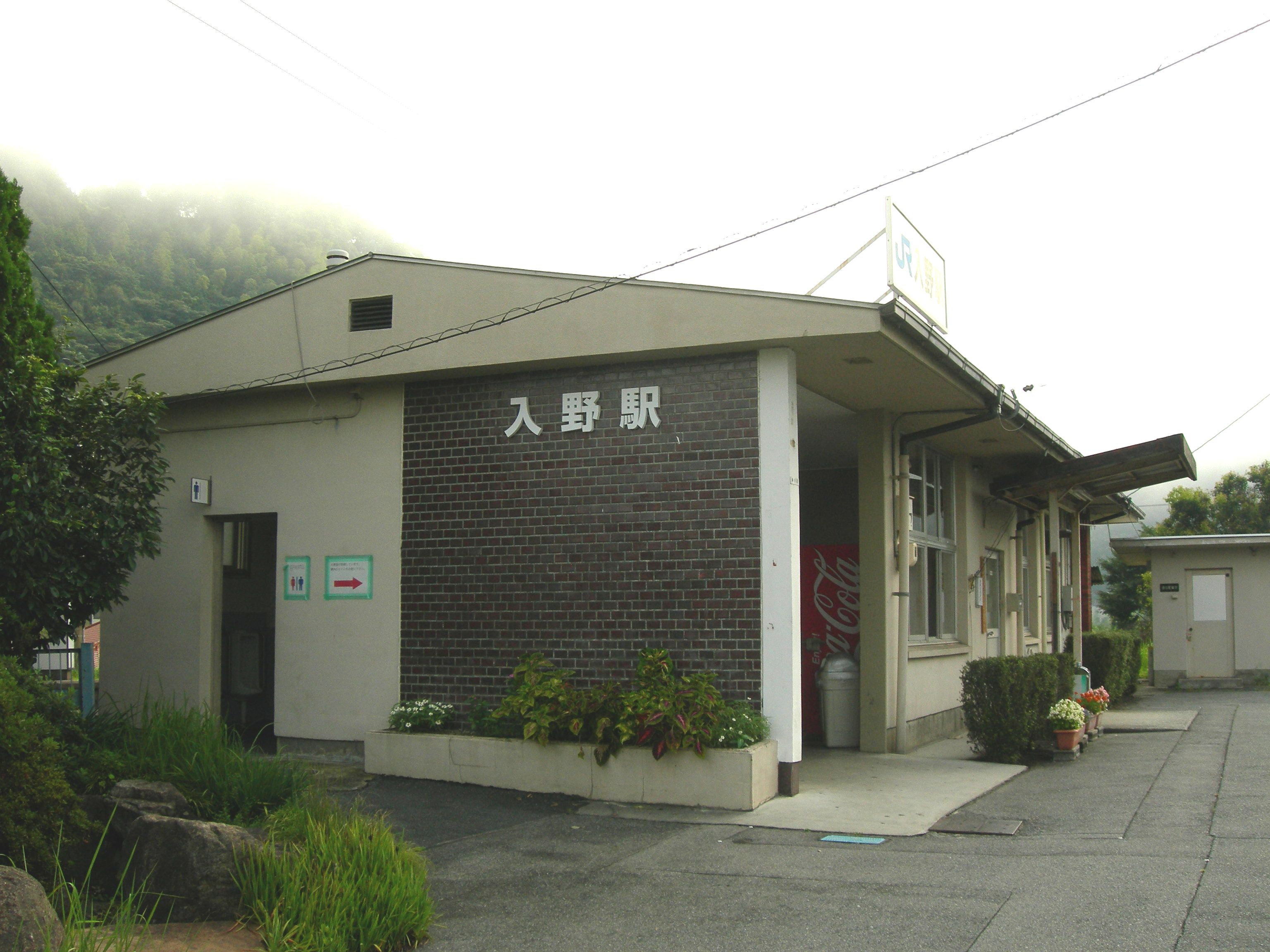
- Nyūno Station in August 2009

General information
- Location: 827-2 Nyūno, Kochi-cho, Higashihiroshima-shi, Hiroshima-ken 739-2208; Japan
- Coordinates: 34°27′38.38″N 132°51′6.36″E
- Owner: West Japan Railway Company
- Operator: West Japan Railway Company
- Line: G Sanyō Main Line
- Distance: 259.5 km (161.2 miles) from Kobe
- Platforms: 2 side platforms
- Tracks: 2
- Connections: Bus stop

Construction
- Accessible: Yes

Other information
- Status: Unstaffed
- Station code: JR-G13
- Website: Official website

History
- Opened: 12 December 1953

Passengers
- FY2019: 211

Services
Preceding station	JR West	Following station
Shiraichi towards Hiroshima	San'yō Line Rapid	Kōchi towards Itozaki
Shiraichi towards Hiroshima	San'yō Line Local	Kōchi towards Itozaki
Location
- Location within Hiroshima Prefecture Location within Japan

Nyūno Station (入野駅, Nyūno-eki) is a passenger railway station located in the city of Higashihiroshima, Hiroshima Prefecture, Japan. It is operated by the West Japan Railway Company (JR West).

== Lines ==
Nyūno Station is served by the JR West Sanyō Main Line, and is located 259.5 kilometers from the terminus of the line at Kobe.

== Station layout ==
The station consists of two unnumbered opposed side platforms connected by a footbridge. The station is unattended and the former office space is used as a local community hall.

== Platforms ==
station side	■ G Sanyō Main Line	for Saijō and Hiroshima
opposite side	■ G Sanyō Main Line	for Mihara and Fukuyama

== History ==
Nyūno Station was opened on 13 July 1917 as the Nyūno Signal Stop (入野信号場). It was updated to a full station on 25 December 1953. With the privatization of the Japanese National Railways (JNR) on 1 April 1987, the station came under the control of JR West.

== Passenger statistics ==
In fiscal 2019, the station was used by an average of 211 passengers daily.

== Surrounding area ==
- Japan National Route 432

== See also ==
- List of railway stations in Japan
