= Hongō Station (Hiroshima) =

Railway station in Mihara, Hiroshima Prefecture, Japan

Hongō Station 本郷駅
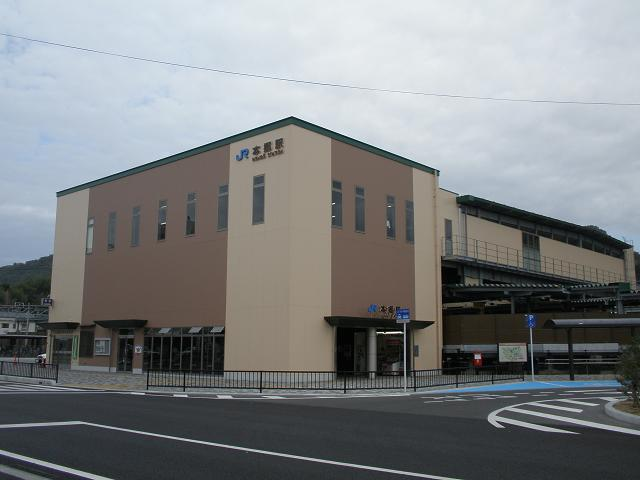
- Hongō Station in October 2009

General information
- Location: 6 Chome-22-1 Hongominami, Mihara-shi, Hiroshima-ken 729-0417; Japan
- Coordinates: 34°24′35.76″N 132°59′12.08″E
- Owner: West Japan Railway Company
- Operator: West Japan Railway Company
- Line: G Sanyō Main Line
- Distance: 242.8 km (150.9 miles) from Kobe
- Platforms: 2 side platforms
- Tracks: 2
- Connections: Bus stop

Construction
- Structure type: Ground level
- Accessible: Yes

Other information
- Status: Staffed (Midori no Madoguchi )
- Station code: JR-G15
- Website: Official website

History
- Opened: 10 June 1894

Passengers
- FY2019: 1696

Services
Preceding station	JR West	Following station
Kōchi towards Hiroshima	San'yō Line Rapid	Mihara towards Itozaki
Kōchi towards Hiroshima	San'yō Line Local	Mihara towards Itozaki
Location
- Location within Hiroshima Prefecture Location within Japan

Hongō Station (本郷駅, Hongō-eki) is a passenger railway station located in the city of Mihara, Hiroshima Prefecture, Japan. It is operated by the West Japan Railway Company (JR West).

== Lines ==
Hongō Station is served by the JR West Sanyō Main Line, and is located 242.8 kilometers from the terminus of the line at Kobe.

== Station layout ==
The station consists of two opposed side platforms connected by an elevated station building. The station has a Midori no Madoguchi staffed ticket office.

== Platforms ==
1	■ G Sanyō Main Line	for Saijō and Hiroshima
2	■ G Sanyō Main Line	for Mihara and Fukuyama

== History ==
Hongō Station was opened on 10 June 1894. With the privatization of the Japanese National Railways (JNR) on 1 April 1987, the station came under the control of JR West.

== Passenger statistics ==
In fiscal 2019, the station was used by an average of 1696 passengers daily.

== Surrounding area ==
- Mihara City Hall Hongo Branch
- Hiroshima Prefectural General Technical High School (former: Hiroshima Prefectural Hongo Technical High School)
- Mihara Municipal Hongo Elementary School
- Hongo Central Hospital
- Japan National Route 2

== See also ==
- List of railway stations in Japan
