= Shiraichi Station =

Railway station in Higashihiroshima, Hiroshima Prefecture, Japan

Shiraichi Station 白市駅
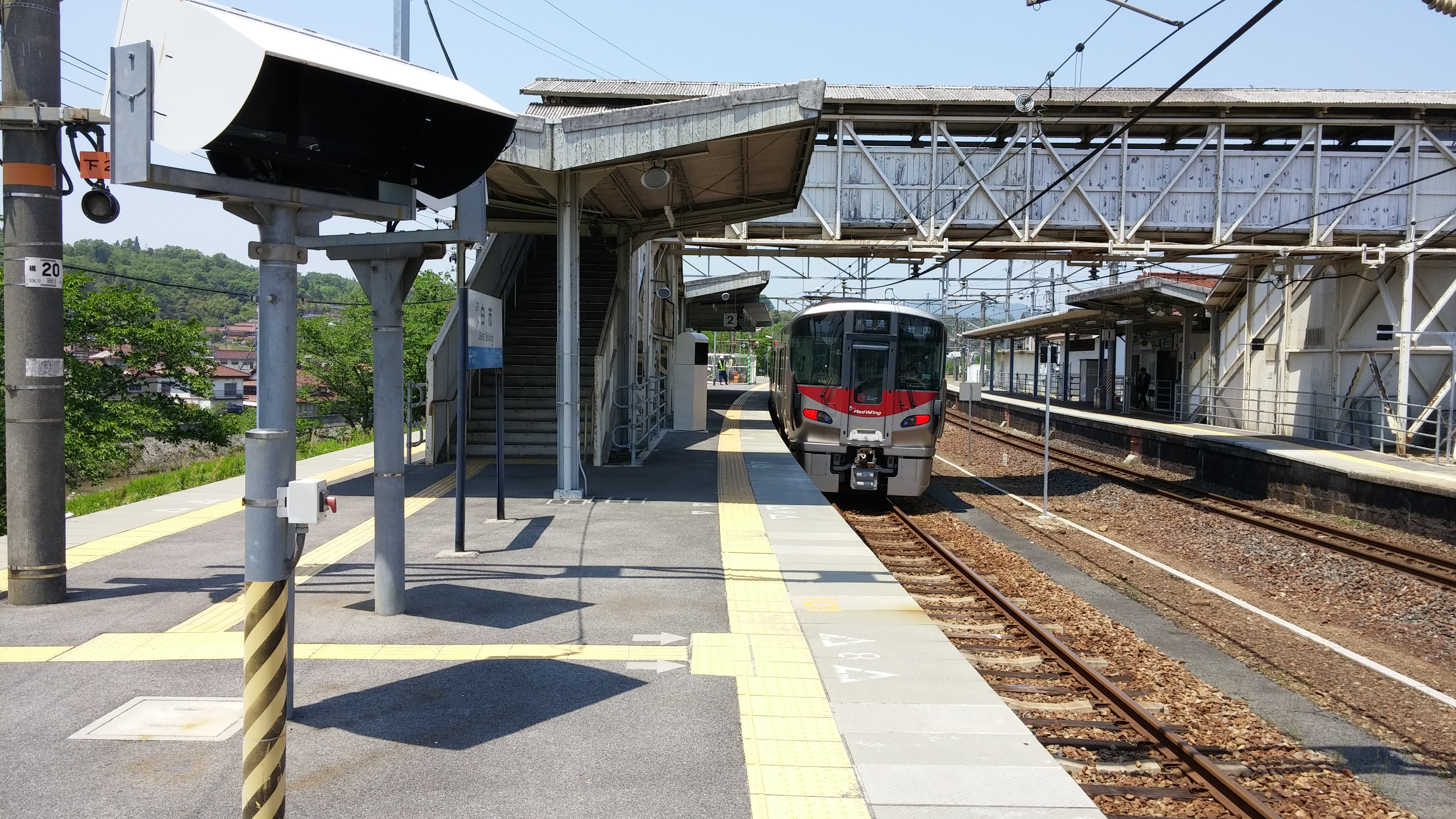
- Shiraichi Station platforms in May 2015

General information
- Location: 3357-2 Kodani, Takaya-cho, Higashihiroshima-shi, Hiroshima-ken 739-2121; Japan
- Coordinates: 34°26′35.78″N 132°49′56.58″E
- Owner: West Japan Railway Company
- Operator: West Japan Railway Company
- Line: G Sanyō Main Line
- Distance: 263.9 km (164.0 miles) from Kobe
- Platforms: 1 side + 1 island platforms
- Tracks: 2
- Connections: Bus stop

Construction
- Accessible: Yes

Other information
- Status: Staffed (Midori no Madoguchi )
- Station code: JR-G12
- Website: Official website

History
- Opened: 25 January 1895

Passengers
- FY2019: 1637

Services
Preceding station	JR West	Following station
Nishitakaya towards Hiroshima	San'yō Line Rapid	Nyūno towards Itozaki
Nishitakaya towards Hiroshima	San'yō Line Local	Nyūno towards Itozaki
Location
- Location within Hiroshima Prefecture Location within Japan

Shiraichi Station (白市駅, Shiraichi-eki) is a passenger railway station located in the city of Higashihiroshima, Hiroshima Prefecture, Japan. It is operated by the West Japan Railway Company (JR West).

== Lines ==
Shiraichi Station is served by the JR West Sanyō Main Line, and is located 263.9 kilometers from the terminus of the line at Kobe.

== Station layout ==
The station consists of one side platform and one island platform connected by a footbridge. The station has a Midori no Madoguchi staffed ticket office.

== Platforms ==
1	■ G Sanyō Main Line	for Mihara and Fukuyama
2, 3	■ G Sanyō Main Line	for Saijō and Hiroshima

== History ==
Shiraichi Station was opened on 25 January 1895. With the privatization of the Japanese National Railways (JNR) on 1 April 1987, the station came under the control of JR West.

== Passenger statistics ==
In fiscal 2019, the station was used by an average of 1637 passengers daily.

== Surrounding area ==
- Higashihiroshima Municipal Otari Elementary School
- Sanyo Expressway Otari Service Area

== See also ==
- List of railway stations in Japan
