= Kōchi Station (Hiroshima) =

Railway station in Higashihiroshima, Hiroshima Prefecture, Japan

Kōchi Station 河内駅
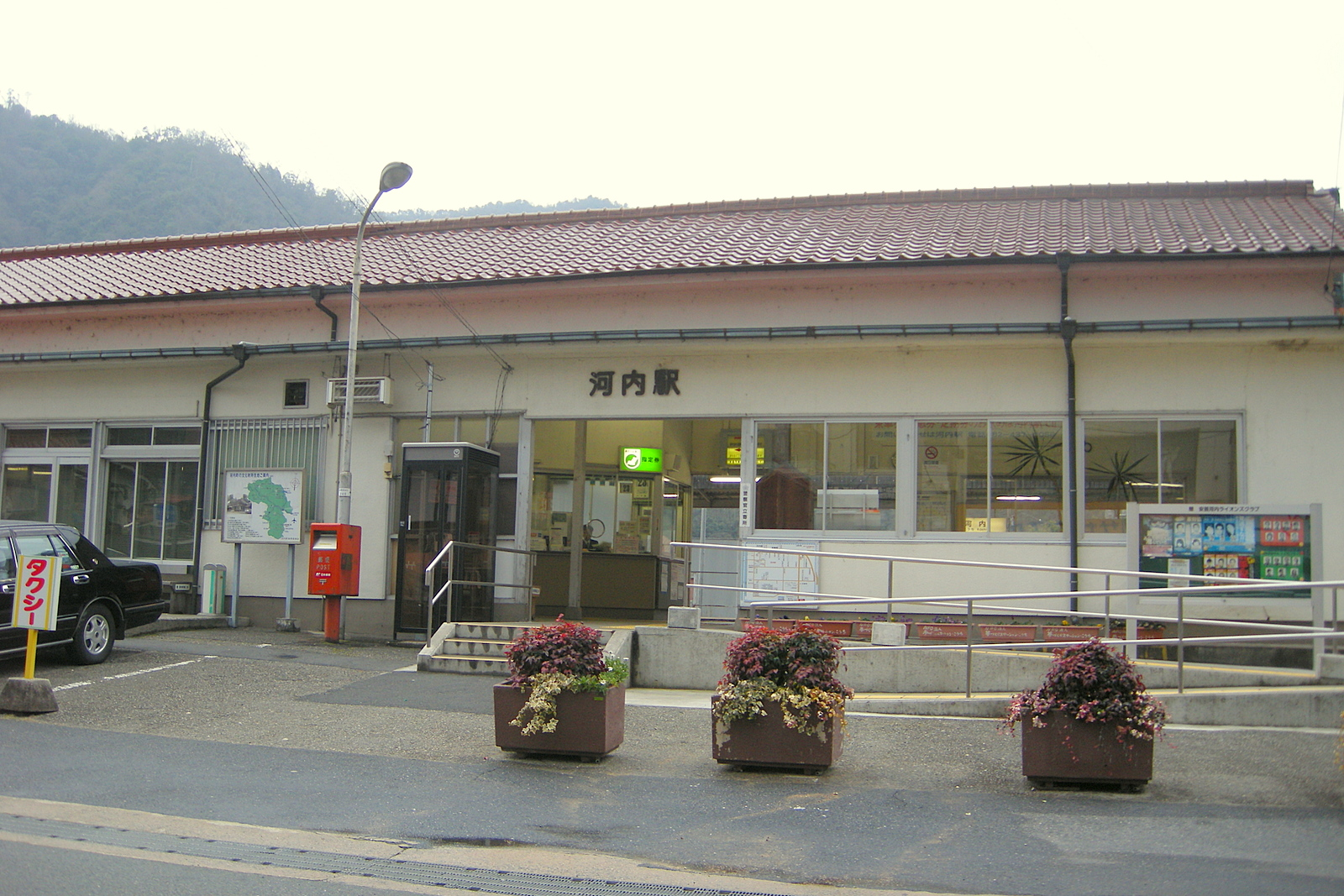
- Kōchi Station in January 2009

General information
- Location: 690-1 Kōchichōo Nakagōchi, Higashihiroshima-shi, Hiroshima-ken 739-2201; Japan
- Coordinates: 34°28′9.27″N 132°53′24.42″E
- Owner: West Japan Railway Company
- Operator: West Japan Railway Company
- Line: G Sanyō Main Line
- Distance: 255.1 km (158.5 miles) from Kobe
- Platforms: 1 side + 1 island platforms
- Tracks: 3
- Connections: Bus stop

Other information
- Status: Unattended
- Station code: JR-G14
- Website: Official website

History
- Opened: 10 June 1894

Passengers
- FY2019: 404

Services
Preceding station	JR West	Following station
Nyūno towards Hiroshima	San'yō Line Rapid	Hongō towards Itozaki
Nyūno towards Hiroshima	San'yō Line Local	Hongō towards Itozaki
Location
- Location within Hiroshima Prefecture Location within Japan

Kōchi Station (河内駅, Kōchi-eki) is a passenger railway station located in the city of Higashihiroshima, Hiroshima Prefecture, Japan. It is operated by the West Japan Railway Company (JR West).

== Lines ==
Kōchi Station is served by the JR West Sanyō Main Line, and is located 255.1 kilometers from the terminus of the line at Kobe.

== Station layout ==
The station consists of one side platform and one island platform connected by a footbridge. The station is unattended.

== Platforms ==
1	■ G Sanyō Main Line	for Mihara and Fukuyama
2, 3	■ G Sanyō Main Line	for Saijō and Hiroshima

== History ==
Kōchi Station was opened on 10 June 1894.

On 12 January 1931, an inbound express train passing Kōchi Station derailed at a turnout. The locomotive (C53 24) overturned, and the five passenger cars fell from the Mukunashi River Bridge in front of the station into the river, killing seven people and injuring 179 people.

With the privatization of the Japanese National Railways (JNR) on 1 April 1987, the station came under the control of JR West.

== Passenger statistics ==
In fiscal 2019, the station was used by an average of 404 passengers daily.

== Surrounding area ==
- Higashihiroshima City Hall Kōchi Branch (former Kōchi Town Hall)
- Japan National Route 432
- Higashi Hiroshima Municipal Kōchi Elementary School
- Higashi Hiroshima Municipal Kōchi Junior High School
- Hiroshima Prefectural Kōchi High School

== See also ==
- List of railway stations in Japan
