= Hanazono =

Hanazono may refer to:

== Places ==
- Hanazono University in Kyoto, Japan
- Higashi Osaka Hanazono Rugby Stadium in Higashi Osaka, Osaka Prefecture, Japan
- Hanazono, Saitama, former town in Saitama Prefecture, Japan
- Hanazono, Wakayama, former village in Wakayama Prefecture, Japan
- Hanazono Shrine, a Shinto shrine in Shinjuku, Tokyo, Japan

== People ==
- Emperor Hanazono, the 95th emperor of Japan
- Momoka Hanazono, Japanese professional wrestler
- Utako Hanazono, Japanese geisha

=== Fictional characters ===
- Hahari Hanazano, in the anime and manga series The 100 Girlfriends Who Really, Really, Really, Really, Really Love You
- Hakari Hanazano, in the anime and manga series The 100 Girlfriends Who Really, Really, Really, Really, Really Love You
- Hikari Hanazono, in the anime and manga series Special A
- Kaoru "Hanazono," in the anime and manga series The 100 Girlfriends Who Really, Really, Really, Really, Really Love You
- Kaoru Hanazono, in the anime and manga series Yawara!
- Karin Hanazono, in the anime and manga series Kamichama Karin
- Sakura Hanazono, in the anime and manga series Kaichō wa Maid-sama!
- Shizuma Hanazono, in the anime Strawberry Panic
- Tae Hanazono, a character in the multimedia franchise BanG Dream!
- Yurine Hanazono, in the anime and manga series Dropkick on My Devil!

== See also ==
- Hanazono Station (disambiguation)
