= Yuzuru =

- Pronunciation: jɯdzɯɾɯ (IPA)
- Gender: Male

Origin
- Origin: Japanese
- Meaning: Different meanings depending on the kanji used

Yuzuru is a masculine Japanese given name.

== Written forms ==
Yuzuru can be written using different kanji characters. Here are some examples:

- 譲, "transfer"
- 巽, "to obey" or "southeast" (from I Ching)
- 遜, "modest"
- 結弦, "tie the bowstring"

The name can be written in hiragana as ゆずる or ゆづる. In katakana, it is either ユズル or ユヅル.

== Notable people with the name ==
- Yuzuru Fujimoto (藤本 譲), Japanese voice actor
- Yuzuru Hanyu (羽生 結弦; born 1994), Japanese figure skater
- Yuzuru Hanyuda (羽入田 譲; born 1976), Japanese skeleton racer
- Yuzuru Hiraga (平賀 譲; 1878–1943), Japanese naval officer
- Yuzuru Inoue (井上 謙; born 1963), Japanese volleyball player
- Yuzuru Ito, Japanese founder of Achieving Competitive Excellence
- Yuzuru Kojima (born 1938), Canadian judoka
- Yuzuru Nozu (野津 謙; 1899–1983), Japanese footballer
- Yuzuru Shimada (島田 譲; born 1990), Japanese footballer
- Yuzuru Tachikawa (立川 譲; born 1981), Japanese director

== Fictional characters ==
- Yuzuru Fushimi (伏見 弓弦), a character from the Ensemble Stars! franchise
- Yuzuru Kenmochi (剣持 弓弦), a supporting character from Witch Watch
- Yuzuru Kido (木戸 譲), a supporting character from Medaka Kuroiwa Is Impervious to My Charms
- Yuzuru Kouenji (高円寺 譲), a character in the tokusatsu series B-Robo Kabutack
- Yuzuru Nishimiya (音無 結弦), a character in A Silent Voice
- Yuzuru Otonashi (音無 結弦), the main protagonist of Angel Beats!
- Yuzuru Tachibana (橘 譲), a supporting character in the movie Drifting Home
- Yuzuru Yamai (八舞 夕弦), a supporting character from the Date A Live series

== See also ==
- Yūzuru (夕鶴) meaning "evening crane" is a popular Japanese opera.
