= Hikari (train) =

Japanese high-speed Shinkansen train service

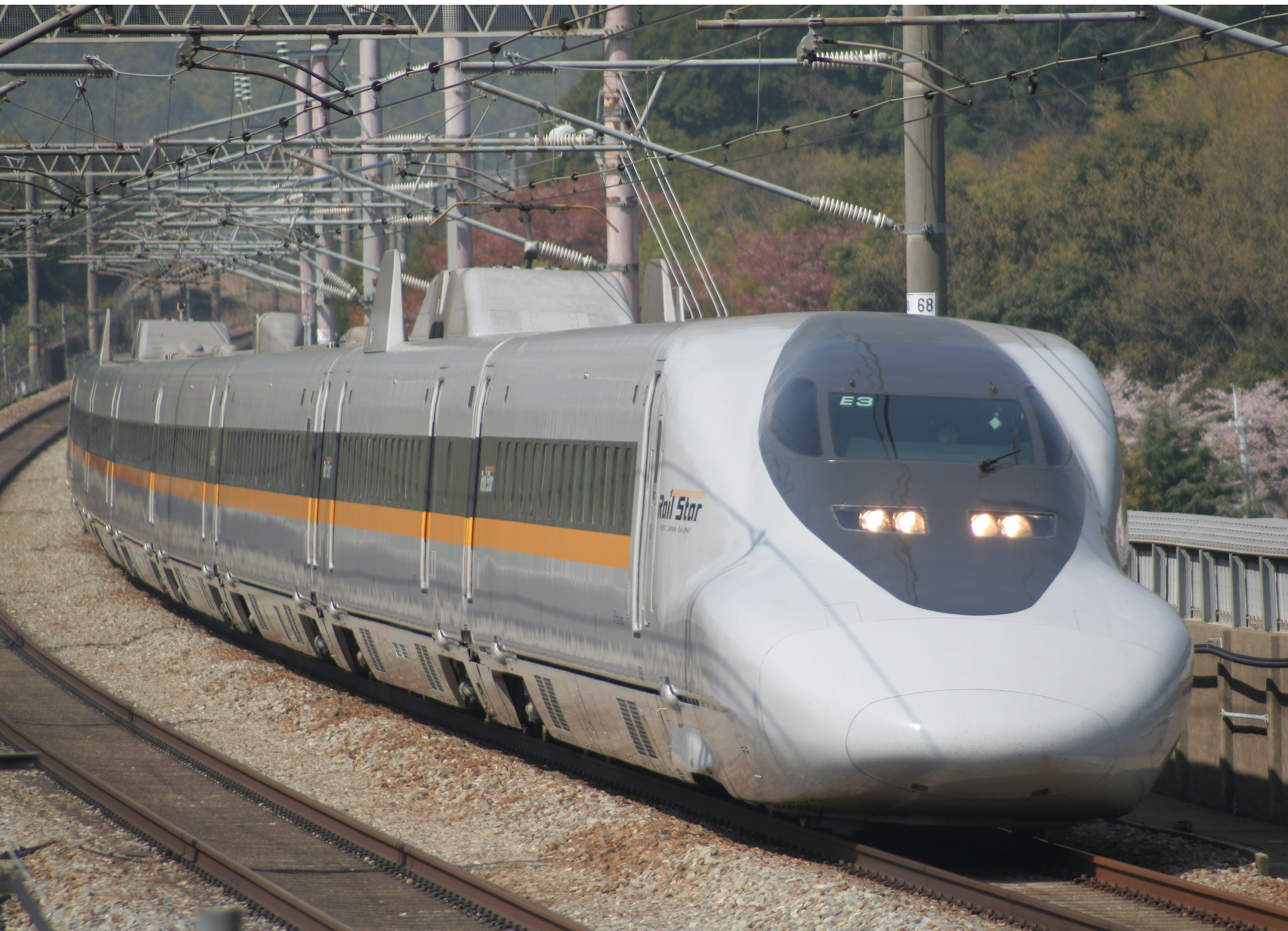
- 700 series Hikari Rail Star, April 2009

Overview
- Service type: Shinkansen (Limited-stop)
- Status: Operational
- First service: 25 April 1958 (Express); 1 October 1964 (Shinkansen)
- Current operators: JR Central, JR West
- Former operator: JNR

Route
- Termini: Hakata (San'yō Shinkansen); Shin-Ōsaka (Tokaido Shinkansen and San'yō Shinkansen); Tokyo (Tokaido Shinkansen)
- Lines used: Tōkaidō Shinkansen; San'yō Shinkansen

On-board services
- Class: Green + Standard
- Catering facilities: Trolley refreshment service (until October 2023)

Technical
- Rolling stock: 500/700/N700/N700A/N700S series
- Track gauge: 1,435 mm (4 ft 8 1/2 in) standard gauge
- Electrification: 25 kV AC, 60 Hz
- Operating speed: 285 km/h (177 mph) (Tokaido Shinkansen); 300 km/h (190 mph) (San'yō Shinkansen)

Hikari (ひかり; "Light") is a high-speed train service running on the Tōkaidō and San'yō Shinkansen "bullet train" lines in Japan. Slower than the premier Nozomi but faster than the all-stations Kodama, the Hikari is the fastest train service on the Tōkaidō and San'yō Shinkansen that can be used with the Japan Rail Pass, which is not valid for travel on the Nozomi or Mizuho trains except through a special supplementary ticket.

== Service variations ==
=== West Hikari ===
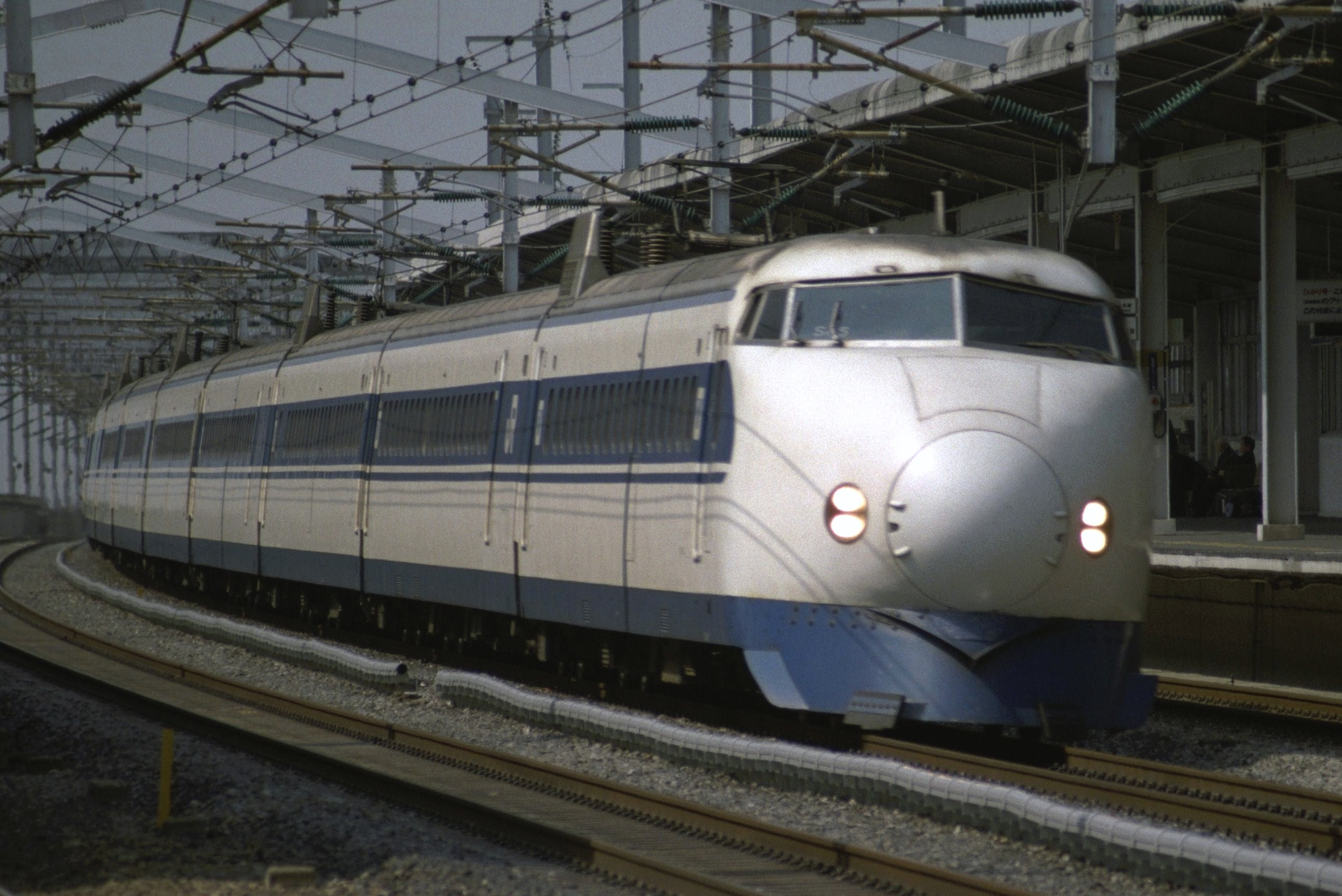
0 series 12-car set SK5 on a West Hikari service, March 1997

These JR West services first appeared in 1988 on the San'yō Shinkansen between Shin-Ōsaka and Hakata using 6-car 0 series trains. 0 series 12-car S_{K} units were employed on these services from 1989. From 11 March 2000, they were mostly replaced by the new 700 series Hikari Rail Star services, and were finally withdrawn on 21 April 2000. The West Hikari livery had a similar colour pattern to the newer 100 series rolling stock, most of which were allocated to JR Central when the Japanese National Railways (JNR) was privatised in 1987. The interior was refurbished, with the conventional 2+3 seat configuration changed to a 2+2 configuration, and the buffet car converted into a café car.

=== Grand Hikari ===
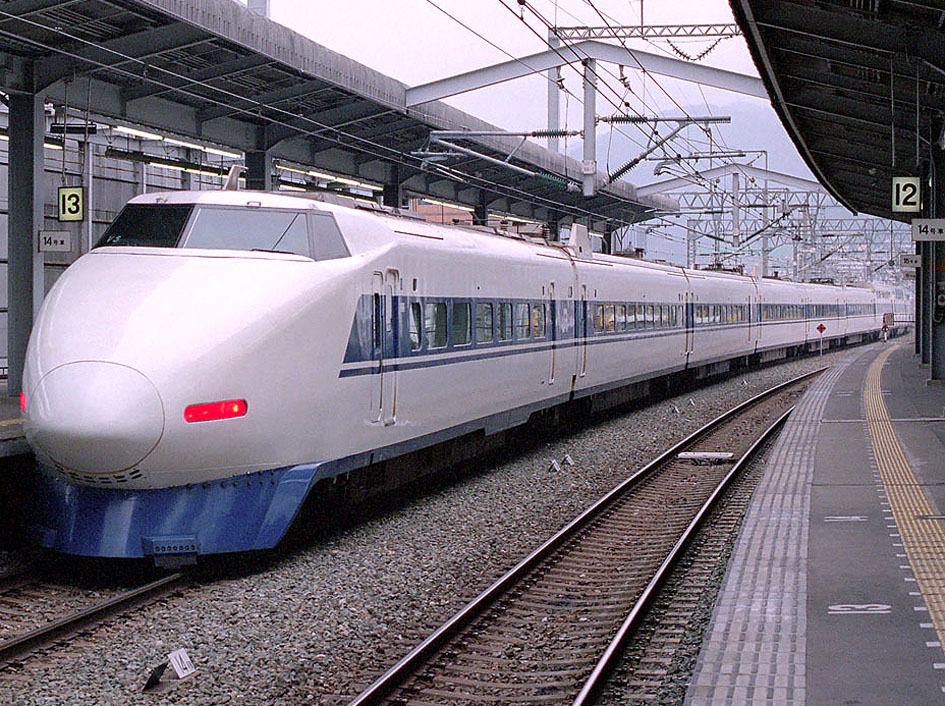
100 series 16-car set V5 with four double deckers on a Grand Hikari service

These were the premier services operated between Tokyo and Hakata from 11 March 1989 using JR West 16-car 100 series V sets with four double-deck centre cars including a restaurant car. JR West inherited no 100 series train sets when JNR was privatised. On the other hand, unlike the Tōkaidō Shinkansen, the San'yō Shinkansen had a severe competition with aeroplanes, and there was an imminent need to introduce a faster and more comfortable flagship train.

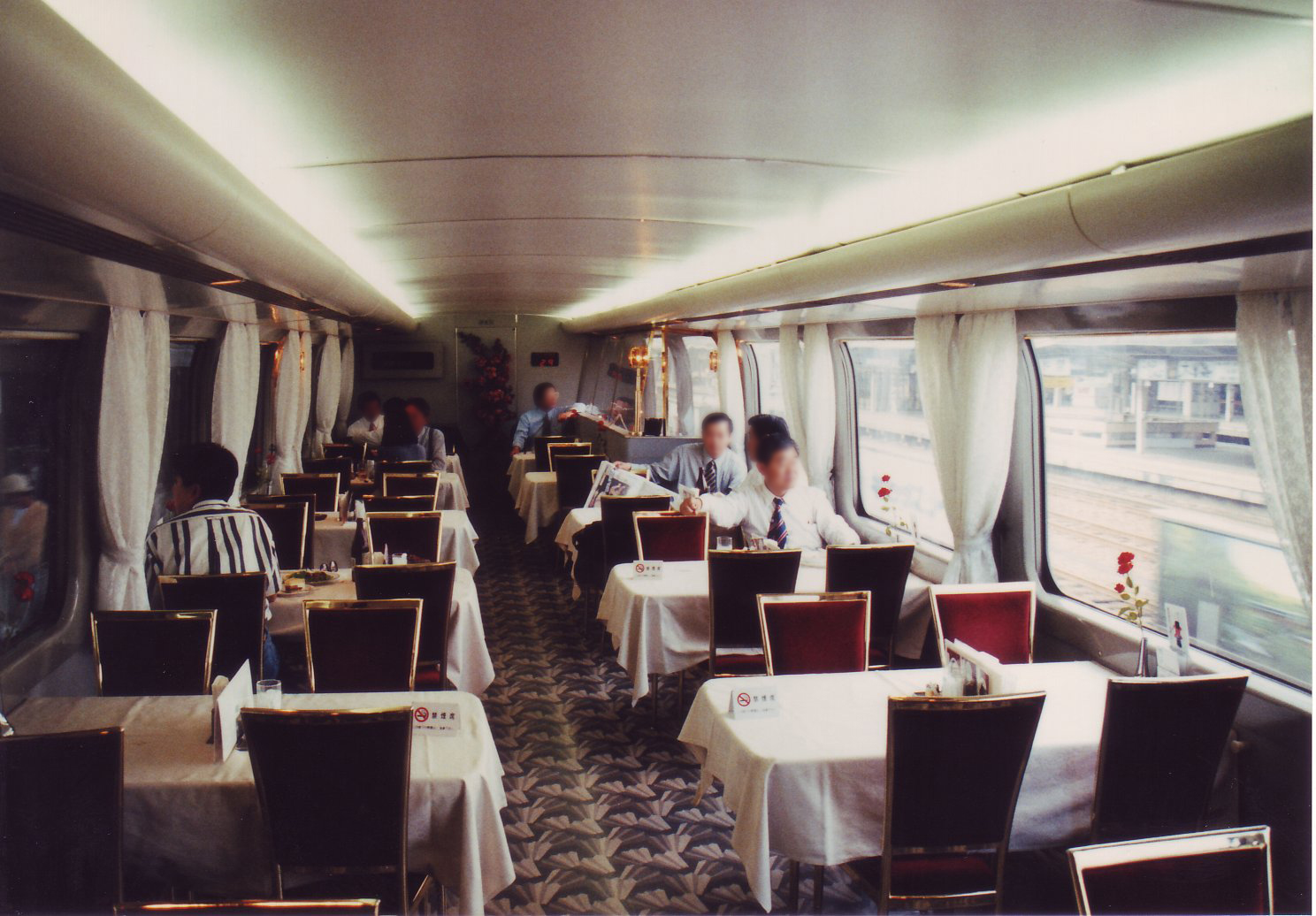
Restaurant car of a Grand Hikari train set

The 100 series V sets were designed to be operated at 275 km/h (171 mph), but due to noise complaints, JR West had to reduce its maximum speed to 230 km/h (143 mph) on the San'yō Shinkansen (compared to 220 km/h (137 mph) for other Hikari services). From 11 March 2000, restaurant car services were discontinued on all trains, and from May 2002 onwards, the few remaining Grand Hikari services were limited to special service on the San'yō Shinkansen only. The last Grand Hikari ran in November 2002.

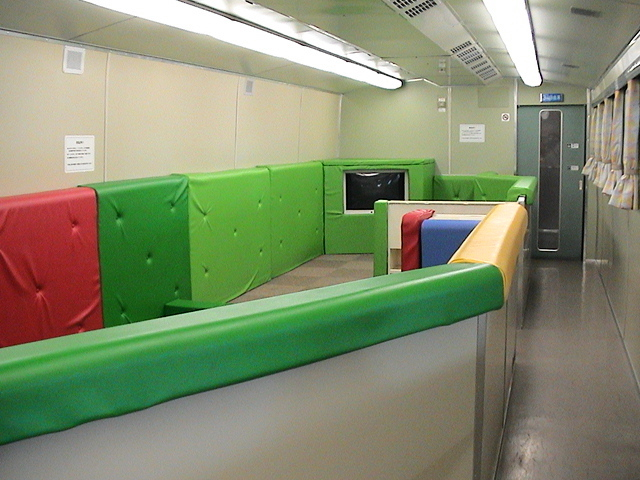
Children's play area on a Family Hikari service, December 2003

=== Family Hikari ===
First appearing in the summer of 1995, these seasonal services operated between Shin-Ōsaka and Hakata during holiday periods using special 6-car 0 series sets (R2 and R24) which included a children's play area in car 3. All seats were reserved on these services.

=== Hikari Rail Star ===
JR West began operating the Hikari Rail Star service from the start of the new timetable on 11 March 2000. This service is limited to the Sanyo Shinkansen line, and uses special 8-car 700-7000 series trains with a distinctive livery and a maximum speed of 285 km/h (177 mph). JR West introduced the service to provide better competition against airlines on the Osaka-Fukuoka route. These services do not have Green car accommodation, but the reserved seating cars feature 2+2 seating and also some 4-seat compartments instead of the standard 3+2 arrangement in non-reserved seating cars. The front row of seats in these cars feature power outlets for laptop users. With all but 3 Hikari services (590-592) solely running on the Sanyo Shinkansen being replaced by through Kyushu Shinkansen Sakura services from 12 March 2011, the 8-car 700 series sets used on the service have been running mostly on all-stations Kodama services on the San'yō Shinkansen line. However, as of 14 March 2026, there is still one Hikari Rail Star service, Hikari Rail Star 680, which departs from Shin-Shimonoseki to Okayama at 06:11 every morning, stopping at every station except Asa. As of June 2025, the Hikari Rail Star is the only special service variation to run on the Hikari service.

== Stopping patterns (as of June 2024) ==
Legend

●	All trains stop
△	Some trains stop

Station	Tokyo – Hakata*
Tōkyō	●
Shinagawa	●
Shin-Yokohama	●
Odawara	△
Atami	△
Mishima	△
Shizuoka	△
Hamamatsu	△
Toyohashi	△
Nagoya	●
Gifu-Hashima	△
Maibara	△
Kyoto	●
Shin-Ōsaka	●
Shin-Kōbe	●
Nishi-Akashi	△
Himeji	●
Aioi	△
Okayama	●
Shin-Kurashiki	△
Fukuyama	●
Shin-Onomichi	△
Mihara	△
Higashi-Hiroshima	△
Hiroshima	●
Shin-Iwakuni	△
Tokuyama	△
Shin-Yamaguchi	△
Shin-Shimonoseki	△
Kokura	●
Hakata	●

== Rolling stock ==
- 500 series 8-car V sets
- 700 series 8-car E sets
- N700 series 8-car S/R sets
- N700A series 16-car X/K sets, modified from N700 series Z/N sets
- N700S series 16-car J/H sets
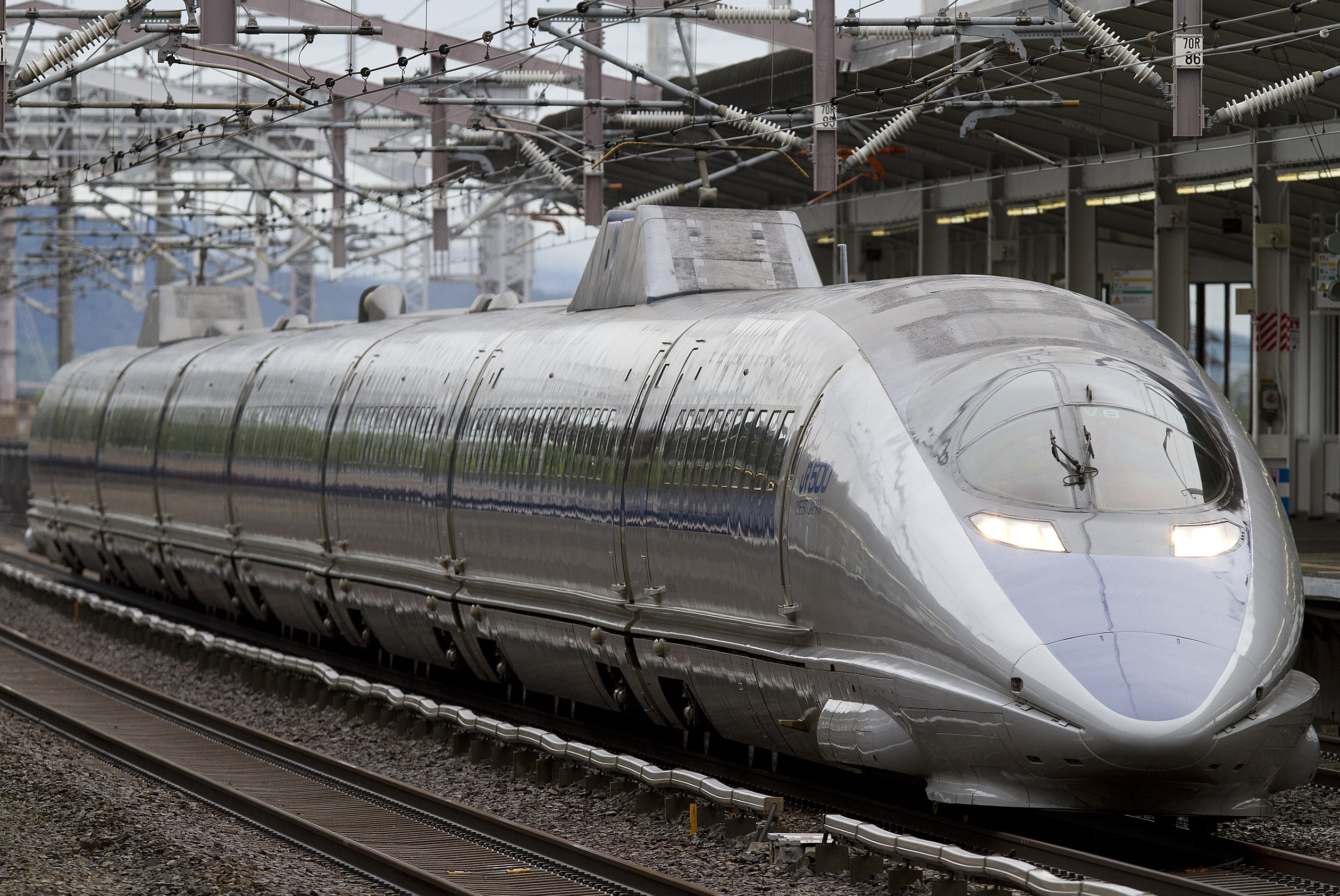
JR West 500 series, May 2012

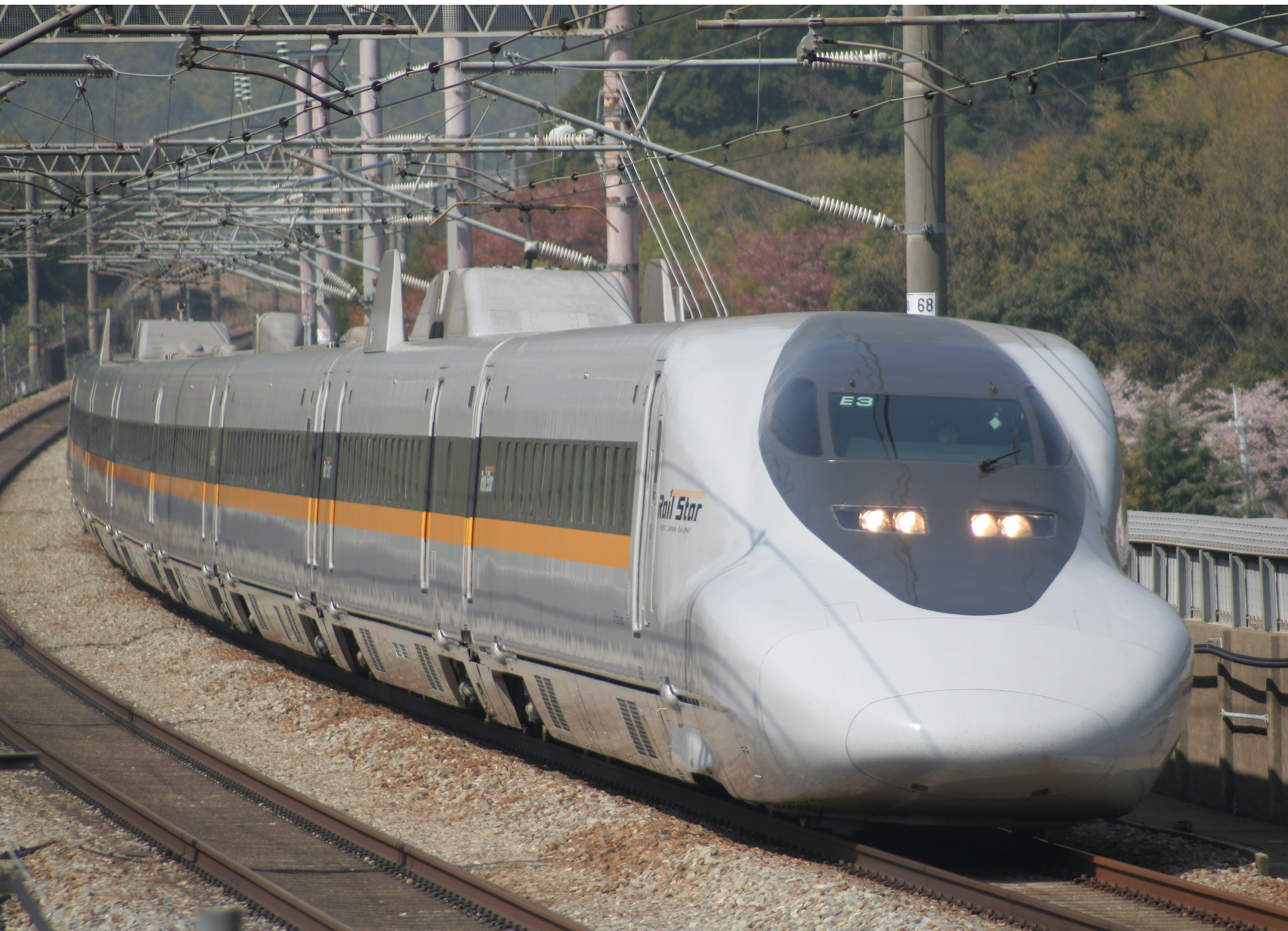
700 series Hikari Rail Star, April 2009

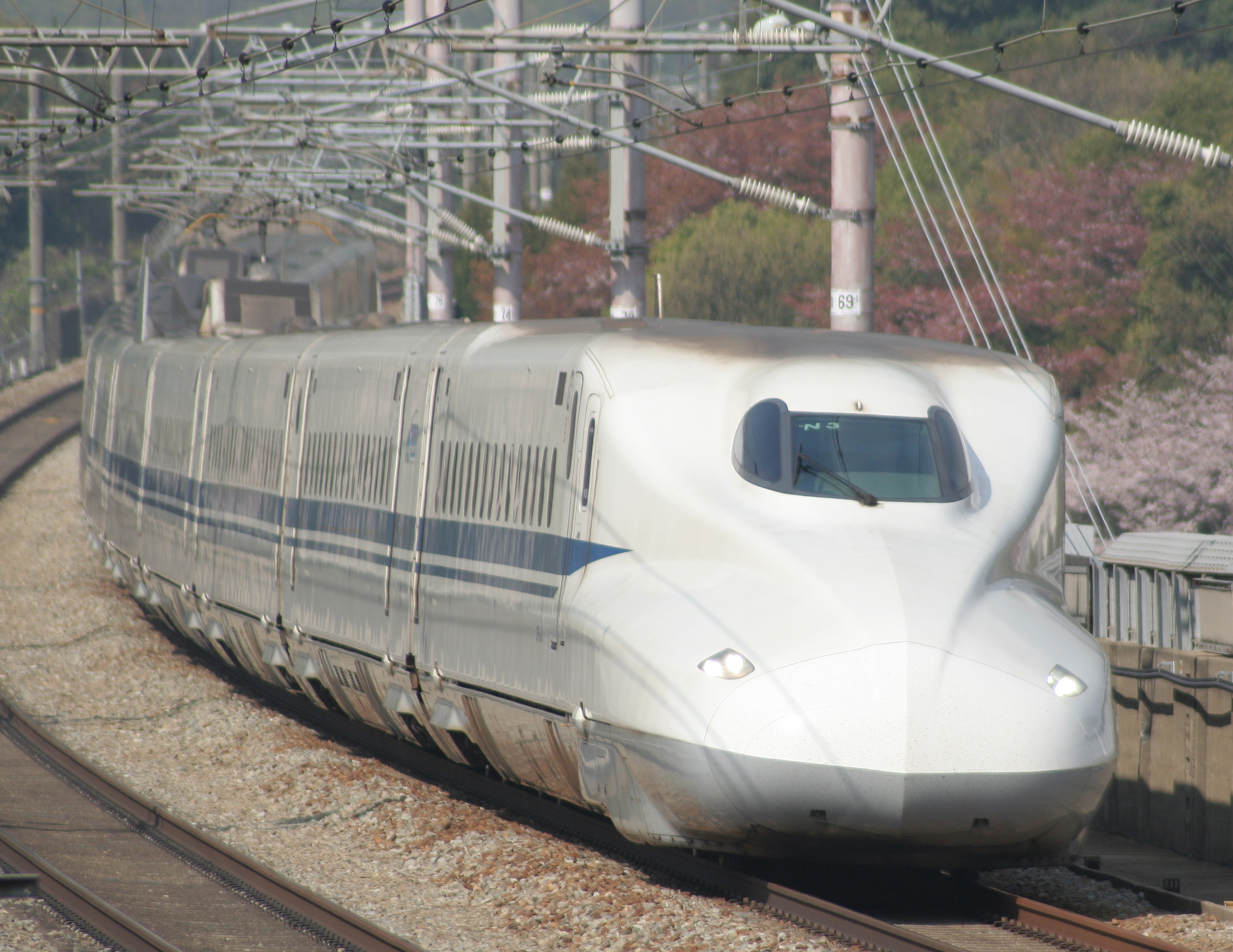
JR West N700 series, April 2009

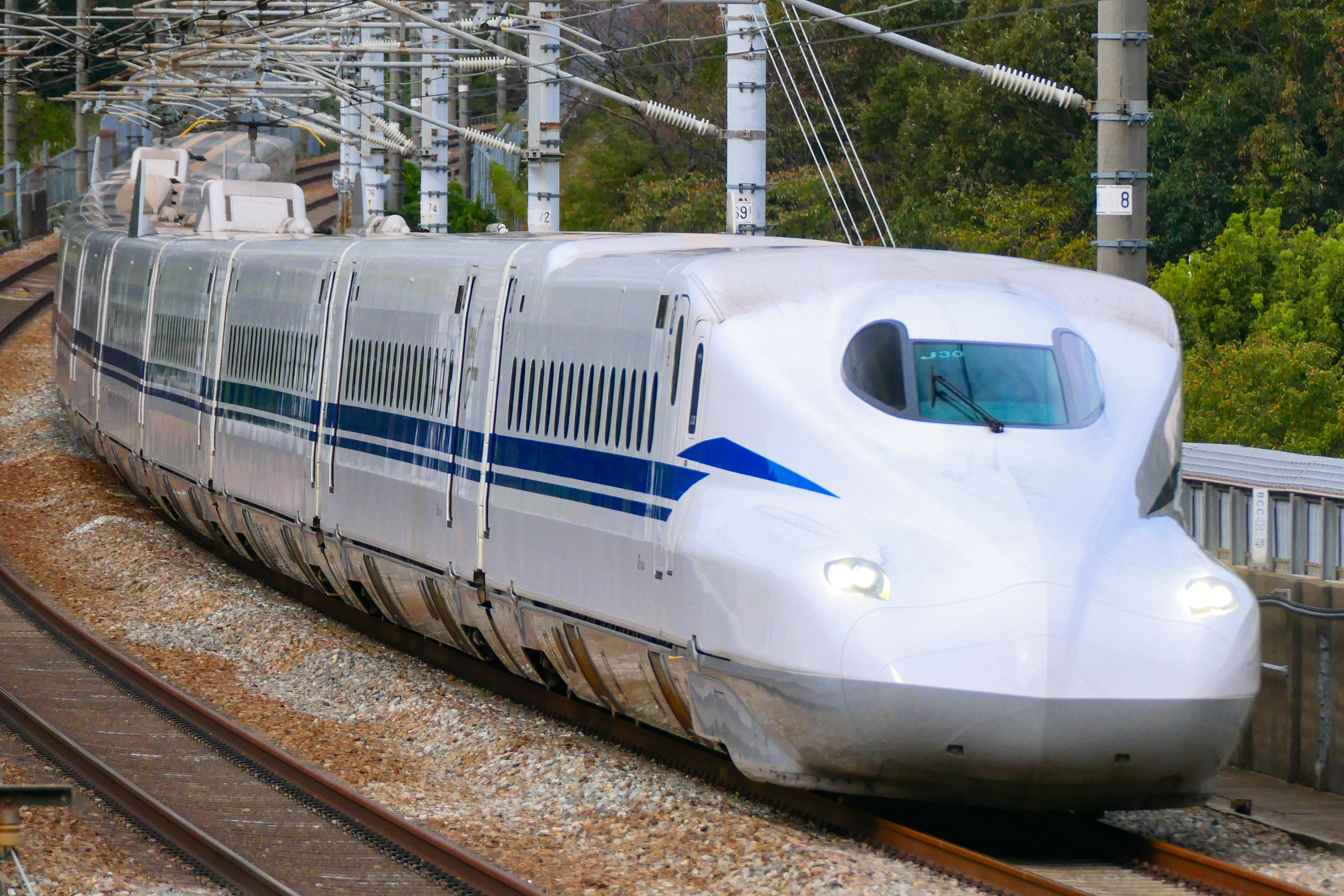
JR Central N700S series, September 2022

=== Former rolling stock ===
- 0 series
- 100 series
- 300 series
- 500 series 16-car W sets
- 700-0 series
- 700-3000 series
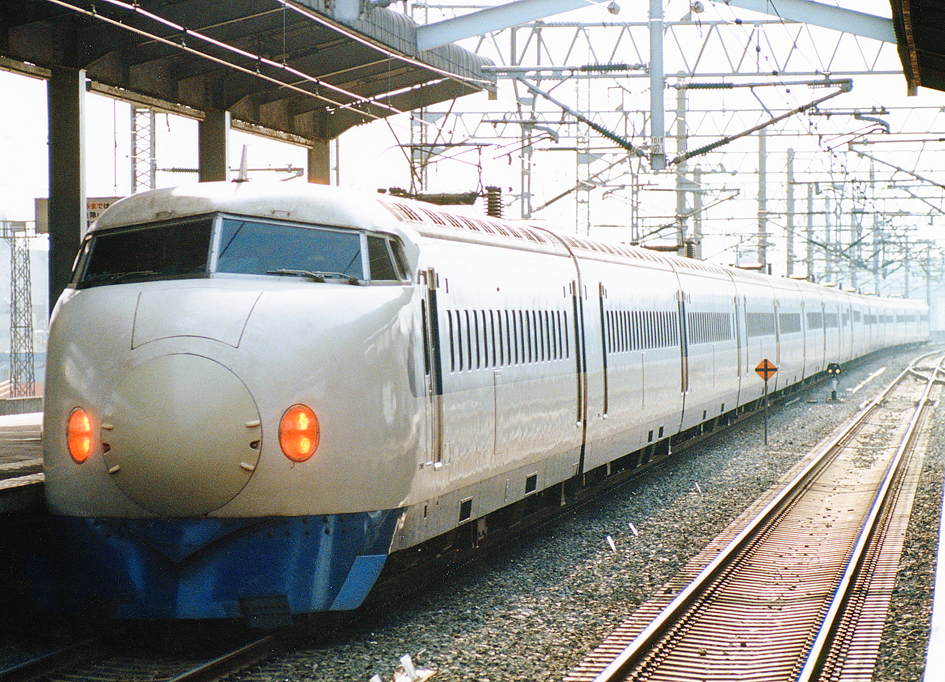
0 series, 1987

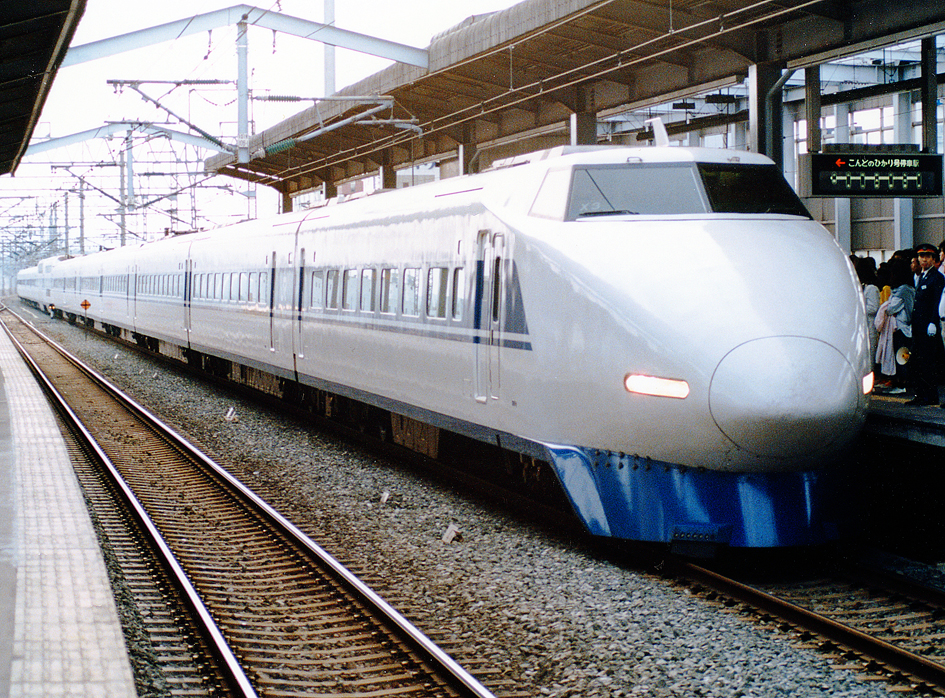
100 Series, 1987

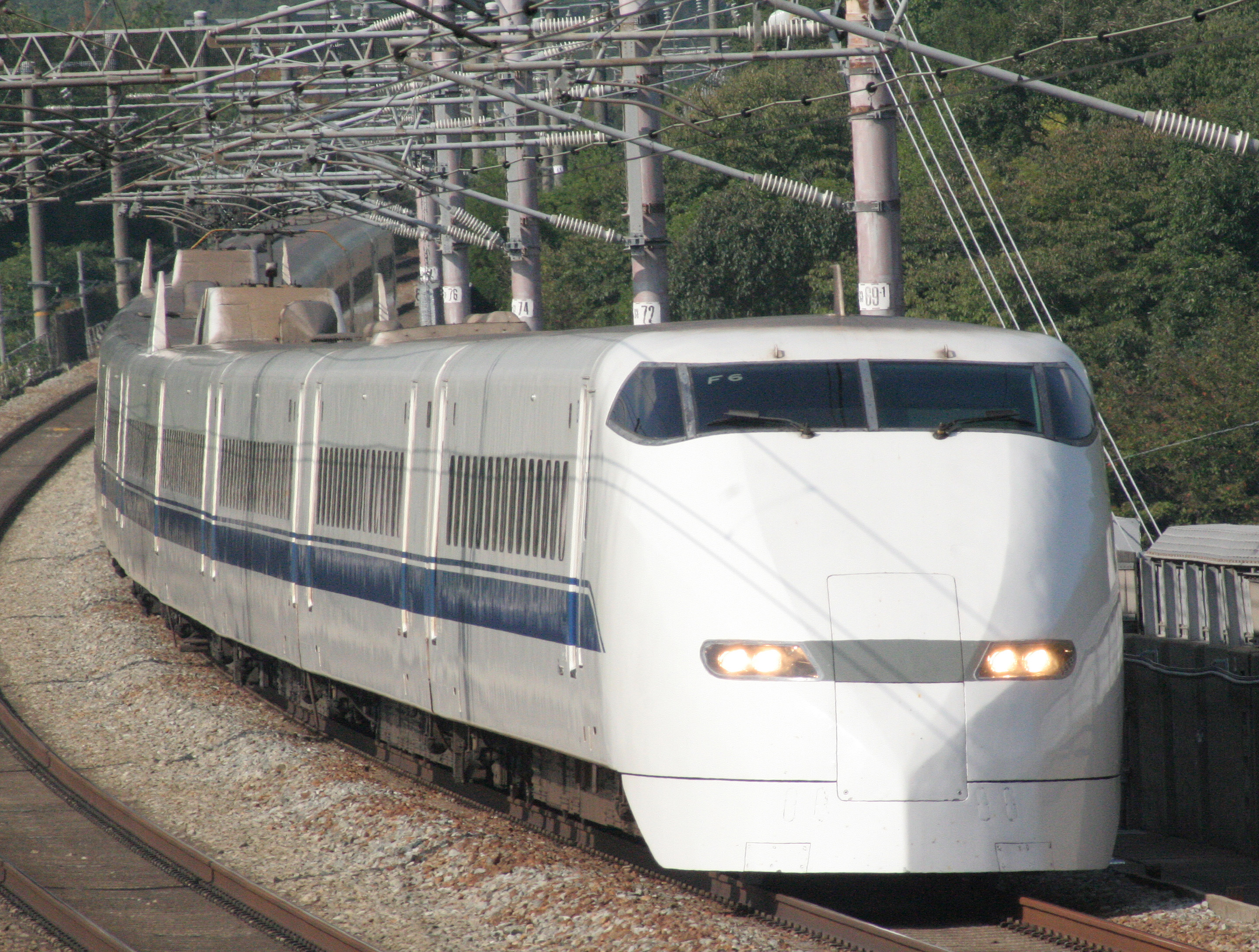
JR West 300 series, 8 October 2008

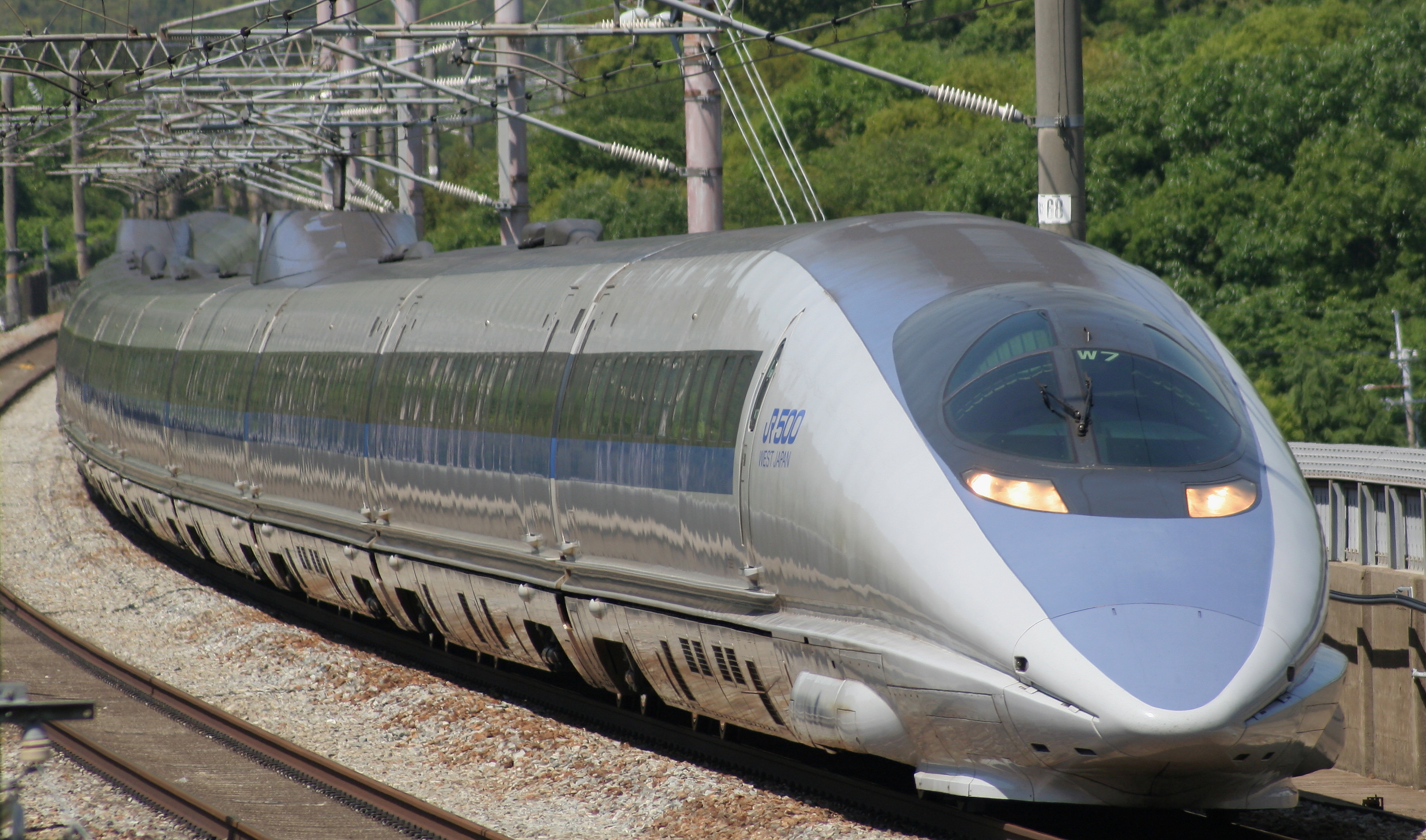
JR West 500 series, May 2008

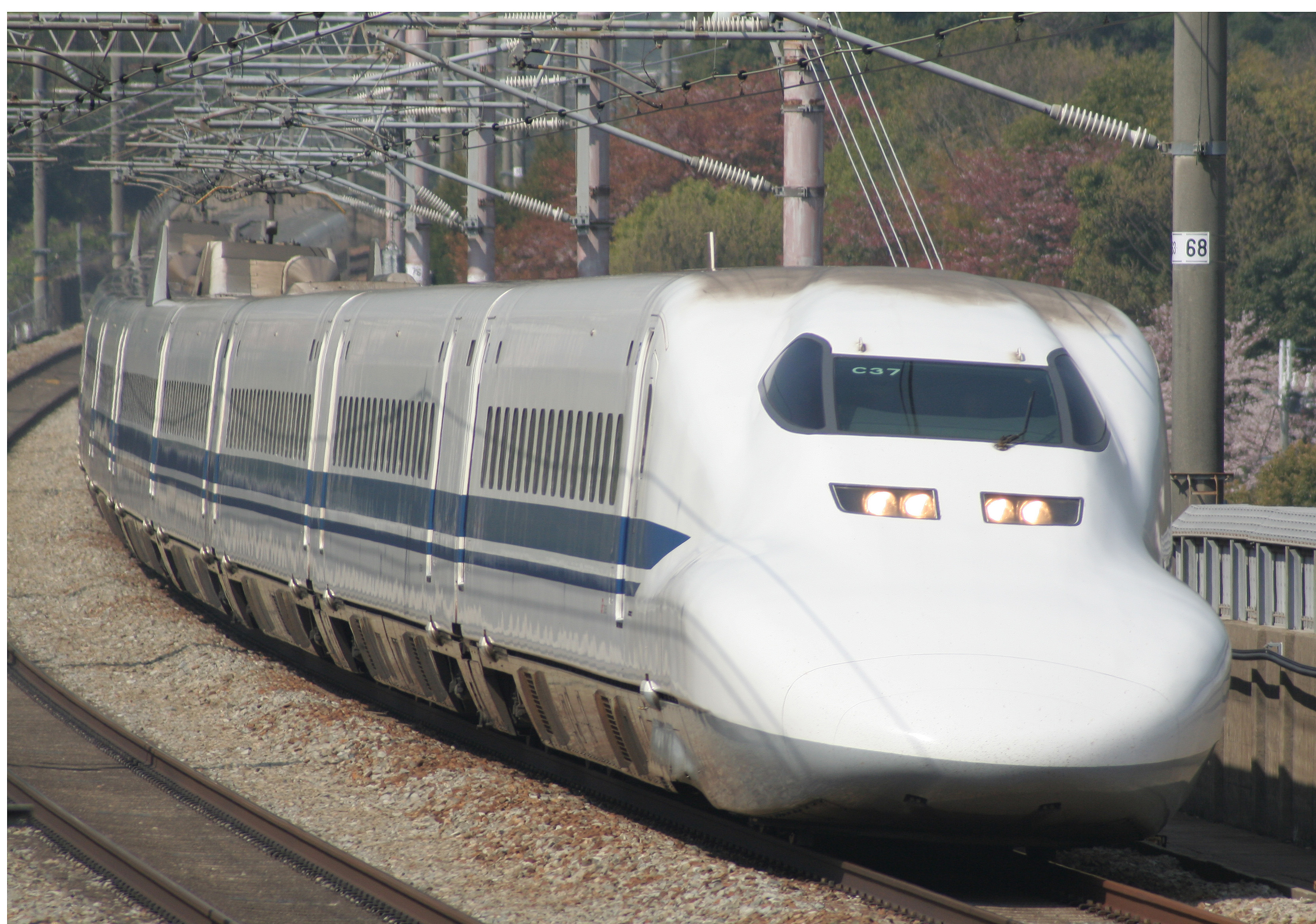
JR Central 700 series, April 2009

== Train formations ==
=== N700 series / N700S series (16 cars) ===
16-car N700 and N700S series services are formed as follows with car 1 at the Hakata end and car 16 at the Tokyo end. All cars are non-smoking except for smoking compartments located in Cars 3, 7, 10, and 15.

Car No.	1	2	3	4	5	6	7	8	9	10	11	12	13	14	15	16
Accommodation	Non-reserved	Non-reserved	Non-reserved	Non-reserved	Non-reserved	Reserved	Reserved	Green	Green	Green	Reserved	Reserved	Reserved	Reserved	Reserved	Reserved

=== N700 series (8 cars) ===
8-car N700 series services are formed as follows with car 1 at the Hakata end and car 8 at the Shin-Osaka end. All cars are non-smoking except for smoking compartments located in Cars 3 and 7.

Car No.	1	2	3	4	5	6		7	8
Accommodation	Non-reserved	Non-reserved	Non-reserved	Reserved	Reserved	Reserved	Green	Reserved	Reserved

=== 700 series Hikari Rail Star ===
8-car 700 series Hikari Rail Star services are formed as follows with car 1 at the Hakata end and car 8 at the Shin-Osaka end. All cars are non-smoking.

Car No.	1	2	3	4	5	6	7	8
Accommodation	Non-reserved	Non-reserved	Non-reserved	Reserved	Reserved	Reserved	Reserved	Reserved

== History ==
Before and during World War II, Hikari was the name of an express train operated by Japan from Busan in Korea to Changchun in Manchuria.

The name Hikari was first introduced in Japan on 25 April 1958 for express services operating between Hakata and Beppu in Kyushu. This service operated until 30 September 1964, the day before the Tokaido Shinkansen opened.

When the Tokaido Shinkansen opened on 1 October 1964, the Hikari was the fastest train on the line, initially travelling from Tokyo Station to Shin-Osaka Station with only two stops (Nagoya and Kyoto). Hikari service was extended to the Sanyo Shinkansen later, although the Hikari trains were only slightly faster than the Kodama trains, earning them the derisive portmanteau nickname "Hidama." The Hikari trains remained the fastest trains until the opening of Nozomi trains on 14 March 1992.

In March 2008, the new N700 Series Shinkansen was put into service on a morning Hikari service between Shin-Yokohama and Hiroshima stations, and a late night run between Tokyo and Nagoya. A third N700 Hikari run between Nagoya and Tokyo was added in October 2008, and a few other N700 Hikari runs have since been added.

From the start of the revised timetable on 17 March 2012, Hikari Rail Star services using 8-car 700 series E sets became entirely non-smoking.

As of 2012, JR Central Hikari services operating throughout the Tokaido/Sanyo corridor primarily use 16-car N700 series and 700 series sets. Most Hikari trains pull over at intermediate stations such as Shizuoka, Hamamatsu, Toyohashi, Maibara or Himeji to allow faster Nozomi services, to pass through without stopping.

In an announcement by JR Central, JR West, and JR Kyushu made on 17 October 2023, the companies stated that all onboard smoking rooms on the Tokaido, San'yo, and Kyushu Shinkansen trains would be discontinued by Q2 2024, which took effect on 16 March 2024. In addition, all smoking rooms located on station platforms on the aforementioned Shinkansen lines would also be discontinued.

== See also ==
- List of named passenger trains of Japan
