= Nishitakaya Station =

Railway station in Higashihiroshima, Hiroshima Prefecture, Japan

Nishitakaya Station 西高屋駅
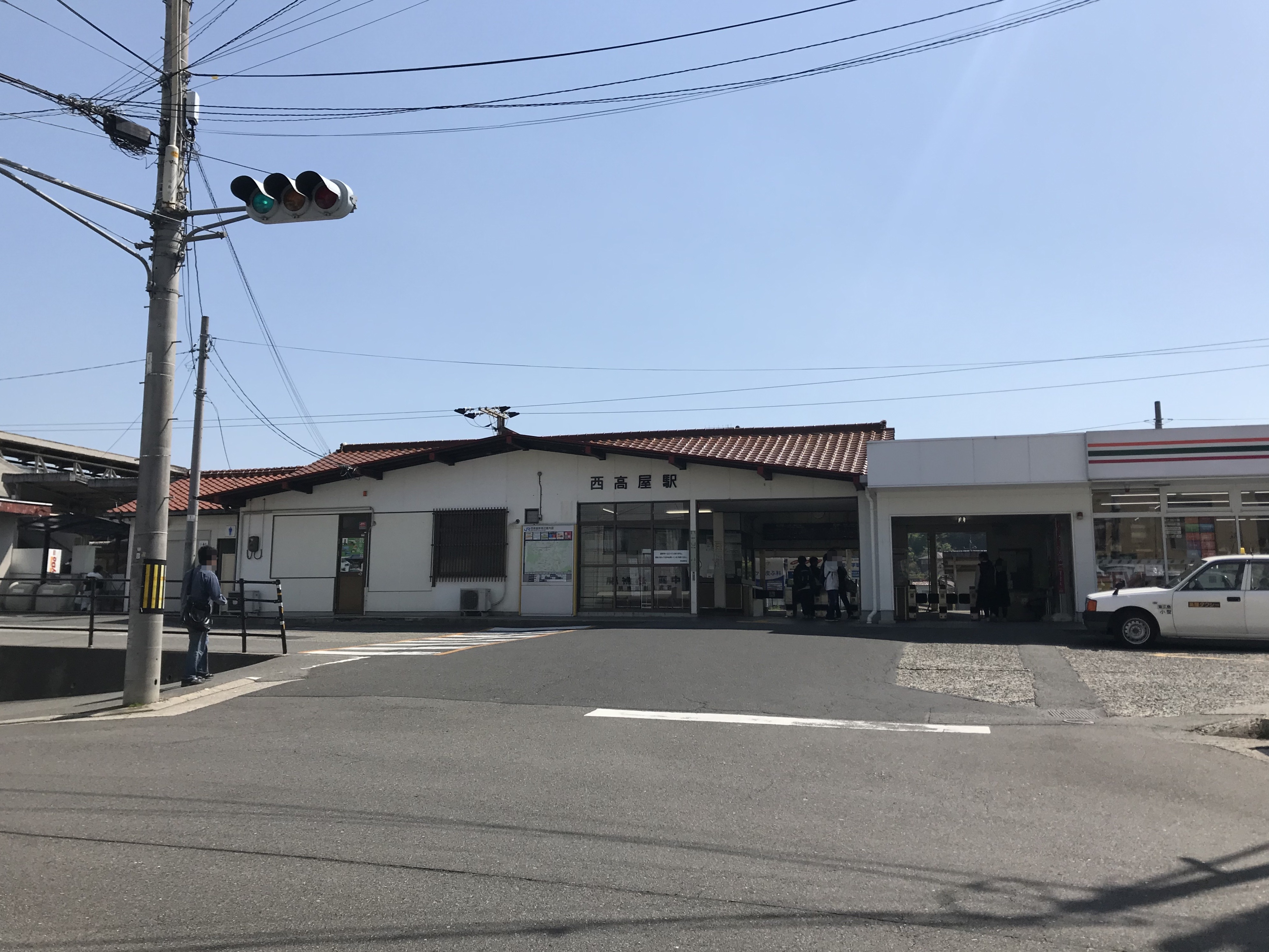
- Nishitakaya Station in April 2018

General information
- Location: 441-3 Nakashima, Takaya-cho, Higashihiroshima-shi, Hiroshima-ken 739-2125; Japan
- Coordinates: 34°26′47.15″N 132°47′16.94″E
- Owner: West Japan Railway Company
- Operator: West Japan Railway Company
- Line: G Sanyō Main Line
- Distance: 268.3 km (166.7 miles) from Kobe
- Platforms: 2 side platforms
- Tracks: 2
- Connections: Bus stop

Construction
- Accessible: Yes

Other information
- Status: Staffed
- Station code: JR-G11
- Website: Official website

History
- Opened: 1 October 1926

Passengers
- FY2019: 4949

Services
Preceding station	JR West	Following station
Saijō towards Hiroshima	San'yō Line Rapid	Shiraichi towards Itozaki
Saijō towards Hiroshima	San'yō Line Local	Shiraichi towards Itozaki
Location
- Location within Hiroshima Prefecture Location within Japan

Nishitakaya Station (西高屋駅, Nishitakaya-eki) is a passenger railway station located in the city of Higashihiroshima, Hiroshima Prefecture, Japan. It is operated by the West Japan Railway Company (JR West).

== Lines ==
Nishitakaya Station is served by the JR West Sanyō Main Line, and is located 268.3 kilometers from the terminus of the line at Kobe.

== Station layout ==
The station consists of two opposed side platforms connected by a footbridge. The station is staffed.

== Platforms ==
1	■ G Sanyō Main Line	for Mihara and Fukuyama
2	■ G Sanyō Main Line	for Saijō and Hiroshima

== History ==
Nishitakaya Station was opened on 13 July 1917 as Takaya Signal Stop (高屋信号場) . It was elevated to a station on 1 October 1926. With the privatization of the Japanese National Railways (JNR) on 1 April 1987, the station came under the control of JR West.

== Passenger statistics ==
In fiscal 2019, the station was used by an average of 4949 passengers daily.

== Surrounding area ==
- Kindai University Hiroshima Campus
- Hiroshima Prefectural Hiroshima Junior and Senior High School
- Kindai University Hiroshima High School/Junior High School Higashi-Hiroshima School
- Higashihiroshima Municipal Takamigaoka Junior High School

== See also ==
- List of railway stations in Japan
