= Habu (disambiguation) =

Habu is the common name of a number of species of venomous snakes.

Habu may also refer to:

- Chironex yamaguchii, a venomous box jellyfish, known in Japan as the habu kurage
- Habu, Botswana, a village
- HABU equivalent, a measure of computer performance
- Lockheed A-12, reconnaissance aircraft, as an early project nickname
- Lockheed SR-71 Blackbird, reconnaissance aircraft, as an early project nickname
- Yoshiharu Habu (born 1970), Japanese shogi player
- Mizuho Habu (born 1997), Japanese idol
