= Horikawa =

Horikawa (jap. 堀川/堀河, "canal") may refer to:

- Horikawa (surname), a Japanese surname
- Emperor Horikawa, emperor of Japan
- Horikawa, Kyoto, one of main streets in Kyoto, whereupon lie the Horikawa Mansion of both Emperor Horikawa, and later, Minamoto no Yoshitsune
- Hori River (Nagoya), known as Horikawa in Japanese
