= Higashi-Hiroshima Station =

Railway station in Higashihiroshima, Japan

Higashi-Hiroshima Station 東広島駅
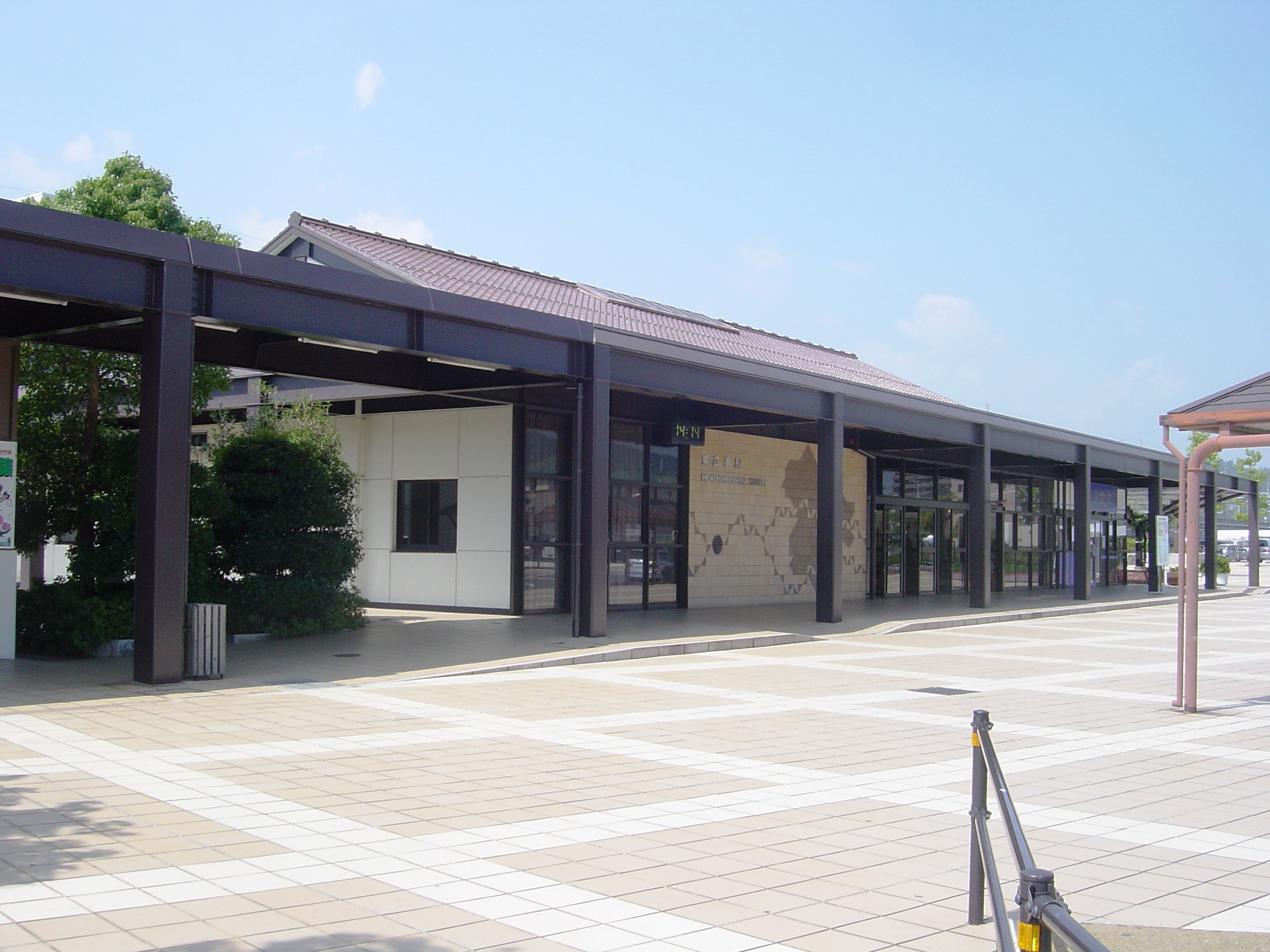

Japanese name
- Shinjitai: 東広島駅
- Kyūjitai: 東廣島驛
- Hiragana: ひがしひろしまえき

General information
- Location: 1-4-24 Minaga, Higashihiroshima City; Hiroshima Prefecture; Japan
- Coordinates: 34°23′22″N 132°45′35″E
- Operator: JR West
- Line: San'yō Shinkansen
- Platforms: 2 side platforms
- Tracks: 4 (2 bypass)

Construction
- Structure type: Elevated

Other information
- Website: Official website

History
- Opened: 13 March 1988; 38 years ago

Services
Preceding station	JR West	Following station
Hiroshima towards Hakata or Hakataminami	San'yō Shinkansen Kodama	Mihara towards Shin-Ōsaka
Location
- Location within Hiroshima Prefecture Location within Japan

Higashi-Hiroshima Station (東広島駅, Higashi-Hiroshima-eki; literally "East Hiroshima Station") is a railway station on the high-speed Sanyo Shinkansen in Higashihiroshima, Hiroshima, Japan, operated by West Japan Railway Company (JR West).

== Lines ==
Higashi-Hiroshima Station is served by the Sanyo Shinkansen from Shin-Osaka in the east to Hakata in the west. It is located 276.5 kilometers from Shin-Osaka and 791.9 kilometers from Tokyo.

== Station layout ==
The station has two side platforms serving two tracks, with two centre tracks for passing trains. The station has a "Midori no Madoguchi" staffed ticket office.

== Platforms ==
1	■ San'yō Shinkansen	for Hiroshima and Hakata
2	■ San'yō Shinkansen	for Okayama and Shin-Osaka

== Buses ==
Name	Via	Destination	Company	Note
Saijō・Takehara Line	Fujigran-mae	Saijō Station	Geiyo Bus
Saijō・Takehara Line	Yusaka Onsen・Nakadōri	Takehara Station	Geiyo Bus
Saijō・Akitsu・Takehara Line	Fujigran-mae	Saijō Station	Geiyo Bus
Saijō・Akitsu・Takehara Line		Akitsu Station (Hiroshima)	Geiyo Bus
Saijō・Akitsu・Takehara Line	Akitsu Station (Hiroshima)	Takehara Station	Geiyo Bus
Hiroshima Daigaku Line	Higashi-Hiroshima Undō Kōen	Hiroshima University	Geiyo Bus; Chūgoku JR Bus	Runs only on weekdays
Hiroshima Kokusai Daigaku Line	Ōsawa	Hiroshima International University	Chūgoku JR Bus
Hiroshima Kokusai Daigaku Line		Saijō Station	Chūgoku JR Bus

== History ==
Higashi-Hiroshima Station opened on 13 March 1988.

== See also ==
- List of railway stations in Japan
