= Hanazono Station =

Hanazono Station may refer to one of the following train stations in Japan:

- Fukaya Hanazono Station, in Saitama Prefecture
- Hanazono Station (Kagawa), in Kagawa Prefecture
- Hanazono Station (Kyoto), in Kyoto Prefecture
- Kawachi-Hanazono Station, in Osaka Prefecture
