= Hitachi 917 =

Biochemistry autoanalyser

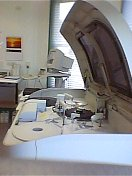
Side-on view of the Hitachi 917.

The Hitachi 917 is an automated biochemistry analyser utilised at medical laboratories to process biological fluid specimens, such as urine, cerebrospinal fluid, and most commonly, blood.

Manufactured by Boehringer Mannheim, the Hitachi 917 is a commonly used routine chemical bichromatic analyser. Capable of doing 1200 test/hour with ISE, it is a popular choice among small to medium size laboratories.

== Appearance and use ==
The 917 has two trays for racks, plus a stat rack. Racks that hold five test tubes slide in on the left side of the machine. There are two reagents carousels on the right side of the 917. In the centre, towards the back, are the reaction vessels, where the chemical reactions take place.

== Features at a glance ==
- Type:Chemistry Analyzer
- Parameters: 86 analytes
- Method: Spectrophotometric Method.
- Weight: 455 kilos
- W x D x H: 60x30x44 inches / 152x76x112 cm

== Tests available ==
- Ion selective electrodes (e.g. Na, K, Cl)
- Rate (e.g. creatine kinase)
- End point
- Immunoturbidity

== See also ==
- Medical technologist
