= Higashi Nakatsukasa =

Japanese samurai

Higashi Nakatsukasa (東 中務, 1835 - 1912) was a Japanese samurai of the late Edo period who served the Nanbu clan of the Morioka Domain. He was made a page in 1849 in service to Nanbu Toshiyoshi; five years later he became a karō, and led a reform program in the Morioka domainal administration. He was a colleague of the more famous Narayama Sado.
