= Hashima =

Hashima may refer to:

- Hashima, Gifu (羽島市), city in Gifu Prefecture, Japan
  - The Hashima meteorite of circa 1910, which landed in Hashima City (see meteorite falls)
- Hashima District, Gifu (羽島郡), a nearby district in Gifu Prefecture, Japan
- Hashima Island (端島) (nicknamed Gunkanjima, which translates to "Battleship Island"), an uninhabited island in Nagasaki Prefecture, Japan, formerly home to a coal mining facility
- Hasma, also known as Hashima, frog glands popular in Asia
