= Hototogisu =

Hototogisu may refer to:

- Lesser cuckoo (Cuculus poliocephalus), a bird native to Japan
- The Cuckoo (Japanese novel) or Hototogisu, a novel by Roka Tokutomi
- Hototogisu (magazine), a Japanese literary magazine
