= Horikawa (surname) =

Horikawa (written: 堀川 or 堀河) is a Japanese surname. Notable people with the surname include:

- Jin Horikawa (堀川 仁, born 1962), Japanese voice actor
- Kenji Horikawa (堀川 憲司, born 1965), Japanese anime producer
- Momoka Horikawa (堀川桃香, born 2003), Japanese speed skater
- Mayumi Horikawa (堀川 まゆみ, born 1958), Japanese model and singer-songwriter
- Ryō Horikawa (堀川 りょう, born 1958), Japanese actor and voice actor
- Toshihiro Horikawa (堀河 俊大, born 1989), Japanese footballer
