= The Hollow Doll =

1990 book by William Bohnaker

The Hollow Doll: A Little Box of Japanese Shocks
- Author: William Bohnaker
- Language: English
- Publisher: Ballantine Books
- Publication date: 1990

The Hollow Doll: A Little Box of Japanese Shocks is a 1990 book written by William Bohnaker and published by Ballantine Books.

The book is a sociological examination of Japan in terms of its culture and how it affects individual citizens. The book then goes into describing the "negative" aspects of Japanese society as a society that, unlike "The West" which functions on logic, Japanese society functions with a formulaic society.

And the book thus points out how it has many deficiencies and economic, civil, and social inequities underneath the polite, hardworking, and ceremonious veil of modern Japan.
