= Utako Hanazono =

Japanese geisha

Utako Hanazono Hanazono, Utako (花園歌子) (January 1905 – 1982) was a Japanese writer, modern dancer, geisha and a Japanese traditional dance master by the name of Tamae Hanazono at her later years.

== Biography ==
Hanazono was born in January 1905, educated at the Tokyo Women's Pharmaceutical School (a predecessor to Meiji Pharmaceutical University), and started working as a clerk at a pharmaceutical company before joining a leftist theater led by Shunkichi Kurose, her future husband. Hanazono's real name by marriage was Nao Kurose (黒瀬 直, Kurose Nao) who practiced then top notch modern dance at that troop, and joined a burlesque studio in Asakusa. It was in Shinbashi where Hanazono started as a geisha, soon to become popular as a modern geisha, a person with the background of modern dance. While she was hired at a geisha dispatch house under an indentured contract, Hanazono stayed with that house even after her tenure had expired.

She publicly criticized the Japanese government in the 1920s and 1930s for preventing geisha to take on other professions in order to earn a living. In her book "Geigitsū" Hanazono annoyed leading women's right activists Fukuda Hideko as well as Wakamatsu Shizuko by pointing out that many geisha were forced to turn to sex work in order to survive because of this law. She also challenged the social discrimination faced by geisha due to ancient social traditions and customs that they were still required to observe, including customary indentured servitude which had been bound with advance debt contracts. (Note: There is an observation that Hanazono's "Geigitsū" of 1930 was written by her husband Shunkichi Kurose.)

As a renowned book collector for the theme of geigi, Hanazono joined the Meiji Culture Study Group [ja] as an enthusiastic fan of the leader Sakuzō Yoshino, while exchanging views with another bibliophile Shōzō Saitō [ja]. Hanazono remarried with Iruru Hirai, a.k.a. Iruru Masaoka, in 1941, a researcher on traditional Japanese entertainment including rakugo and yose Japanese vaudeville.

In her latter years, she founded her own school of Hanazono of traditional Japanese dance, named herself their first Iemoto or the head master, with the name of Tamae Hanazono.

Hanazono wrote works about women's rights, criticizing Japan's patriarchal society, and studied modern dance.

== Bibliography ==
- "Geigitsū", Tōkyō: Shiroku Shoin, 1930. Vol.29, Tsū Sōsho Series, OCLC 674280562.
  - Reprint: "Geigitsu", Kora, Rumiko; Iwami, Teruyo (eds.), Yumani Shobo, 2004. Vol.II (Josei no mita kindai series), No. 4, Josei to rodo. ISBN 4843312215, 9784843312216, 4843312142, 9784843312148, OCLC 674397954. (Full text via Google Books.)
- "Onna kara ningen e — Josei bunka kenkyū shiryō ichiran" [From Woman to Human-being: List of Materials on Women's Culture Research], Tokyo : Ōsawa Tadashi, 1931. OCLC 673014976
