= Yuzuru Hanyuda =

Japanese skeleton racer (born 1976)

Yuzuru Hanyuda(羽入田 譲 born October 23, 1976) is a Japanese male skeleton racer, who took part in the 2005/2006 Skeleton World Cup trying to qualify for the 2006 Winter Olympics.

== World Cup 2005/2006 results ==
- 26th on November 10, 2005, Calgary CAN
- 26th on November 17, 2005, Lake Placid, New York, USA
