= Saijō Station =

Railway station in Higashihiroshima, Hiroshima Prefecture, Japan

Saijō Station 西条駅
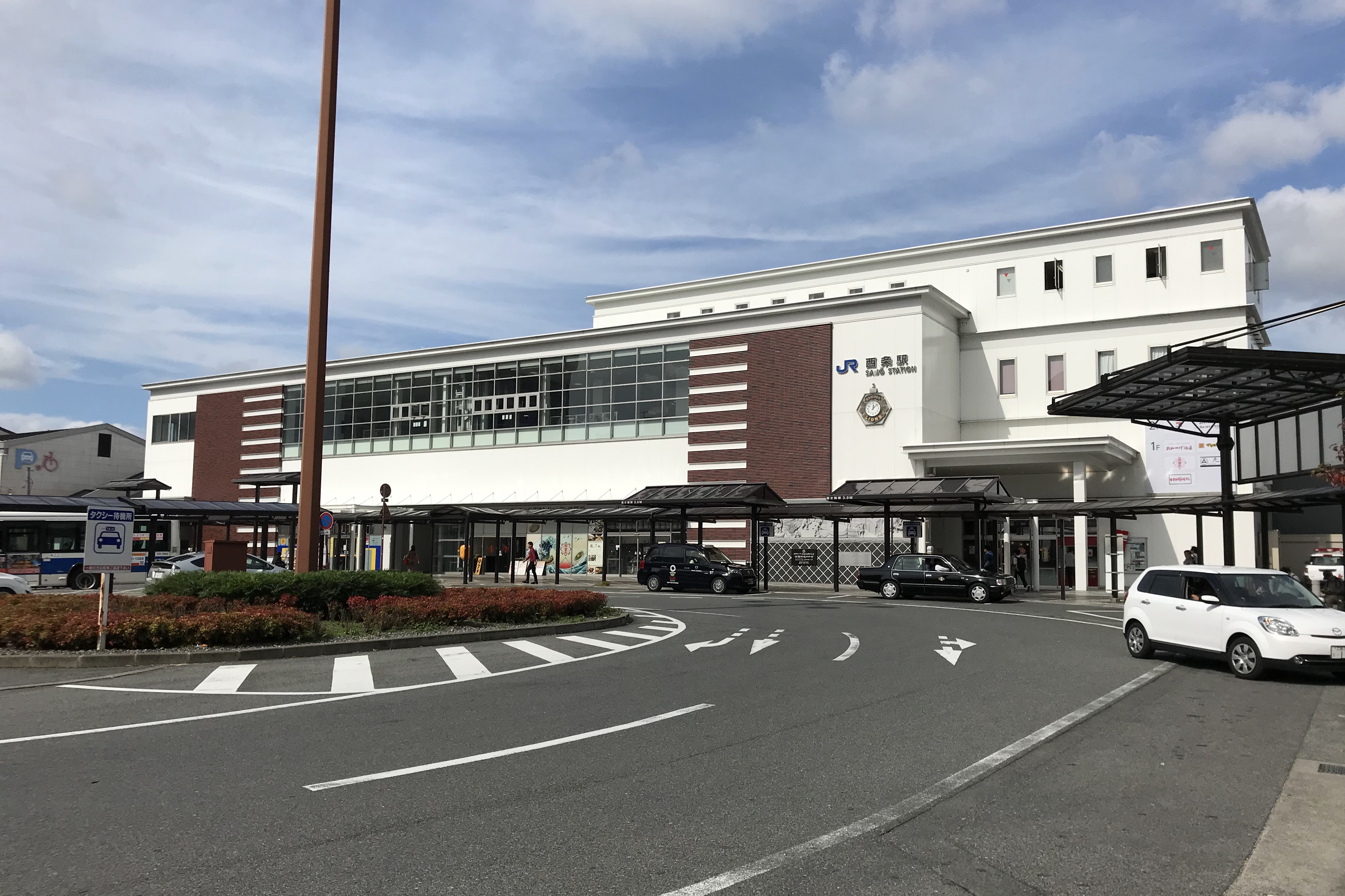
- Saijō Station in October 2019

General information
- Location: 12-3 Saijō, Saijōhon-cho, Higashihiroshima-shi, Hiroshima-ken 739-0001; Japan
- Coordinates: 34°25′52.8″N 132°44′37.1″E
- Owner: West Japan Railway Company
- Operator: West Japan Railway Company
- Line: G Sanyō Main Line
- Distance: 278.9 km (173.3 miles) from Kobe
- Platforms: 1 side + 1 island platform
- Tracks: 3
- Connections: Bus stop

Construction
- Accessible: Yes

Other information
- Status: Staffed
- Station code: JR-G10
- Website: Official website

History
- Opened: 4 April 1895

Passengers
- FY2019: 9488

Services
Preceding station	JR West	Following station
Jike towards Hiroshima	San'yō Line Rapid	Nishitakaya towards Itozaki
Jike towards Hiroshima	San'yō Line Local	Nishitakaya towards Itozaki
Hiroshima towards Shimonoseki	San'yō Line West Express Ginga	Mihara towards Osaka
Location
- Location within Hiroshima Prefecture Location within Japan

Saijō Station (西条駅, Saijō-eki) is a passenger railway station located in the city of Higashihiroshima, Hiroshima Prefecture, Japan. It is operated by the West Japan Railway Company (JR West).

== Lines ==
Saijō Station is served by the JR West Sanyō Main Line, and is located 272.9 kilometers from the terminus of the line at Kobe.

== Station layout ==
The station consists of one side platform and one island platform connected by an elevated station building. The station is staffed.

== Platforms ==
1, 3	■ G Sanyō Main Line	for Hiroshima and Iwakuni
4	■ G Sanyō Main Line	for Mihara and Fukuyama

== History ==
Saijō Station was opened on 10 June 1894. With the privatization of the Japanese National Railways (JNR) on 1 April 1987, the station came under the control of JR West.

== Passenger statistics ==
In fiscal 2019, the station was used by an average of 9488 passengers daily.

== Surrounding area ==
- Higashihiroshima City Hall
- Hiroshima University Higashi-Hiroshima Campus
- Hiroshima Prefectural Kamo High School
- Hiroshima Prefectural Saijo Agricultural High School
- Saijo Central Hospital

== See also ==
- List of railway stations in Japan
