= Saijō =

Saijō or Saijo may refer to:

- Saijō (surname), a Japanese surname
- Saijō, Ehime, is a city in Ehime Prefecture, Japan
  - Iyo-Saijō Station, a railway station in Saijō, Ehime
- Saijō, Hiroshima (Kamo), a former town in Kamo District, Hiroshima Prefecture, Japan
  - Saijō Sake Matsuri, a festival held in Saijō, Hiroshima (Kamo)
- Saijō, Hiroshima (Shōbara), a former town in Hiba District, Hiroshima, Japan
- Saijō Station, a railway station in Higashihiroshima, Hiroshima Prefecture, Japan
- Bingo-Saijō Station, a railway station in Ōsa, Saijō-chō, Shōbara, Hiroshima Prefecture, Japan
