= Conservation techniques for cultural properties =

In 1975 the Japanese government added a new chapter to the Law for the Protection of Cultural Properties (1950) to provide for "traditional techniques or craftsmanship that are indispensable to the preservation of cultural property and for which preservation measures shall be taken". Preservation techniques are selected in relation to both tangible and intangible cultural properties and a holder or preservation body is recognized for each technique.

In support of the selected conservation techniques (選定保存技術), the government provides funding for and conducts programmes relating to documentation, training, development, promotion and public education. Recognition is thus made and measures taken to combat some of the most serious conservation issues, namely the lack of specialist craftsmen, the loss of knowledge of traditional techniques, and the availability of suitable tools and materials. These issues are of particular relevance in Japan due to the sophistication and inherent susceptibility of much of its art and architecture.

The list below is compiled from the database of cultural properties maintained by the Agency for Cultural Affairs, with translations, glosses and listed holders (as of 2004) following those published by the Asia/Pacific Cultural Centre for UNESCO (ACCU).

== Selected conservation techniques ==
=== Tangible cultural properties ===
48 techniques

Name	Remarks	Holder	Year	Picture
Casting production (鋳物製作, imono seisaku)		Individual (Shūichi Otani, b. 1933)	1999	
Ukiyo-e woodblock art techniques (浮世絵木版画技術, ukiyo-e mokuhanga gijutsu)		Group	1978	
Crafting of decorative metal fittings (錺金具製作, kazari kanagu seisaku)		Individual (Yasunosuke Morimoto, b. 1928)	1998	
Restoration of armour (甲冑修理, katchū shūri)		Individual (Masami Ozawa, b. 1953 and Fumio Nishioka)	1998 and 2022	
Gathering sedge used for thatching (茅採取, kayasaishu)		Group (Japan Thatching Cultural Association)	2018	
Roofing with thatch (茅葺, kayabuki)		Joint (Ryōzō Sumida, b. 1926; National Organization for Conservation of Roofing Techniques for Temples and Shrines)	1980	
Production of karakami paper (唐紙製作, karakami seisaku)		Individual (Kenkichi Senda, b. 1942)	1999	
Production of gold and silver yarn and foil (金銀糸・平箔製作, kinginshi hirahaku seisaku)		Individual (Yūji Torihara)	2017	
Lacquer coating of buildings (建造物漆塗, kenzōbutsu urushi-nuri)		Joint (Nikkō Shrine Temples Cultural Property Preservation Society; individual also)	2016	
Buildings colouration (建造物彩色, kenzōbutsu saishiki)		Joint (Ryōji Baba, Organization for Conserving Cultural Properties Related to Shrines and Temples of Nikkō	1979 and 2014	
Building restoration (建造物修理, kenzōbutsu shūri)		Group (Association of Conservation Techniques for Cultural Property Buildings)	1976	
Building decoration (建造物装飾, kenzōbutsu sōshoku)		Group	2007	
Woodwork for building (建造物木工, kenzōbutsu mokkō)		Joint (Shoji Matsuura, b. 1929; Association of Conservation Techniques for Cultural Property Buildings)	1976	
Production of silk (在来絹製作, zairai kinu seisaku)		Individual (Akira Shimura)	2021	
Plastering (Japanese walls) (左官 (日本壁), sakan (nihon kabe))		Group	2002	
Heddle production (時代裂用綜絖製作, jidaigireyō sōkō seisaku)		Individual (Tsuyoshi Kamei)	2018	
Restoration of lacquer wares (漆工品修理, shikkōhin shūri)		Individual (Kenichi Kitamura, b. 1938)	1994	
Crafting and restoration of metal fittings of Jōdai ornaments (上代飾金具製作修理, jōdai kazari kanagu seisaku shūri)	Includes mikoshi, zushi	Individual (Sōtaro Kanae, b. 1908)	1977	
Stone tile roofing (石盤葺, sekibanbuki)		Individual (Shinpei Sasaki)	2005	
Traditional framing and mounting techniques (装潢修理技術, sōkō shūri gijutsu)		Group (Federation of National Treasure Framers and Restorers)	1995	
Production of nails made of bamboo (竹釘製作, takekugi seisaku)		Individual (Yoshiharu Ishizuka, b. 1922)	1998	
Manufacture of tatami (畳製作, tatami seisaku)		Individual	1929	
Making of traditional fittings such as sliding doors (建具製作, tategu seisaku)	Includes shōji, fusuma, amado	Individual (Tadashi Suzuki, b. 1936)	1999	
Manufacture and repair of sword fittings (scabbard) (刀装（鞘）製作修理, tōsō (saya) seisaku shūri)		Individual (Kazuyuki Takayama)	2018	
Manufacture of decorative arts metal jewellery and fittings (美術工芸品錺金具製作, bijutsukōgeihin kazari kanagu seisaku)		Individual (Kiyoshi Matsuda)	2019	
Manufacture of boxes made of paulownia wood for containing art and craft objects (美術工芸品保存桐箱製作, bijutsu kōgeihin hozon kiribako seisaku)		Individual (Yūichi Maeda, b. 1927)	1980	
Manufacture of decorative arts boxes (braids) (美術工芸品保存箱紐（真田紐）製作, bijutsukōgeihin hozon hakohima (sanadahimo) seisaku)		Individual (Tōichi Ichimura)	2021	
Production of brushes for mounting (表具用打刷毛製作, hyōguyō uchibake seisaku)		Individual (Genjirō Hujii, b. 1920)	1998	
Manufacture of ancient textiles (such as gold brocade) for mounting (表具用古代裂 (金襴等) 製作, hyōgu-yō kodai-gire (kinran tō) seisaku)	For kakemono etc.	Individual	2007	
Production of Udagami handmade paper for mounting on sliding doors (表具用手漉和紙 (宇陀紙) 製作, hyōguyō tesuki washi (udagami) seisaku)	washi	Individual (Hiroyuki Hukunishi, b. 1930)	1978	
Production of Hoshū handmade paper for mounting (表具用手漉和紙 (補修紙) 製作, hyōguyō tesuki washi (hoshūshi) seisaku)	washi	Individual	2007	
Production of Misugami handmade paper for mounting (表具用手漉和紙 (美栖紙) 製作, hyōguyō tesuki washi (misugami) seisaku)	washi	Individual	2009	
Manufacture of brushes for mounting (表具用刷毛製作, hyōguyō hage seisaku)		Individual	1958	
Manufacture of wooden picture mountings (表具用木製軸首製作, hyōgu yōmoku seijikushu seisaku)		Individual (Shigemi Hanawa)	2021	
Lacquer coating of mountings (polished black lacquerware) (表装漆塗（呂色塗）, hyōsō uroshi-nuri (roiroi-nuri))		Individual (Ikū Shinki)	2022	
Weavings of mountings (表装裂製作, hyōsō gire seisaku)		Group	2023	
Joinery for mounting (表装建具製作, hyōsō tategu seisaku)		Individual	1995	
Gathering Japanese cypress bark (檜皮採取, hiwada saishiki)		Individual (Yutaka Ono, b. 1934)	1999	
Roof-thatching using Japanese cypress bark or boards (檜皮葺・柿葺, hiwada-buki/kokera-buki)	cf. shake roofing	Joint (Yasuo Onishi, b. 1925; National Organization for Conservation of Roofing Techniques for Temples and Shrines)	1976	
Conservation techniques for Cultural Property dry stone walls (文化財石垣保存技術, bunkazai ishigaki hozon gijutsu)		Group	2009	
Conservation techniques for gardens designated as Cultural Properties (文化財庭園保存技術, bunkazai teien hozon gijutsu)		Group	2002	
Dyeing with true indigo (本藍染, hon aizome)		Individual (Yoshio Mori, b. 1941)	1996	
Production and repair of festival floats (祭屋台等製作修理, matsuri yataitō seisaku shūri)		Group (Association of Holders of Festival Floats Production and Repair Techniques	2002	
Restoration of wooden sculptures (木造彫刻修理, mokuzō chōkoku-shūri)		Group (Bijutsu-in Art Institute)	1976	
Woodwork restoration (木工品修理, mokkohin shūri)		Individual (Hiroshi Sakurai, b. 1950)	1997	
Production of shingles (屋根板製作, yaneita seisaku)		Joint (Mitsuhiro Kuriyama)	2011	
Roofing with roofing tiles (屋根瓦葺 (本瓦葺), yanegawarabuki (hongawarabuki))		Joint (Kiyokazu Yamamoto, b. 1932; Mitsuo Teramoto, b. 1946; group also)	1994	
Kiku-jutsu techniques for marking when constructing wooden building (modern) (規矩術 (近世規矩), kiku-jutsu (kinsei-kiku))	lit. "measuring with a carpenter's square"	Individual (Takeo Mochida, b. 1931)	1993	

=== Intangible cultural properties ===
30 techniques

Name	Remarks	Holder	Year	Picture
Awa indigo production (阿波藍製造, Awa ai seizō)		Group (Organization for Conserving Awa Indigo Production Techniques)	1978	
Smoked plum production (烏梅製造, ubai seizō)		Individual (Yoshihisa Nakanishi)	2011	
Production of tools for lacquer gathering (漆掻き用具製作, urushi kakiyōgu seisaku)		Individual (Humitoshi Nakahata, b. 1943)	1995	
Production of Yoshino-gami paper for filtering lacquer (漆濾紙 (吉野紙) 製作, urushi koshigami (Yoshino gami) seisaku)		Individual (Takao Konbu, b. 1951)	1999	
Production of brushes for lacquer (漆刷毛製作, urushi bake seisaku)		Individual (Seiji Izumi, b. 1950)	1998	
Crafting and restoration of wind instruments for gagaku music (雅楽管楽器製作修理, gagaku kangakki seisaku shūri)		Individual (Yasuhiko Hukuda, b. 1926; Zenichi Yamada, b. 1934)	1976	
Crafting and restoration of string instruments for gagaku music (wagon and koto) (雅楽弦楽器（和琴・箏）製作修理, gagaku gengakki (wagon sō) seisaku shūri)		Individual (Makio Ogawa)	2014	
Kabuki stage costume production and restoration (歌舞伎衣裳製作修理, kabuki ishō seisaku shūri)		Group (Association for Conservation of Kabuki Stage Costume Production and Restoration)	2002	
Kabuki stage set (scenery painting) production (歌舞伎大道具 (背景画) 製作, kabuki ōdōgu (haikeiga) seisaku)		Group (Organization for Conserving Kabuki Stage Set Production Techniques)	2002	
Kabuki wig production (歌舞伎鬘製作, kabuki katsura seisaku)		Group (Organization for Conserving Kabuki Stage Set Production Techniques)	2020	
Kabuki stage properties production (歌舞伎小道具製作, kabuki kodōgu seisaku)		Group (Organization for Conserving Kabuki Stage Properties Production Techniques)	1996	
Hair styling for kabuki theatre (歌舞伎床山, kabuki tokoyama)		Individual (Toshikazu Kamoji, b. 1938)	2003	
Karamushi plant production (からむし (苧麻) 生産・苧引き, karamushi (choma) seisan - obiki)	ramie	Group (Shōwa-mura Karamushi Production Techniques Conservation Association)	1991	
Kumi Odori tools and costume production and restoration (組踊道具・衣裳製作修理, kumiodori dōgu - ishō seisaku shūri)		Group	2009	
Natural dyestuffs (safflower and gromwell) production (植物染料 (紅・紫根) 生産・製造, shokubutsu senryō (behi - shikon) seisan - seizō)		Group (Japanese Association for Conserving Ethnic Craft Techniques)	1979	
Production of steel used for making Japanese swords (玉鋼製造, tamahagane seizō)	tamahagane	Group (Japanese Association for Conserving Art Swords)	1977	
Traditional steel-refining (tatara-buki) (玉鋼製造 (たたら吹き), tamahagane seizō (tatara-buki))		Individual (Akira Kihara, b. 1935; Katsuhiko Watanabe, b. 1939)	1977	
Choma thread twisting (苧麻糸手績み, choma ito teumi)		Group (Miyako Organization for Conserving Bunmi Techniques)	2003	
Production of tools for paper making (手漉和紙用具製作, tesuki washi yōgu seisaku)	washi	Group (National Organization for Conserving Production Techniques of Tools for Traditional Paper Making)	1976	
Loom building (手機製作, tebata seisaku)		Individual (Tawaichi Nishimura, b. 1937)	2003	
Special charcoal for polishing lacquer or metal handicrafts (研炭製造, togizumi seizō)		Individual (Asatarō Higashi, b. 1921)	1994	
Production and refining of Japanese lacquer (日本産漆生産・精製, Nihon san urushi seisan - seisei)		Group (Japanese Association of Lacquer for Cultural Properties; Japanese Organization for Conserving Lacquer Gathering Techniques)	1976	
Crafting of drumheads for Ōtsuzumi drums used in nohgaku (能楽大鼓 (革) 製作, nōgaku ōtsuzumi kawa seisaku)		Individual (Yukihiko Kimura, b. 1929)	1976	
Crafting of kotsuzumi drums and drumheads for nohgaku (能楽小鼓 (胴・革) 製作修理, nōgaku kotsuzumi dōkawa seisaku shūri)		Individual (Satoyuki Suzuki, b. 1936)	1995	
Production of noh costumes (能装束製作, nōshōzoku seisaku)		Individual (Yōji Sasaki)	2020	
Crafting and restoration of biwa (琵琶製作修理, biwa seisaku shūri)		Individual	2006	
Production of strings for Japanese stringed instruments (邦楽器糸製作, hōgaki ito seisaku)	for shamisen, koto, wagon, biwa	Individual (Hiroyuki Ozasa, b. 1924)	1979	
Production of strings for Japanese musical instruments (邦楽器原糸製造, hotsugakki genshi seizō)		Group (Kino-honcho Town Organization for Conserving Production of Strings for Japanese Traditional Musical Instruments; Asai-cho Town Organization for Conserving Production of Strings for Japanese Traditional Musical Instruments)	1991	
Production of brushes for gold/silver lacquer painting (蒔絵筆製作, makie fude seisaku)	for maki-e	Individual (Kurōbei Murata, b. 1915)	1987	
Ryūkyū indigo dyestuffs production (琉球藍製造, Ryūkyū ai seizō)		Joint (Seishō Inowa, b. 1927; Organization for Conserving Ryūkyū Indigo Production Techniques)	1977	

=== Intangible and tangible cultural properties ===
5 techniques

Name	Remarks	Holder	Year	Picture
Production of tools for printing and colouring (上絵具製造, uwaenogu seizō)		Individual (Hitoyuki Tsuji)	2017	
Production of entsuke gold leaf (縁付金箔製造, entsuke kenpaku seizō)		Group (Society for the preservation of traditional Kanazawa gold leaf)	2014	
Production of bamboo weeds (竹筬製作, takeosa seizō)		Group	2017	
Production of tools for noodle making (手打針製作, teuchi-bara seizō)		Individual (Kyoko Kojima)	2018	
Production of charcoal (木炭製造, mokutan seizō)		Group	2014	

== See also ==
- Cultural Properties of Japan
- Intangible Cultural Properties of Japan
- Conservation-restoration
