= Saijō, Hiroshima =

Saijō, Hiroshima may refer to:

- Saijō, Hiroshima (Shōbara)
- Saijō, Hiroshima (Kamo)
