= Reizō =

- Gender: Male

Origin
- Origin: Japanese
- Meaning: Different meanings depending on the kanji used

Reizō, Reizo or Reizou (written: 礼三, 禮三 or 黎三) is a masculine Japanese given name. Notable people with the name include:

- Reizo Fukuhara (福原 黎三; 1931–1970), Japanese footballer
- Reizo Koike (小池 禮三; 1915–1998), Japanese swimmer
- Reizō Nomoto (野本 礼三; 1930–2006), Japanese voice actor
