= Kurose, Hiroshima =

Kurose 黒瀬町
- Town
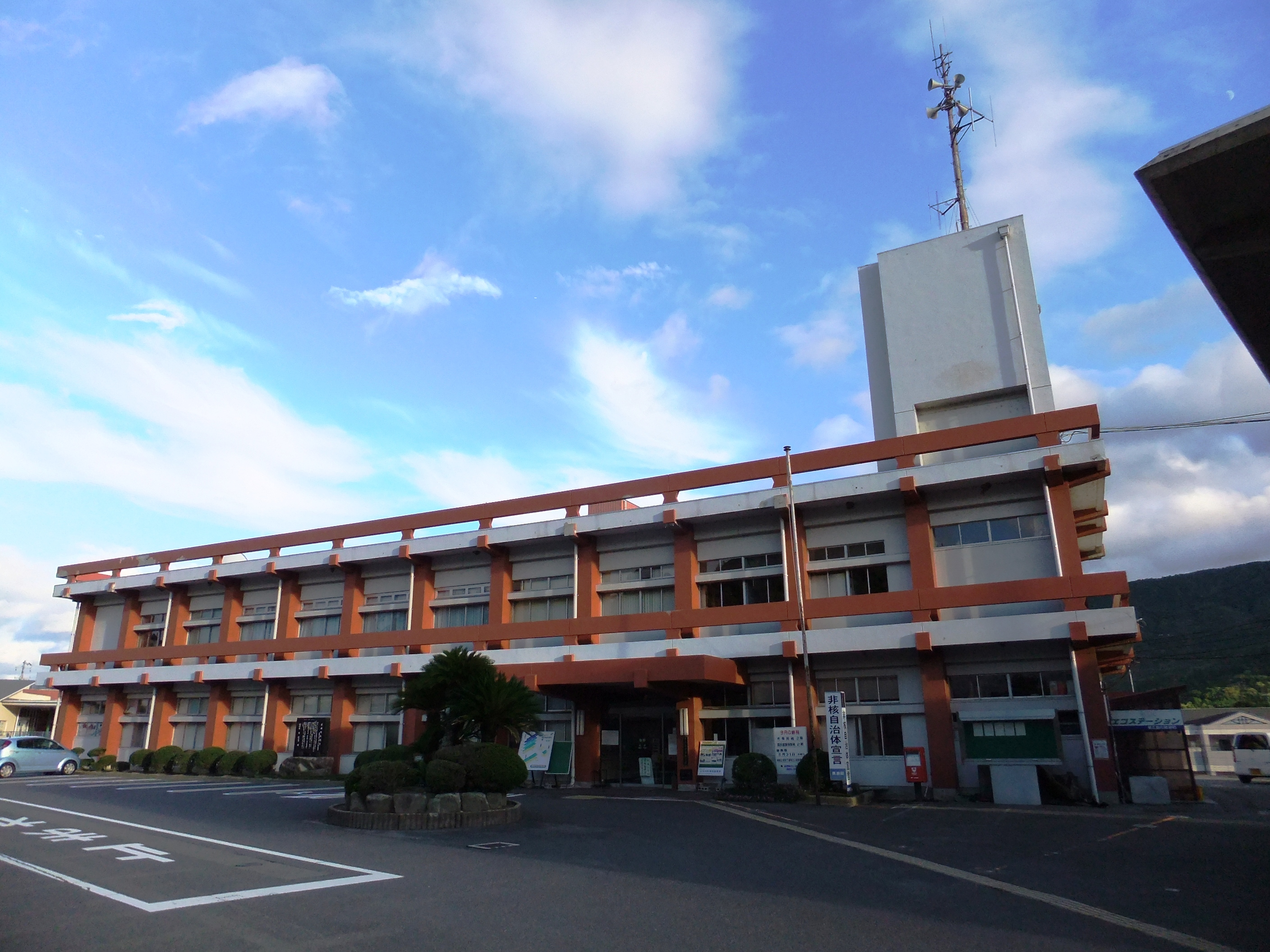

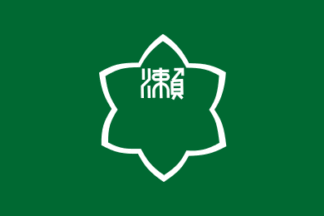
- Flag
- Interactive map of Kurose
- Country: Japan
- Prefecture: Hiroshima
- District: Kamo

Area
  - Total: 63.84 km^{2} (24.65 sq mi)

Population (2003)
  - Total: 25,294
  - Density: 396.21/km^{2} (1,026.2/sq mi)
- Time zone: UTC+09:00 (JST)

Kurose (黒瀬町, Kurose-chō) was a town located in Kamo District, Hiroshima Prefecture, Japan.

As of 2003, the town had an estimated population of 25,294 and a density of 396.21 persons per km^{2}. The total area was 63.84 km^{2}.

On February 7, 2005, Kurose, along with the towns of Fukutomi, Kōchi and Toyosaka (all from Kamo District), and the town of Akitsu (from Toyota District), was merged into the expanded city of Higashihiroshima and no longer exists as an independent municipality.
