= Fukutomi =

Fukutomi (written: 福冨 or 福富) may refer to:

- Hiroshi Fukutomi (福冨 博) (born 1950), Japanese anime director
- Tsuki Fukutomi (福富 つき) (born 2002), Japanese singer, member of girl group Billlie
- Fukutomi, Hiroshima (福富町, Fukutomi-chō), former town in Kamo District, Hiroshima Prefecture, Japan
