= Saijō Sake Matsuri =

Saijō Sake Matsuri 西条酒まつり
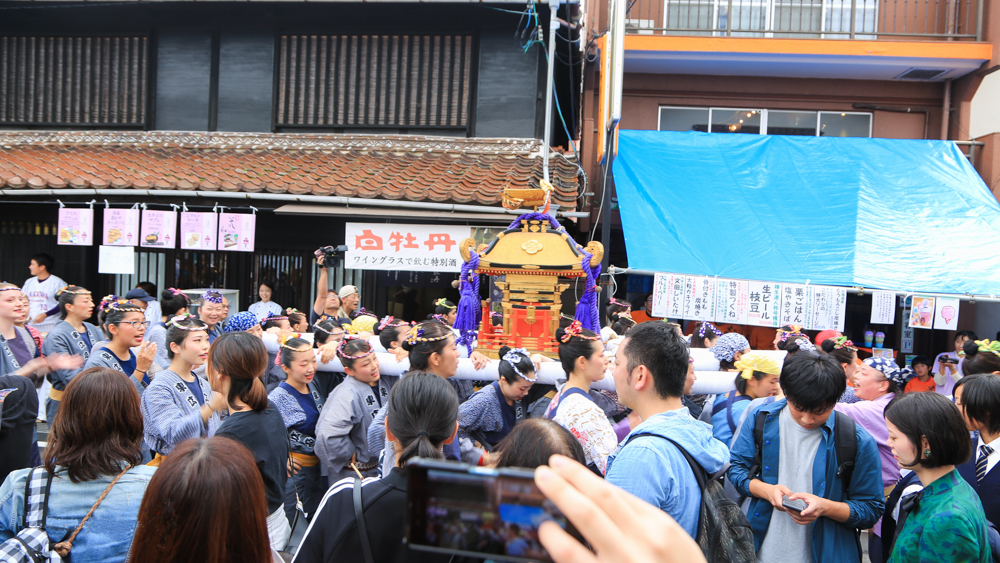
- Saijō Sake Matsuri
- Genre: Sake (rice wine) matsuri festival
- Date: October
- Frequency: Annually
- Location: Saijō Higashihiroshima
- Country: Japan
- Attendance: 100,000–200,000
- Major events: Attractions, sidestalls and games
- Website: Official website (in Japanese)

The Saijō Sake Festival (西条酒まつり, Saijō Sake Matsuri) is a sake (rice wine) matsuri festival held annually in Saijō Higashihiroshima, Hiroshima Prefecture, Japan.

Saijō is famed for local sake or Saijō Sake. Within the narrow streets of the Sakagura Dori ("Sake Storehouse Road") area near JR Saijō Station are the Namako wall (white-lattice walled) and Sekishu Gawara (red-roof tile) roofs of ten well-known sake breweries; Chiyonoharu, Fukubijin, Hakubotan, Kamoki, Kamoizumi, Kamotsuru, Kirei, Saijotsuru, Sakurafubuki, and Sanyotsuru. In July 1995, Saijō was made the home of the Brewery Laboratory of the National Tax Office.

The Saijō Sake Matsuri is an important part of Hiroshima culture, which draws crowds of between 100,000 and 200,000 revelers and sake connoisseurs each October before the brewing season (October–March) begins. Visitors also enjoy numerous attractions, sidestalls and games. There is also a wide variety of traditional as well as modern carnival food available.
