= Toyosaka =

Toyosaka can refer to:

- Toyosaka, Hiroshima
- Toyosaka, Niigata
- Toyosaka Station
