= Kamo District, Hiroshima =

Former district in Hiroshima prefecture, Japan

Kamo (賀茂郡, Kamo-gun) was a district located in Hiroshima Prefecture, Japan.

On March 22, 2005, the town of Daiwa, along with the town of Hongō (from Toyota District), and the town of Kui (from Mitsugi District), was merged into the expanded city of Mihara. Kamo District was dissolved as a result of this merger.

The district is now consisted of the areas of Aki-ku of the city of Hiroshima, Kure, Takehara, Higashihiroshima and Mihara.

== Municipalities (as of the 1889 municipal status enforcement) ==
- Aga (阿賀村)
- Itaki (板城村)
- Uchinoumi (内海村)
- Uchinoumiato (内海跡村)
- Kanaga (賀永村)
- Kamikurose (上黒瀬村)
- Kawakami (川上村)
- Kawajiri (川尻村)
- Kumanoato (熊野跡村)
- Gōda (郷田村)
- Gōhara (郷原村)
- Shitami (下見村)
- Shimoichi (下市村)
- Shimokurose (下黒瀬村)
- Shimono (下野村)
- Shimominaga (下三永村)
- Shōno (荘野村)
- Shiwahori (志和堀村)
- Zōga (造賀村)
- Teranishi (寺西村)
- Nakagiri (中切村)
- Nakakurose (中黒瀬村)
- Nigata (仁方村)
- Nishishiwa (西志和村)
- Nishitakaya (西高屋村)
- Nominoo (乃美尾村)
- Noro (野路村)
- Hayatahara (早田原村)
- Hara (原村)
- Higashishiwa (東志和村)
- Higashitakaya (東高屋村)
- Higashino (東野村)
- Hiro (広村)
- Misonou (御薗宇村)
- Mitsu (三津村)
- Mitsuguchi (三津口村)
- Yoshikawa (吉川村)
- Yoshitomi (吉土実村)
- Yokkaichijirōmaru (四日市次郎丸村)

(Total of 39 villages)

== Timeline (April 1, 1889~March 31, 1956) ==
- April 1, 1889 - Municipal status enforcement. They were 39 villages within the district.
- April 17, 1889 - The village of Shimoichi was renamed and elevated to town status to become the town of Takehara (1 town, 38 villages).
- October 1, 1890 - The village of Yokkaichijirōmaru was renamed and elevated to town status to become the town of Saijō (2 towns, 37 villages).
- April 12, 1893 - The village of Mitsu was elevated to town status to become the town of Mitsu (3 towns, 36 villages).
- January 1, 1896 - The village of Uchinoumi was elevated to town status to become the town of Uchinoumi (4 towns, 35 villages).
- May 1, 1897 - The village of Aga was elevated to town status to become the town of Aga (5 towns, 34 villages).
- January 1, 1907 - The village of Nigata was elevated to town status to become the town of Nigata (6 towns, 33 villages).
- January 1, 1922 - The village of Kawajiri was elevated to town status to become the town of Kawajiri (7 towns, 32 villages).
- January 1, 1922 - The town of Mitsuguchi was elevated to town status to become the town of Mitsuguchi (8 towns, 31 villages).
- April 1, 1928 - The city of Kure absorbed the town of Aga, and the towns of Kegoya and Yoshiura (both from Aki District) (7 towns, 31 villages).
- January 1, 1929 - The village of Uchinoumiato was renamed as the village of 安登村.
- July 1, 1939 - The town of Saijō absorbed the villages of Shitami, Misonou, Yoshitomi and Teranishi to create the town of Saijō (7 towns, 27 villages).
- April 21, 1941 - The village of Kure absorbed the town of Nigata, and the village of Hiro (6 towns, 26 villages).
- April 1, 1942 - The villages of Nakagiri and Noro were merged to create the village of Noro (6 towns, 25 villages).
- January 1, 1943 - The town of Mitsu, and the village of Hayatahara were merged with the village of Kidani (from Toyota District) to create the town of Akitsu (6 towns, 24 villages).
- January 1, 1944 - The towns of Uchinoumi and Mitsuguchi, and the village of Noro were merged to create the town of Yasuura (5 towns, 23 villages).
- April 1, 1950 - The localities of Saijōhigashi and Teraie (within the town of Saijō) were split from Saijō to become the village of Teranishi (5 towns, 24 villages).
- June 10, 1950 - The village of Zōga absorbed the village of Tono (from Toyota District).
- March 1, 1951 - The village of Kumanoato was moved to Aki District (5 towns, 23 villages. Later the town merged into the city of Hiroshima on November 1, 1974)
- April 1, 1952 - The town of Takehara absorbed the village of Shimono to create the town of Takehara (5 towns, 22 villages).
- April 1, 1952 - The village of Teranishi was elevated to town status to become the town of Teranishi (6 towns, 21 villages).
- March 31, 1954 - The villages of Nishitakaya and Higashitakaya were merged to create the village of Takaya (6 towns, 20 villages).
- March 31, 1954 - The villages of Kamikurose, Shimokurose, Nakakurose and Nominoo were merged to create the town of Kurose (7 towns, 16 villages).
- March 31, 1954 - The town of Takehara absorbed the village of Higashino and the village of Ōnori and parts of the village of Minamigata (all from Toyota District) (7 towns, 15 villages).
- January 1, 1955 - The town of Saijō absorbed the localities of Shimominaga and Kamiminaga from the village of Kanaga (7 towns, 14 villages).
- March 31, 1955 - The town of Takehara absorbed the village of Shōno, and the village of Tamari (from Toyota District) were to create the town of Takehara (7 towns, 13 villages).
- March 31, 1955 - The town of Kurose absorbed the locality 小多田・国近 from the village of Itaki.
- March 31, 1955 - The town of Saijō absorbed the villages of Gōda and Itaki (excluding 小多田・国近). At this point, the village of Itaki dissolved (7 towns, 11 villages).
- March 31, 1955 - The village of Takaya absorbed the village of 小谷村 (from Toyota District) and was elevated to town status to become the town of Takaya (8 towns, 10 villages).
- August 1, 1955 - The villages of Shiwahori, Nishishiwa and Higashishiwa were merged to form the town of Shiwa (9 towns, 7 villages).

== As of March 31, 1956 (before the change to the municipalities within both Kamo and Toyota Districts) ==
- Akitsu (安芸津町) → Moved to Toyota District (merged into the city of Higashihiroshima on February 7, 2005)
- Kawajiri (川尻町) → Moved to Toyota District (merged into the city of Kure on April 1, 2004)
- Kurose (黒瀬町) → Remained in Kamo District
- Saijō (西条町) → Remained in Kamo District
- Shiwa (志和町) → Remained in Kamo District
- Takaya (高屋町) → Remained in Kamo District
- Takehara (竹原町) → Moved to Toyota District (merged with the town of Tadanoumi, Toyota District on November 11, 1958, and moved to the city of Takehara)
- Teranishi (寺西町) → Remained in Kamo District
- Yasuura (安浦町) → Moved to Toyota District (merged into the city of Kure on March 20, 2005)
- Ato (安登村) → Moved to Toyota District (split and merged into the towns of Kawajiri and Yasuura, Toyota District, on April 1, 1958, and dissolved)
- Kanaga (賀永村) → Moved to Toyota District (split and merged into the town of Saijō, Kamo District, and the town of Takehara, Toyota District, on September 30, 1956, and dissolved)
- Kawakami (川上村) → Remained in Kamo District
- Gōhara (郷原村) → Remained in Kamo District
- Zōga (造賀村) → Remained in Kamo District
- Hara (原村) → Remained in Kamo District
- Yoshikawa (吉川村) → Remained in Kamo District

(Total of 9 towns, 7 villages)

== As of April 1, 1956 (after the change to the municipalities within both Kamo and Toyota Districts) ==
- Kurose (黒瀬町)
- Kōchi (河内町)
- Saijō (西条町)
- Shiwa (志和町)
- Daiwa (大和町)
- Takaya (高屋町)
- Teranishi (寺西町)
- Toyosaka (豊栄町)
- Fukutomi (福富町)
- Kawakami (川上村)
- Gōhara (郷原村)
- Zōga (造賀村)
- Nyūno (入野村)
- Hara (原村)
- Yoshikawa (吉川村)

(Total of 9 towns, 6 villages)

== Timeline (April 1, 1956~March 22, 2005) ==
- April 1, 1956 - 4 towns and 1 village within Toyota District moved to Kamo District, while 4 towns and 2 villages within Kamo District moved to Toyota District. At this time, the district had 9 towns and 6 villages.
- September 1, 1956 - The villages of Kawakami, Hara and Yoshikawa were merged to create the town of Hachihonmatsu (10 towns, 3 villages).
- September 30, 1956 - The town of Kōchi absorbed the village of Nyūno (10 towns, 2 villages).
- September 30, 1956 - The town of Saijō absorbed parts of the locality of Nika from the village of Kanaga (the remaining parts merged into the town of Takehara).
- October 1, 1956 - The city of Kure absorbed the village of Gōhara, the town of Tennō, and the village of Shōwa (from Aki District) (10 towns, 1 village).
- January 1, 1958 - The town of Takaya absorbed the village of Zōga (10 towns).
- October 1, 1959 - The town of Saijō absorbed the town of Teranishi (9 towns).
- April 20, 1974 - The towns of Saijō, Shiwa, Takaya and Hachihonmatsu were merged to create the city of Higashihiroshima (5 towns).
- February 7, 2005 - The towns of Fukutomi, Kurose, Kōchi and Toyosaka, along with the town of Akitsu (from Toyota District) were merged into the expanded city of Higashihiroshima (1 town).
- March 22, 2005 - The town of Daiwa, along with the town of Hongō (from Toyota District), and the town of Kui (from Mitsugi District), was merged into the expanded city of Mihara. Kamo District was dissolved as a result of this merger.

== See also ==
- List of dissolved districts of Japan
- Kamo District, Niigata
- Kamo District, Shizuoka
- Kamo District, Gifu
- Kamo District, Mikawa
- Higashikamo District, Aichi
- Nishikamo District, Aichi
