= Kōchi, Hiroshima =

Kōchi 河内町
- Town
- Flag Emblem
- Interactive map of Kōchi
- Country: Japan
- Prefecture: Hiroshima
- District: Kamo
- Merged: February 7, 2005 (now part of Higashihiroshima)

Area
  - Total: 84.68 km^{2} (32.70 sq mi)

Population (2003)
  - Total: 6,712
  - Density: 79.26/km^{2} (205.3/sq mi)
- Time zone: UTC+09:00 (JST)
- Website: Official website

Kōchi (河内町, Kōchi-chō) was a town located in Kamo District, Hiroshima Prefecture, Japan.

As of 2003, the town had an estimated population of 6,712 and a density of 79.26 persons per km^{2}. The total area was 84.68 km^{2}.

On February 7, 2005, Kōchi, along with the towns of Fukutomi, Kurose and Toyosaka (all from Kamo District), and the town of Akitsu (from Toyota District), was merged into the expanded city of Higashihiroshima and no longer exists as an independent municipality.
