= Toyota District, Hiroshima =

District in Hiroshima Prefecture, Japan

Coordinates: 34°14′07″N 132°53′06″E

Location of Toyota District in Hiroshima Prefecture

Toyota (豊田郡, Toyota-gun) is a district located in Hiroshima Prefecture, Japan. Currently the district has only the town of Ōsakikamijima.

As of April, 2008, the district has an estimated population of 8,739 and a Density of 202 persons/km^{2}. The total area is 43.28 km^{2}.

== The towns and villages within Toyota District (As of the city, town, and village status enforcement in 1889) ==
- Setoda (瀬戸田町)
- Tadanoumi (忠海町)
- Mitarai (御手洗町)
- Ōkawa (大河村)
- Ōgusa (大草村)
- Ōsakinakano (大崎中野村)
- Ōsakiminami (大崎南村)
- Ōchō (大長村)
- Ōnori (大乗村)
- Kamikitagata (上北方村)
- Kawamoto (川源村)
- Kitaikuchi (北生口村)
- Kidani (木谷村)
- Kuba (久芳村)
- Kuwanashi (椹梨村)
- Koizumi (小泉村)
- Kōnejima (高根島村)
- Kodani (小谷村)
- Saezaki (佐江崎村)
- Sagiura (鷺浦村)
- Shimokitagata (下北方村)
- Sunami (須波村)
- Zennyūji (善入寺村)
- Takasaka (高坂村)
- Takeni (竹仁村)
- Tanoura (田野浦村)
- Tamari (田万里村)
- Tono (戸野村)
- Toyota (豊田村)
- Toyohama (豊浜村)
- Nagatani (長谷村)
- Nishiikuchi (西生口村)
- Nishino (西野村)
- Nyūno (入野村)
- Nutanishi (沼田西村)
- Nutahigashi (沼田東村)
- Nomi (乃美村)
- Higashiikuchi (東生口村)
- Higashino (東野村)
- Hisatomo (久友村)
- Funaki (船木村)
- Hongō (本郷村)
- Minamiikuchi (南生口村)
- Minamigata (南方村)
- Myōga (名荷村)
- Yoshina (吉名村)

(total of 3 towns, 43 villages)

== Timeline (April 1, 1889~March 31, 1956) ==
- April 1, 1889 Municipal status enforced. It had 3 towns and 43 villages in the past.
- January 1, 1903 The village of Saezaki added Kuwaki from the village of Tanoura.
- April 1, 1917 The village of Ōsakinakano renamed to the village of Nakano.
- January 1, 1920 Parts of the village of Nakano (Noga, etc.) and Higashino (Dochu, etc.) broke off and created the town of Kinoe within the areas (4 towns, 43 villages).
- April 1, 1924 The village of Ōkawa gained town status to become the town of Kōchi (1st generation) (5 towns, 42 villages)
- April 1, 1924 The village of Hongō gained town status to become the town of Hongō (1st generation) (6 towns, 41 villages).
- April 1, 1929 The village of Saizaki renamed and gained town status to become the town of Saizaki (幸崎町) (7 towns, 40 villages).
- November 15, 1936 The villages of Sunami and Tanoura merged with the towns of Itozaki, Mihara, and the villages of Nishino and Yamanaka, Mitsugi District to form the city of Mihara (1st generation) (7 towns, 38 villages)
- April 1, 1937 The town of Setoda and the village of Nishiikuchi merged to form the town of Setoda (7 towns, 37 villages).
- February 20, 1941 The village of Ōchō changed the pronunciation to Daichō.
- January 1, 1943 The village of Kidani merged with the towns of Mitsu and Hayatahara from Kamo District to form the town of Akitsu in Kamo District (7 towns, 36 villages)
- October 1, 1943 The town of Kinoe (木ノ江町) becomes the town of Kinoe (木江町).
- January 1, 1944 The village of Kawamoto and Nomi merged to form the village of Toyosaka (7 towns, 35 villages).
- April 1, 1944 The town of Setoda and the villages of Kitaikuchi, Kōnejima, and Myōga merged to form the town of Setoda (7 towns, 32 villages)
- August 9, 1947 The village of Daichō changed the pronunciation to Ōchō.
- April 1, 1949 The village of Toyosaka gained town status to become the town of Toyosaka (8 towns, 31 villages)
- June 10, 1950 The village of Zōga (now the city of Higashiiroshima) added Zōga from the village of Tono.
- April 1, 1951 The villages of Kamikitagata, Shimokitagata, and Zennyūji merged to form the village of Kitakata (8 towns, 29 villages).
- April 1, 1951 The village of Sakaibara from Mitsugi District (now the city of Mihara) added parts of the village of Takasaka (Kobayashi, Tsuchitori, Yamanakano).
- November 3, 1951 The village of Ōgusa added Ubagahara from the village of Funaki.
- March 22, 1953 The village of Nagatani along with the village of Yahata from Mitsugi District merged into the city of Mihara (8 towns, 28 villages).
- May 1, 1953 The village of Higashiikuchi merged with the towns of Mitsunoshō, Takuma, Habu, and the villages of Ōhama, Shigei, and Nakanoshō from Mitsugi District to form the city of Innoshima (8 towns, 27 villages).
- March 31, 1954 The village of Ōnori and parts of the village of Minamigata along with the village of Higashino from Kamo District merged into the town of Takehara in Kamo District (8 towns, 26 villages).
- April 1, 1954 The village of Koizumi, Nutanishi, and Nutahigashi merged into the city of Mihara (8 towns, 23 villages).
- November 3, 1954 The town of Hongō and the village of Kitagata, Funaki, and Minamigata to form the town of Hongō (8 towns, 20 villages).
- March 31, 1955 The town of Tamari merged with the town of Takehara along with the village of Shōno from Kamo District to become the town of Takehara in Kamo District (8 towns, 19 villages).
- March 31, 1955 The town of Kōchi (1st generation) and the villages of Tono and parts of Oda in the village of Toyota merged to form the town of Kōchi (8 towns, 18 villages).
- March 31, 1955 The villages of Ōgusa, Kuwanashi, and Toyota (excluding parts of Oda) merged with the village of Kanda from Sera District to form the town of Daiwa. As a result, the village of Toyota dissolved (9 towns, 15 villages).
- March 31, 1955 The villages of Nakano and Higashino merged and gained town status to become the town of Ōsaki (10 towns, 13 villages).
- March 31, 1955 The town of Kinoe and the village of Ōsakiminami merged to form the town of Kinoe (10 towns, 12 villages).
- March 31, 1955 The village of Kodani merged into the village of Takaya in Kamo District (now the city of Higashihiroshima) (10 towns, 11 villages).
- April 1, 1955 The town of Setoda and the village of Minamiikuchi merged to form the town of Setoda (10 towns, 10 villages).
- July 10, 1955 The villages of Kuba and Takeni merged and gained town status to become the town of Fukutomi (11 towns, 8 villages).
- March 31, 1956 The town of Mitarai along with the villages of Ōchō and Hisatomo merged to form the town of Yutaka (11 towns, 6 villages).
- March 31, 1956 The city of Mihara absorbed the village of Takasaka (11 towns, 5 villages)

== The towns and villages of Toyota District as of March 31, 1956 (before the change to the municipalities within both Kamo and Toyota Districts) ==
- Ōsaki (大崎町; -cho) → Remained in Toyota District
- Kinoe (木江町; -cho) → Remained in Toyota District
- Kōchi (河内町; -cho) → Moved to Kamo District (Merged into the city of Higashihiroshima on February 7, 2005)
- Saizaki (幸崎町; -cho) → Remained in Toyota District
- Setoda (瀬戸田町; -cho) → Remained in Toyota District
- Daiwa (大和町; -cho) → Moved to Kamo District (Moved to the city of Mihara (2nd) on March 22, 2005)
- Tadanoumi (忠海町; -cho) → Remained in Toyota District
- Toyosaka (豊栄町; -cho) → Moved to Kamo District (Merged into the city of Higashihiroshima on February 7, 2005)
- Fukutomi (福富町; -cho) → Moved to Kamo District (Merged into the city of Higashihiroshima on February 7, 2005)
- Hongō (本郷町; -cho) → Remained in Toyota District
- Yutaka (豊町; -machi) → Remained in Toyota District
- Sagiura (鷺浦村; -mura) → Remained in Toyota District
- Toyohama (豊浜村; -mura) → Remained in Toyota District
- Nyūno (入野村; -mura) → Moved to Kamo District (Merged into the town of Kōchi, Kamo District, on September 30, 1956)
- Higashino (東野村; -mura) → Remained in Toyota District
- Yoshina (吉名村; -mura) → Remained in Toyota District

(total of 11 towns, 5 villages)

== The towns and villages of Toyota District as of April 1, 1956 (after the change to the municipalities within both Kamo and Toyota Districts) ==
- Akitsu (安芸津町; -cho) → Moved from Kamo District
- Ōsaki (大崎町; -cho)
- Kawajiri (川尻町; -cho) → Moved from Kamo District
- Kinoe (木江町; -cho)
- Saizaki (幸崎町; -cho)
- Setoda (瀬戸田町; -cho)
- Takehara (竹原町; -cho) → Moved from Kamo District
- Tadanoumi (忠海町; -cho)
- Hongō (本郷町; -cho)
- Yasuura (安浦町; -cho) → Moved from Kamo District
- Yutaka (豊町; -machi)
- Ato (安登村; -mura) → Moved from Kamo District
- Kanaga (賀永村; -mura) → Moved from Kamo District
- Sagiura (鷺浦村; -mura)
- Toyohama (豊浜村; -mura)
- Higashino (東野村; -mura)
- Yoshina (吉名村; -mura)

(total of 11 towns, 6 villages)

== Timeline (April 1, 1956~Present) ==
- April 1, 1956 4 towns and 1 village within Toyota District moved to Kamo District, while 4 towns and 2 villages within Kamo District moved to Toyota District. At this time, the district had 11 towns and 6 villages.
- September 30, 1956 The town of Saijō, Kamo District (now: the city of Higashihiroshima) absorbed the parts of Niga in the village of Kanaga.
- September 30, 1956 The town of Takehara, Kamo District, absorbed the villages of Yoshina and Kanaga (excluding parts of Nika). As a result, the village of Kanaga dissolved (11 towns, 4 villages)
- September 30, 1956 The city of Mihara absorbed the town of Saizaki and the village of Sagiura (10 towns, 3 villages)
- April 1, 1958 The village of Ato breaks up, merges into the towns of Kawajiri (小用・水落・竜王山と寒風の一部) and Yasuura (前記以外の部分), and dissolves (10 towns, 2 villages).
- November 3, 1958 The towns of Takehara and Tadanoumi merged and gained city status to become the city of Takehara (8 towns, 2 villages).
- April 1, 1964 The village of Higashino gained town status to become the town of Higashino (9 towns, 1 villages).
- November 3, 1969 The village of Toyohama gained town status to become the town of Toyohama (10 towns)
- April 1, 2003 The towns of Ōsaki, Kinoe, and Higashino merged to form the town of Ōsakikamijima (8 towns).
- April 1, 2004 The city of Kure absorbed the town of Kawajiri (7 towns).
- February 7, 2005 The city of Higashihiroshima absorbed the town of Akitsu (6 towns).
- March 20, 2005 The city of Kure absorbed the towns of Toyohama, Yasuura, and Yutaka (3 towns).
- March 22, 2005 The town of Hongō merged with the city of Mihara, the town of Daiwa, from Kamo District, and the town of Kui, from Mitsugi District, to form the new city of Mihara (2 towns).
- January 10, 2006 The city of Onomichi absorbs the city of Innoshima and the town of Setoda (1 town).

== See also ==
- Toyota District, Ibaraki
- Toyota District, Tōtomi
- Toyota District, Kagawa
