= Disordered piling =

Japanese wallbuilding technique

Disordered piling (乱石積, ransekizumi) is a Japanese wall-building technique consisting of large number of small stones packed tightly together. It was used in some Japanese castle walls to create a wall that was difficult to climb. As it became more sophisticated it evolved into a technique known as burdock piling.

== See also ==
- Japanese wall
- Dry stone, a similar concept in Western architecture
