= Higashihiroshima =

Higashihiroshima 東広島市
- City
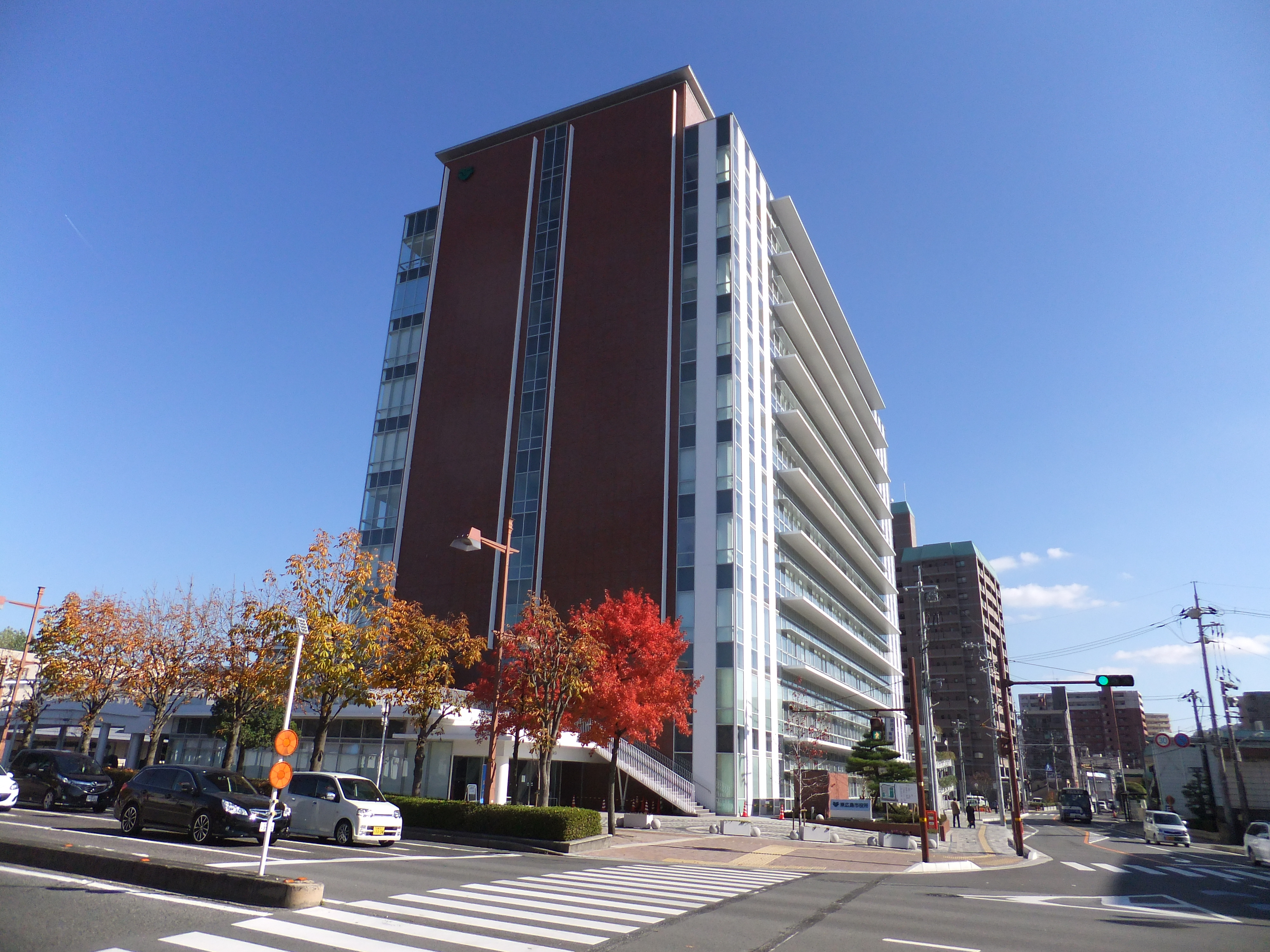
- Higashihiroshima City Hall

- Flag Emblem
- Interactive map of Higashihiroshima
- Location in Japan
- Coordinates: 34°25′35″N 132°44′36″E
- Country: Japan
- Region: Chūgoku (San'yō)
- Prefecture: Hiroshima

Government
  - Mayor: Hironori Takagaki (since February 2018)

Area
  - Total: 635.16 km^{2} (245.24 sq mi)

Population (April 30, 2023)
  - Total: 190,186
  - Density: 299.43/km^{2} (775.52/sq mi)
- Time zone: UTC+09:00 (JST)
- City hall address: 8-29 Saijō Sakaemachi, Higashihiroshima-shi, Hiroshima-ken 739-8601
- Climate: Cfa
- Website: Official website
- Symbols
- Flower: Azalea Rhododendron sect. Tsutsusi
- Tree: Pine

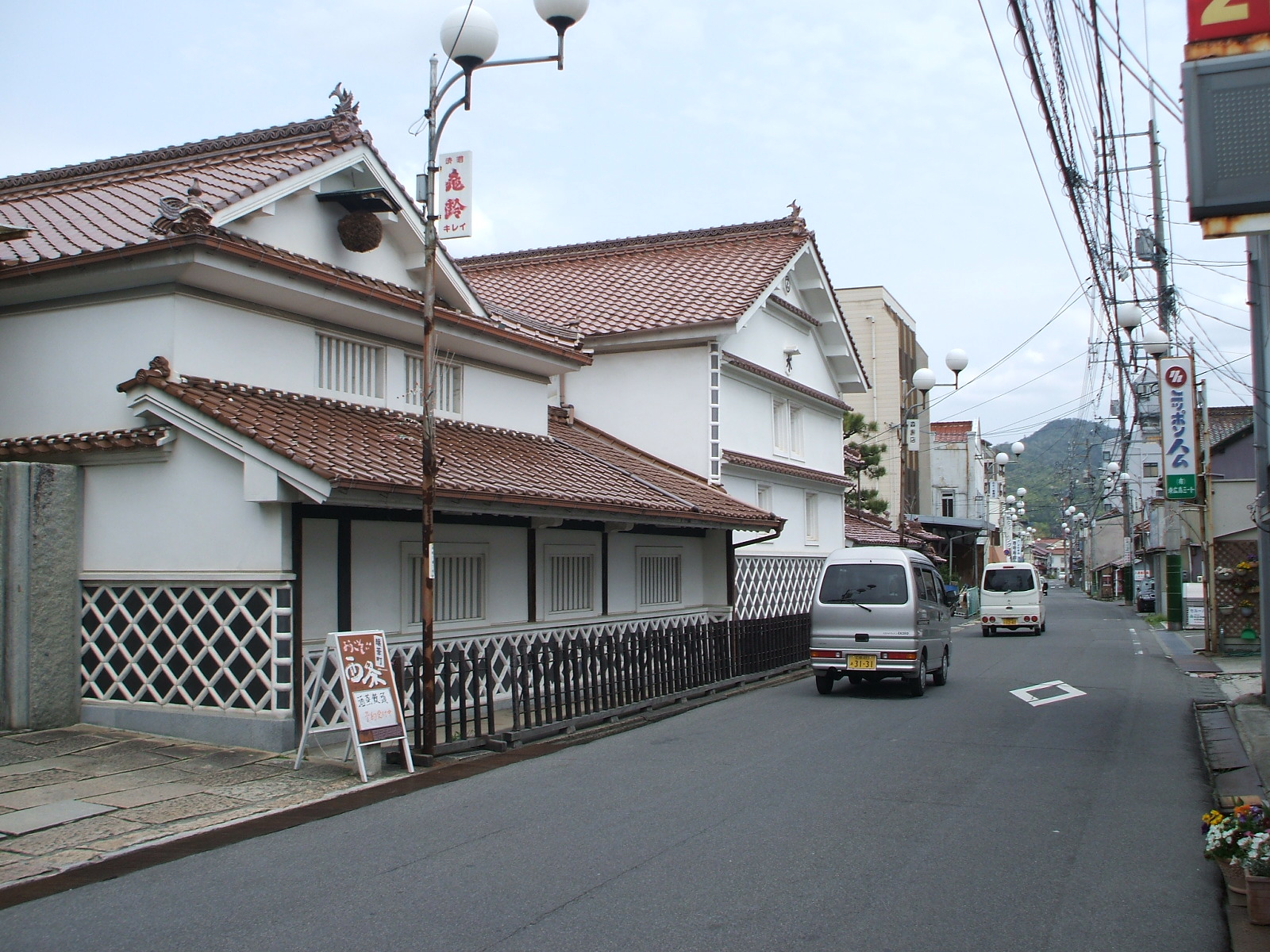
Sake Brewers in Saijō

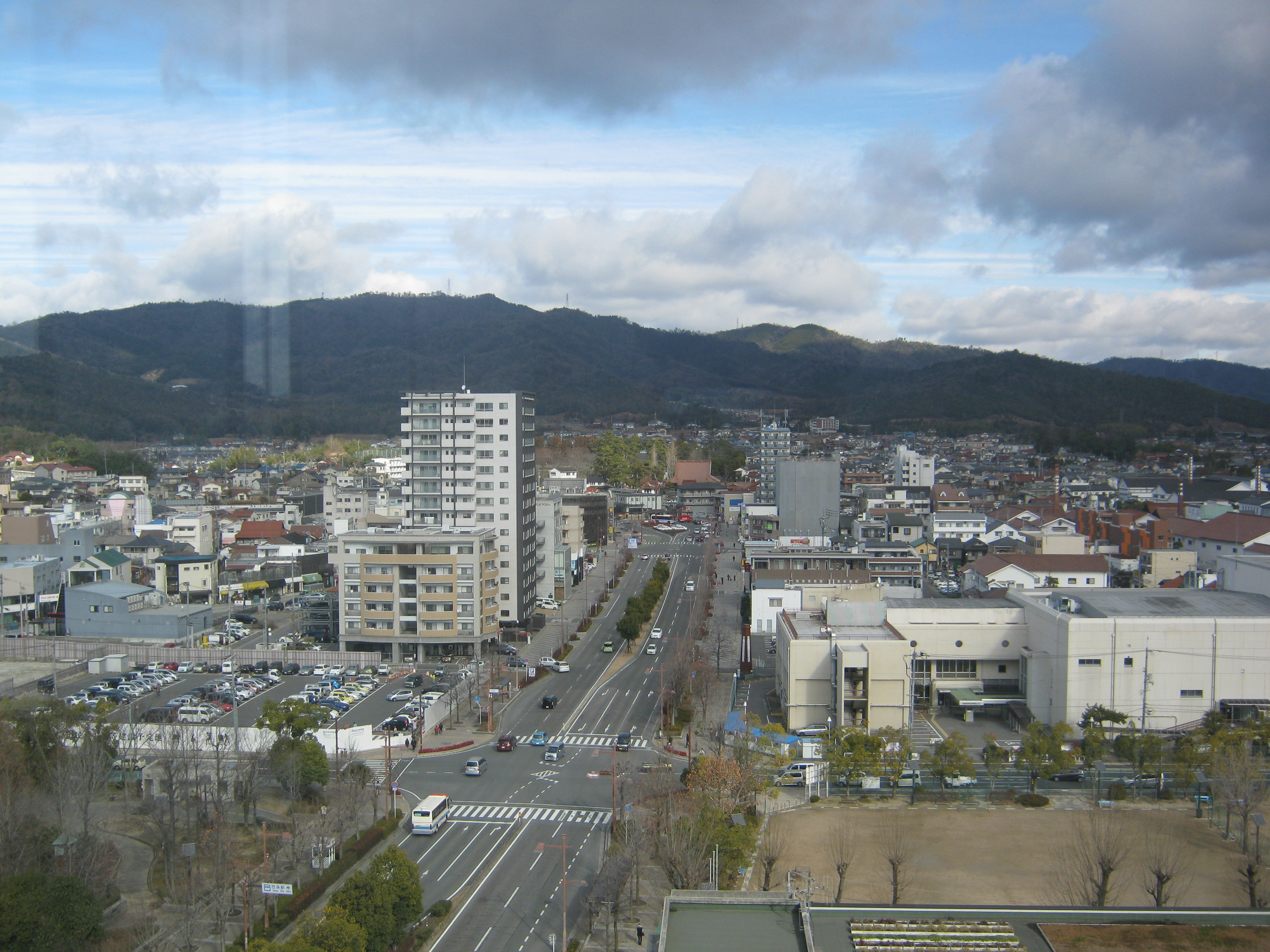
Panorama from Saijō Station

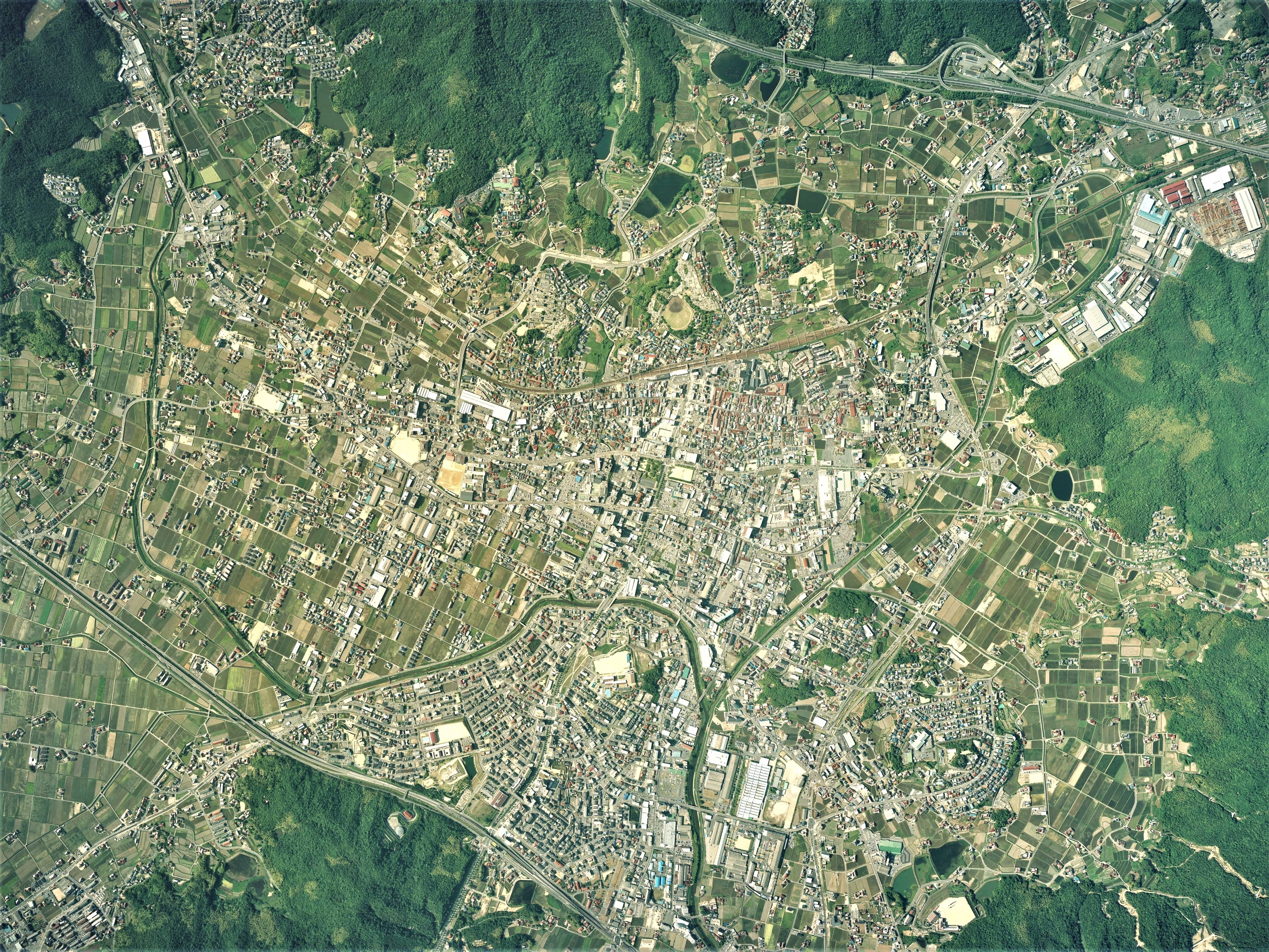
Aerial view of Saijō area of Higashihiroshima

Higashihiroshima (東広島市, Higashihiroshima-shi) is a city located in Hiroshima Prefecture, Japan. As of 30 April 2023, the city had an estimated population of 190,186 in 90,294 households and a population density of 300 persons per km^{2}. The total area of the city is 635.16 square kilometres (245.24 sq mi).

== Geography ==
Higashihiroshima extends from the coast of the Seto Inland Sea to the hilly area in the foothills of the Chugoku Mountains, with a large difference in elevation. It consists of the Saijō Basin, which is the largest basin in the prefecture, and the main urban center, and small basins scattered around it. The Numata River is located to the east, the Kurose River to the south, and the Seno River to the west. Because it is located in a basin, the diurnal temperature range (day and night) and annual temperature range (summer and winter) are large.

=== Adjoining municipalities ===
Hiroshima Prefecture

- Akitakata
- Hiroshima
- Kumano
- Kure
- Mihara
- Miyoshi
- Ōsakikamijima
- Sera
- Takehara

=== Demographics ===
Per Japanese census data, the population of Higashihiroshima in 2020 is 196,608 people. Higashihiroshima has been conducting censuses since 1960.

Historical population
Year	Pop.	±%
1960	97,063	—
1965	91,630	−5.6%
1970	93,587	+2.1%
1975	108,219	+15.6%
1980	120,871	+11.7%
1985	131,159	+8.5%
1990	142,088	+8.3%
1995	165,153	+16.2%
2000	175,346	+6.2%
2005	184,430	+5.2%
2010	190,043	+3.0%
2015	192,907	+1.5%
2020	196,608	+1.9%
Higashihiroshima population statistics

== Climate ==
Higashihiroshima has a humid subtropical climate (Köppen climate classification Cfa) characterized by cool to mild winters and hot, humid summers. The average annual temperature in Higashihiroshima is 13.7 °C (56.7 °F). The average annual rainfall is 1,457.6 mm (57.39 in) with July as the wettest month. The temperatures are highest on average in August, at around 25.8 °C (78.4 °F), and lowest in January, at around 2.3 °C (36.1 °F). The highest temperature ever recorded in Higashihiroshima was 37.0 °C (98.6 °F) on 17 July 1994; the coldest temperature ever recorded was −12.6 °C (9.3 °F) on 31 January 1981.

Climate data for Higashihiroshima (1991–2020 normals, extremes 1979–present)
Month	Jan	Feb	Mar	Apr	May	Jun	Jul	Aug	Sep	Oct	Nov	Dec	Year
Record high °C (°F)	18.3 (64.9)	20.7 (69.3)	23.9 (75.0)	29.2 (84.6)	31.4 (88.5)	34.0 (93.2)	37.0 (98.6)	37.3 (99.1)	35.5 (95.9)	30.5 (86.9)	26.5 (79.7)	20.3 (68.5)	37.3 (99.1)
Mean daily maximum °C (°F)	7.7 (45.9)	8.9 (48.0)	12.8 (55.0)	18.7 (65.7)	23.6 (74.5)	26.3 (79.3)	29.9 (85.8)	31.5 (88.7)	27.4 (81.3)	21.9 (71.4)	15.9 (60.6)	10.1 (50.2)	19.6 (67.3)
Daily mean °C (°F)	2.3 (36.1)	3.2 (37.8)	6.6 (43.9)	12.1 (53.8)	17.3 (63.1)	21.2 (70.2)	25.0 (77.0)	25.8 (78.4)	21.8 (71.2)	15.6 (60.1)	9.5 (49.1)	4.4 (39.9)	13.7 (56.7)
Mean daily minimum °C (°F)	−2.6 (27.3)	−2.1 (28.2)	0.6 (33.1)	5.4 (41.7)	11.1 (52.0)	16.6 (61.9)	21.0 (69.8)	21.5 (70.7)	17.1 (62.8)	10.0 (50.0)	3.7 (38.7)	−0.8 (30.6)	8.5 (47.3)
Record low °C (°F)	−12.6 (9.3)	−11.9 (10.6)	−7.3 (18.9)	−3.8 (25.2)	−0.3 (31.5)	7.9 (46.2)	12.7 (54.9)	13.4 (56.1)	4.5 (40.1)	−0.8 (30.6)	−4.3 (24.3)	−8.7 (16.3)	−12.6 (9.3)
Average precipitation mm (inches)	46.9 (1.85)	60.0 (2.36)	105.0 (4.13)	120.6 (4.75)	147.7 (5.81)	207.4 (8.17)	253.0 (9.96)	131.3 (5.17)	158.2 (6.23)	106.0 (4.17)	67.4 (2.65)	54.3 (2.14)	1,457.6 (57.39)
Average precipitation days (≥ 1.0 mm)	6.1	7.4	9.9	9.5	9.1	11.0	10.8	8.3	9.2	7.3	6.7	6.5	101.8
Mean monthly sunshine hours	134.6	133.8	170.4	188.4	204.5	142.2	163.9	194.3	149.5	167.2	143.2	133.6	1,925.6
Source: Japan Meteorological Agency (1991–2020 normals, extremes 1979–present)

== History ==
The area of Higashihiroshima is mostly part of ancient Aki Province. Archaeologists have found evidence of continuous human settlement from the Japanese Paleolithic period, with the oldest remains of several dwellings dating back to 22,000 years ago. Traces from the Yayoi period through the Kofun period are numerous, including the Mitsushiro Kofun, a National Historic Site. During the Nara period, the ancient Sanyōdō highway connecting the Kinai region with Kyushu passed close to the north side of Saijō Station. Aki Kokubun-ji was located in what is now Higashihiroshima, and through geographic names, the original kokufu of the province was located in the vicinity before it was relocated to Fuchū in the Heian period. During the Muromachi period, the area was dominated by the Ouchi clan, who built Kagamiyama Castle, the ruins of which are a National Historic Site. The Ouchi were replaced after 200 years by the Mōri clan in the Sengoku period. After the establishment of the Tokugawa Shogunate, the area was part of the holdings of Fukushima Masanori and later the Asano clan of Hiroshima Domain.

=== Municipal mergers ===
- On April 1, 1889 - The town of Saijō was established with the creation of the modern municipalities system.
- On April 20, 1974 - Saijō merged with the towns of Shiwa, Takaya and Hachihonmatsu in Kamo District to form the city of Higashihiroshima.
- On February 7, 2005 - The towns of Kurose, Kōchi, Toyosaka and Fukutomi (all from Kamo District), and the town of Akitsu (from Toyota District) were merged into Higashihiroshima.

== Government ==
Higashihiroshima has a mayor-council form of government with a directly elected mayor and a unicameral city council of 30 members. Higashihiroshima contributes four members to the Hiroshima Prefectural Assembly. In terms of national politics, the city is part of the Hiroshima 4th district of the lower house of the Diet of Japan.

== Economy ==
Higashihiroshima has a mixed economy. The area has traditionally been associated with sake brewing, and sake remains an important industry. Other industries include semiconductors, automobile related parts/special equipment, shipbuilding, and brick making, as well as agriculture centered on rice, and commercial fishing.

== Education ==
Higashihiroshima has 37 public elementary schools and 15 public junior high schools operated by the city government, and six public high schools, and one combined middle/high school operated by the Hiroshima prefectural Board of education. There are also two private middle schools and two private high schools.

In terms of higher education, Higashihiroshima hosts a campus of Hiroshima University, Elisabeth University of Music, Kindai University and Hiroshima International University

== Transportation ==
=== Railway ===
JR West – San'yō Shinkansen

- Higashi-Hiroshima

JR West (JR West) - San'yō Main Line

- Hongō - Kōchi - Nyūno - Shiraichi - Nishitakaya - Saijō - Jike - Hachihonmatsu

JR West (JR West) - Kure Line

- Akitsu - Kazahaya

=== Highways ===
- San'yō Expressway
- National Route 2
- National Route 185
- National Route 375
- National Route 432
- National Route 486

== Sister city relations ==
- - Marília, São Paulo, Brazil, sister city since November 2, 1980
- - Deyang, Sichuan, China, friendship city since October 14, 1993
- - Virginia Beach, Virginia, United States, friendship city since October 26, 1993

== Local attractions ==
Higashihiroshima is famous for making sake, and along the Sakagura Dōri ("Sake Storehouse Road") area near JR Saijō Station are the Namako wall (white-lattice walled) and Sekishu Gawara (red-roof tile) roofs of ten well-known sake breweries. An annual sake festival is held every October.

== Notable people from Higashihiroshima ==
- Reizo Fukuhara, Japanese soccer player (Midfielder)
- Yūki Himura, Japanese comedian, Japanese actor and voice actor
- Ryuichi Hirashige, Japanese former footballer (Striker)
- Akira Ibayashi, Japanese soccer player (Sanfrecce Hiroshima, J1 League)
- Koichi Isobe, former Nippon Professional Baseball outfielder
- Akinoshima Katsumi, former sumo wrestler (Real Name: Katsumi Yamanaka, Nihongo: 山中勝美, Yamanaka Katsumi)
- Daiki Nishiyama, Japanese judoka
- Ayako Okamoto, Japanese professional golfer and member of the World Golf Hall of Fame
- Ryuji Sainei, Japanese actor
- Toru Takahashi, Japanese racing driver
- Yasuyuki Yamauchi, Japanese professional baseball player and baseball coach
- Hirotake Yano, businessman who was the founder of the Daiso discount retail chain
