= Ryuichi Hirashige =

Japanese footballer

Ryuichi Hirashige 平繁 龍一
Personal information
- Full name: Ryuichi Hirashige
- Date of birth: 15 June 1988 (age 38)
- Place of birth: Higashihiroshima, Japan
- Height: 1.75 m (5 ft 9 in)
- Position: Striker

Youth career
- –2006: Sanfrecce Hiroshima

Senior career*
Years	Team	Apps	(Gls)
2007–2012	Sanfrecce Hiroshima	49	(7)
2010	→ Tokushima Vortis (loan)	26	(4)
2011	→ Tokyo Verdy (loan)	12	(4)
2013–2014	Thespakusatsu Gunma	61	(20)
2015–2017	Roasso Kumamoto	61	(8)
2017	→ Kataller Toyama (loan)	13	(0)
2018	Thespakusatsu Gunma	4	(0)

International career
2007	Japan U20	1	(0)
Medal record
Sanfrecce Hiroshima
Winner	J1 League	2012
Runner-up	Emperor's Cup	2007
- * Club domestic league appearances and goals as of 2 April 2020

Ryuichi Hirashige (平繁 龍一, Hirashige Ryuichi; born 15 June 1988 in Higashihiroshima, Hiroshima) is a former Japanese footballer who last played for Thespakusatsu Gunma.

== National team career ==
In July 2007, Hirashige was elected Japan U-20 national team for 2007 U-20 World Cup. At this tournament, he played 1 match against Nigeria.

== Career statistics ==
Updated to 23 February 2019.

Appearances and goals by club, season and competition
Club	Season	League			Emperor's Cup		J.League Cup		Total	
Club	Season	Division	Apps	Goals	Apps	Goals	Apps	Goals	Apps	Goals
Sanfrecce Hiroshima	2007	J1 League	20	0	4	1	6	2	30	3
Sanfrecce Hiroshima	2008	J2 League	17	5	1	0	—		18	5
Sanfrecce Hiroshima	2009	J1 League	9	0	1	1	4	1	14	2
Tokushima Vortis	2010	J2 League	26	4	1	0	—		27	4
Tokyo Verdy	2011	J2 League	12	4	0	0	—		12	4
Sanfrecce Hiroshima	2012	J1 League	3	2	0	0	2	0	5	2
Thespakusatsu Gunma	2013	J2 League	41	13	0	0	—		41	13
Thespakusatsu Gunma	2014	J2 League	20	7	1	0	—		21	7
Roasso Kumamoto	2015	J2 League	23	1	2	0	—		25	1
Roasso Kumamoto	2016	J2 League	31	6	2	2	—		33	8
Roasso Kumamoto	2017	J2 League	7	1	0	0	—		7	1
Kataller Toyama	2017	J3 League	13	0	—		—		13	0
Thespakusatsu Gunma	2018	J3 League	4	0	0	0	—		4	0
Career total			226	43	12	4	12	3	250	50
