= Akitsu, Hiroshima =

Dissolved municipality in Japan

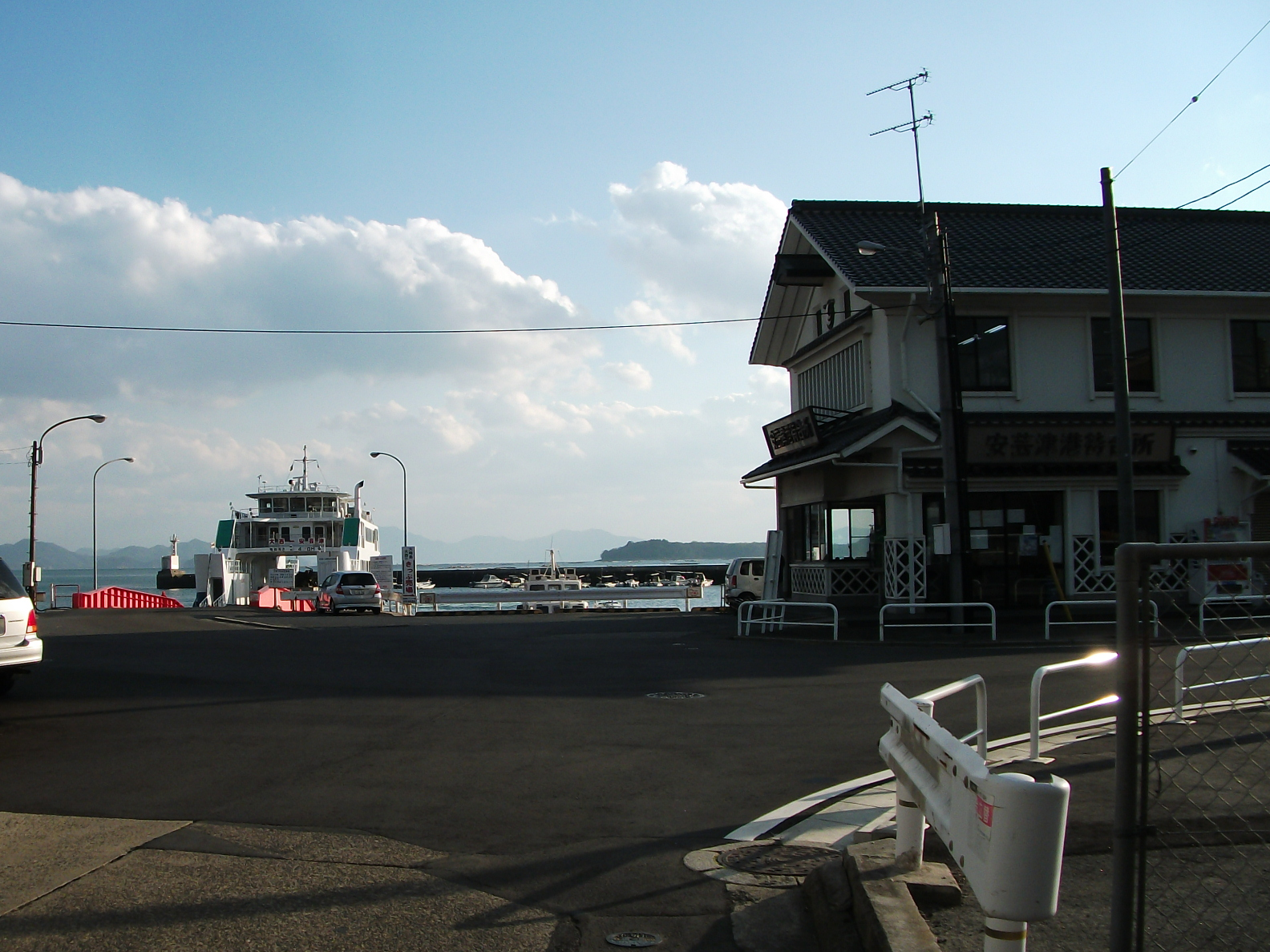
The port of Akitsu

Flag of Akitsu, Hiroshima

Akitsu (安芸津町, Akitsu-chō) was a town located in Toyota District, Hiroshima Prefecture, Japan.

As of 2003, the town had an estimated population of 12,023 and a density of 184.74 persons per km^{2}. The total area was 65.08 km^{2}.

On February 7, 2005, Akitsu, along with the towns of Fukutomi, Kōchi, Kurose and Toyosaka (all from Kamo District), was merged into the expanded city of Higashihiroshima and no longer exists as independent municipalities.

Akitsu's local specialties include oysters and potatoes.
