= Yasuyuki Yamauchi =

Japanese baseball player

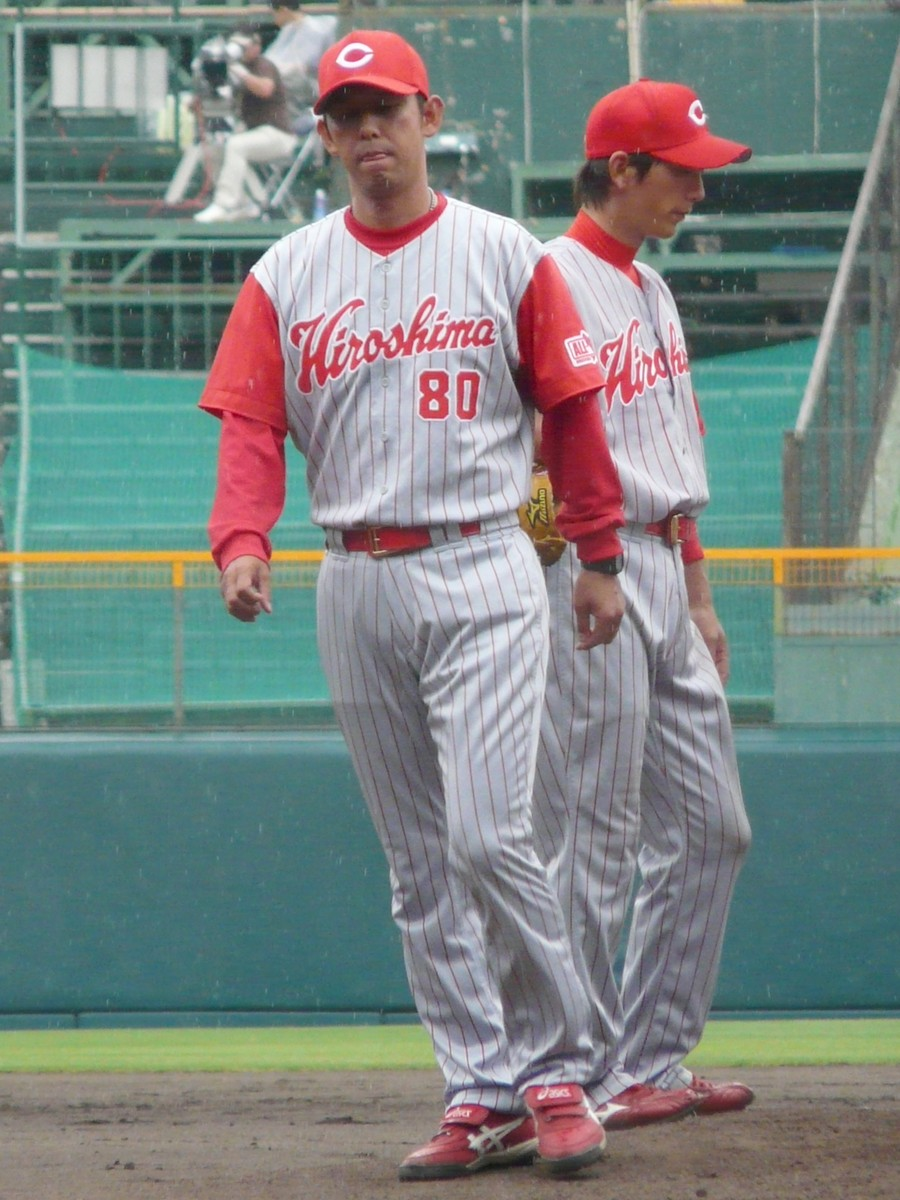
- Pitcher / Coach
- Born: March 16, 1973 (age 52); Higashihiroshima, Hiroshima, Japan
- Batted: Right Threw: Right

NPB debut
- April 11, 1995, for the Hiroshima Toyo Carp

Last NPB appearance
- October 14, 2002, for the Hiroshima Toyo Carp

NPB statistics (through 2002)
- Win–loss record: 45-44
- Saves: 1
- ERA: 4.40
- Strikeouts: 508

Teams
- As player: Hiroshima Toyo Carp (1995–2002); As coach: Hiroshima Toyo Carp (2003–2014)

Career highlights and awards
- 1995 Central League Rookie of the Year
Medals
Men's baseball
Representing Japan
Baseball World Cup
Bronze medal – third place	1994 Managua	Team

Yasuyuki Yamauchi (山内 泰幸, Yamauchi Yasuyuki; born March 16, 1973, in Higashihiroshima, Hiroshima, Japan) is a professional Japanese baseball player.
