= Japanese wall =

A Japanese wall is composed of a mixture of sand, clay, diatomaceous earth and straw, and is a traditional element in the construction of Japanese teahouses, castles and temples. Today, teahouses continue to use this product for Zen purposes.

Traditional methods for building and decorating Japanese walls were included in the Japanese government's 1975 update to the Law for the Protection of Cultural Properties (1950).

== See also ==
- Burdock piling
- Disordered piling
- Namako wall
