= Takehara =

Takehara 竹原市
- City
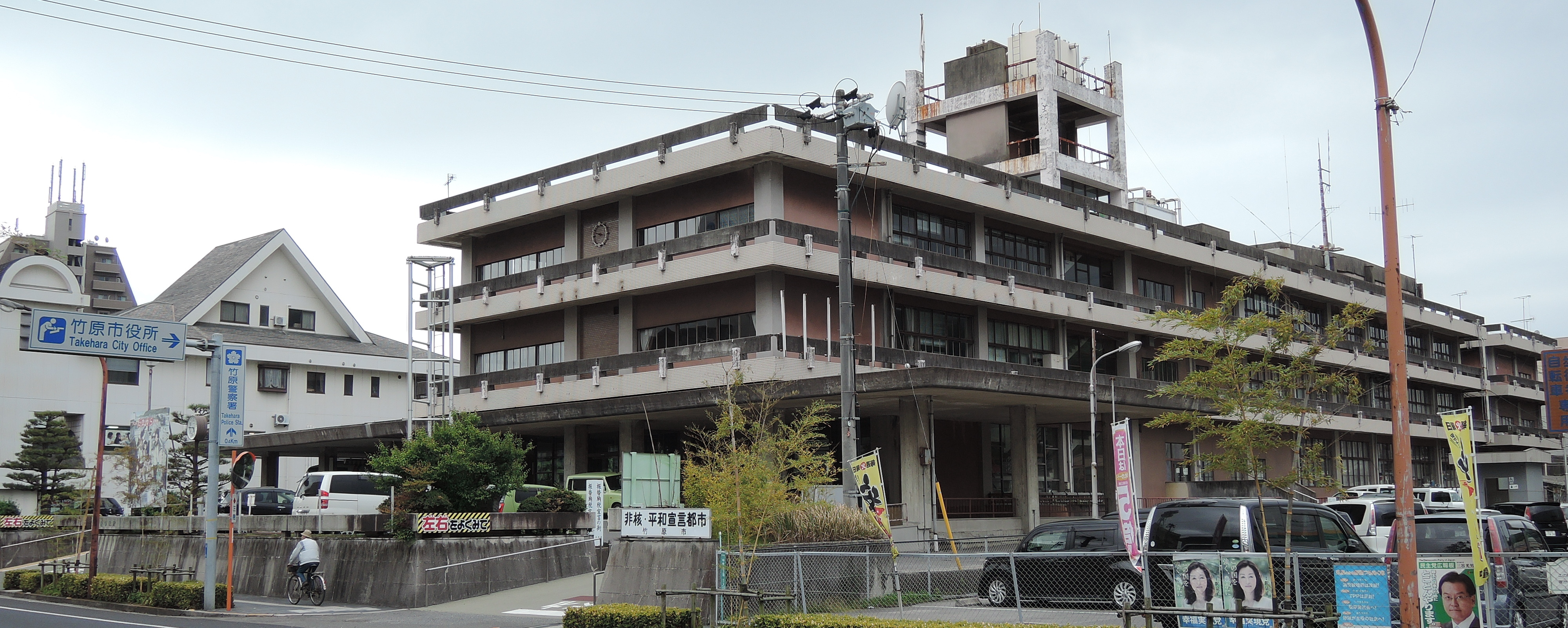
- Takehara city hall

- Flag Seal
- /0/queryThe property query is required; /0/idsThe property ids is required; /0Failed to match at least one schema; /0/titleThe property title is required; /0/serviceDoes not have a value in the enumeration ["page"]; /0Failed to match exactly one schema; /0/geometriesThe property geometries is required; /0/typeDoes not have a value in the enumeration ["GeometryCollection"]; /0/typeDoes not have a value in the enumeration ["MultiPolygon"]; /0/typeDoes not have a value in the enumeration ["Point"]; /0/typeDoes not have a value in the enumeration ["MultiPoint"]; /0/typeDoes not have a value in the enumeration ["LineString"]; /0/typeDoes not have a value in the enumeration ["MultiLineString"]; /0/typeDoes not have a value in the enumeration ["Polygon"]; /0/coordinatesThe property coordinates is required; /0/geometryThe property geometry is required; /0/typeDoes not have a value in the enumeration ["Feature"]; /0/featuresThe property features is required; /0/typeDoes not have a value in the enumeration ["FeatureCollection"]; Location of Takehara in Hiroshima Prefecture

- Location in Japan
- Coordinates: 34°20′30″N 132°54′25″E
- Country: Japan
- Region: Chūgoku (San'yō)
- Prefecture: Hiroshima
- As Shimoichi village settled: April 1, 1889
- As Takehara town name changed: April 17, 1889
- City settled: November 3, 1958

Government
  - Mayor: Akimichi Hirai (ja:平井明道) - from January 2026

Area
  - Total: 118.23 km^{2} (45.65 sq mi)

Population (April 30, 2023)
  - Total: 23,350
  - Density: 197.5/km^{2} (511.5/sq mi)
- Time zone: UTC+09:00 (JST)
- City hall address: 5-1-35 Takehara Chuo, Takehara-shi, Hiroshima-ken 725-8666
- Climate: Cfa
- Website: www.city.takehara.lg.jp
- Symbols
- Flower: Ume
- Tree: Bamboo

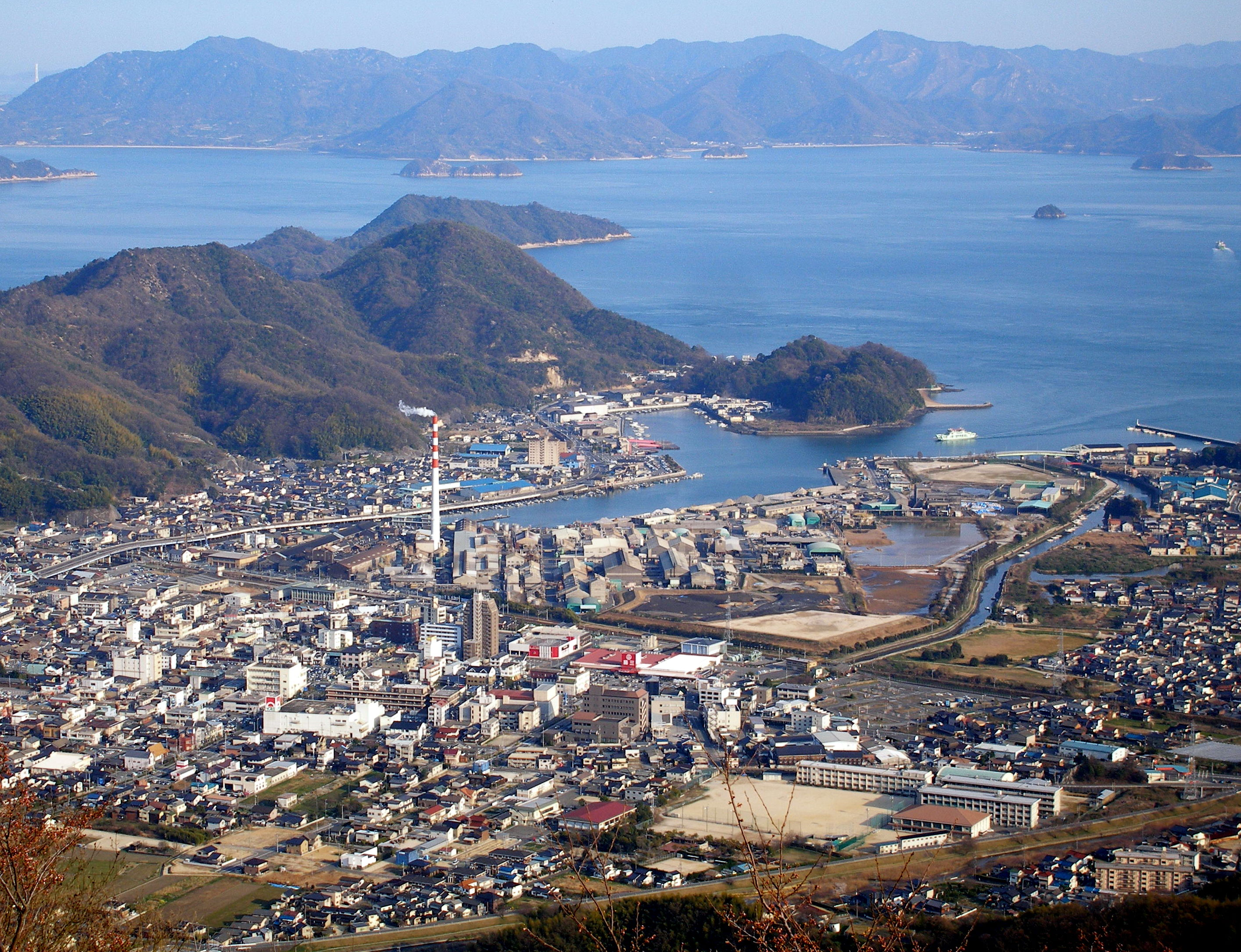
Panorama of Takehara City center

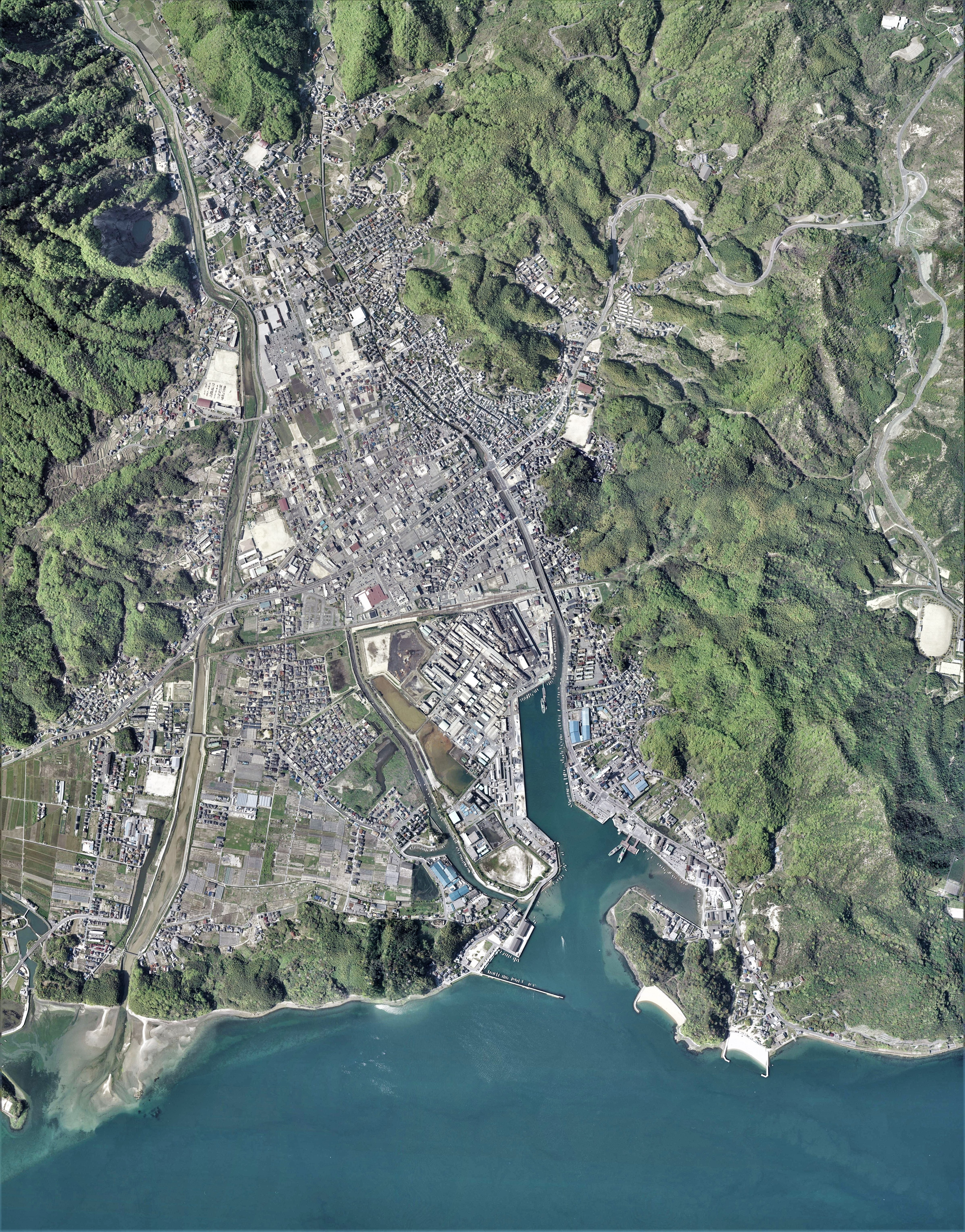
Aerial photograph of Takehara City center

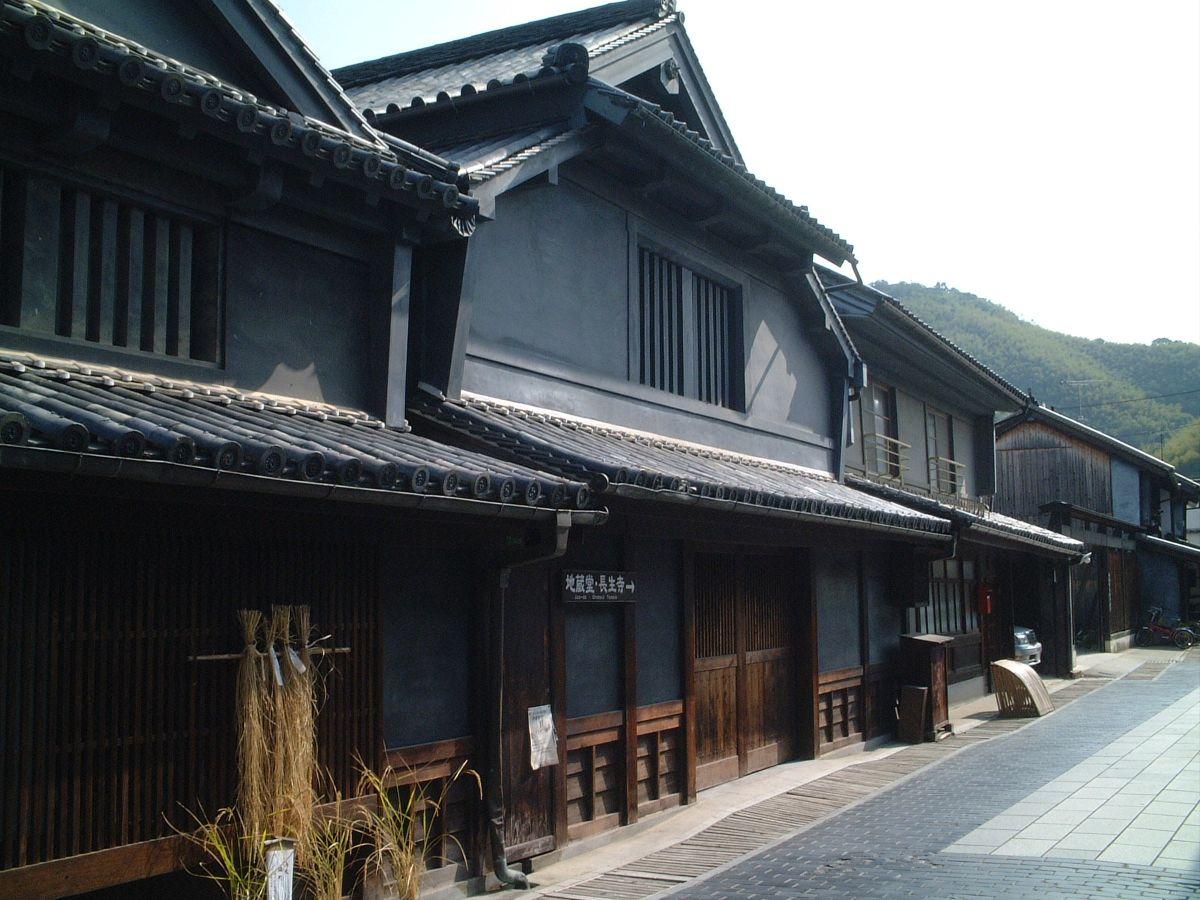
Taketsuru house in Takehara historic preservation district

Takehara (竹原市, Takehara-shi) is a city located in Hiroshima Prefecture, Japan. As of 30 April 2023, the city had an estimated population of 23,350 in 12,034 households and a population density of 200 persons per km^{2}. The total area of the city is 118.23 square kilometres (45.65 sq mi).

== Geography ==
Mihara is located in south-central Hiroshima Prefecture. It faces the Seto Inland Sea to the south. The urban area is broadly divided into a fan-shaped public office/commercial district centered on Takehara Station, a harbor/industrial district centered around the port, and a townscape preservation district that includes temples and other cultural properties. Ōkunoshima, the island where a poison gas plant of the Imperial Japanese Army was located, belongs to Takehara.

=== Adjoining municipalities ===
Hiroshima Prefecture

- Higashihiroshima
- Mihara
- Ōsakikamijima

=== Climate ===
Takehara has a humid subtropical climate (Köppen climate classification Cfa) characterized by cool to mild winters and hot, humid summers. The average annual temperature in Takehara is 15.4 °C (59.7 °F). The average annual rainfall is 1,212.3 mm (47.73 in) with July as the wettest month. The temperatures are highest on average in August, at around 26.5 °C (79.7 °F), and lowest in January, at around 5.7 °C (42.3 °F). The highest temperature ever recorded in Takehara was 35.5 °C (95.9 °F) on 2 August 2026; the coldest temperature ever recorded was −6.6 °C (20.1 °F) on 26 February 1981.

Climate data for Takehara (1991−2020 normals, extremes 1979−present)
Month	Jan	Feb	Mar	Apr	May	Jun	Jul	Aug	Sep	Oct	Nov	Dec	Year
Record high °C (°F)	15.9 (60.6)	19.5 (67.1)	22.4 (72.3)	25.2 (77.4)	26.7 (80.1)	30.9 (87.6)	34.8 (94.6)	35.5 (95.9)	34.7 (94.5)	30.1 (86.2)	23.7 (74.7)	20.3 (68.5)	35.5 (95.9)
Mean daily maximum °C (°F)	9.4 (48.9)	9.7 (49.5)	12.5 (54.5)	16.9 (62.4)	21.2 (70.2)	24.1 (75.4)	27.7 (81.9)	30.0 (86.0)	27.5 (81.5)	22.5 (72.5)	17.1 (62.8)	11.9 (53.4)	19.2 (66.6)
Daily mean °C (°F)	5.7 (42.3)	5.8 (42.4)	8.6 (47.5)	13.0 (55.4)	17.3 (63.1)	20.8 (69.4)	24.5 (76.1)	26.5 (79.7)	23.7 (74.7)	18.4 (65.1)	12.9 (55.2)	8.0 (46.4)	15.4 (59.8)
Mean daily minimum °C (°F)	2.0 (35.6)	1.9 (35.4)	4.5 (40.1)	9.1 (48.4)	13.8 (56.8)	18.2 (64.8)	22.1 (71.8)	23.9 (75.0)	20.5 (68.9)	14.7 (58.5)	9.0 (48.2)	4.2 (39.6)	12.0 (53.6)
Record low °C (°F)	−4.7 (23.5)	−6.6 (20.1)	−3.1 (26.4)	−0.1 (31.8)	5.8 (42.4)	11.7 (53.1)	16.1 (61.0)	17.4 (63.3)	10.3 (50.5)	4.8 (40.6)	0.3 (32.5)	−3.2 (26.2)	−6.6 (20.1)
Average precipitation mm (inches)	38.1 (1.50)	48.5 (1.91)	88.6 (3.49)	95.6 (3.76)	121.1 (4.77)	193.2 (7.61)	213.7 (8.41)	98.1 (3.86)	121.8 (4.80)	86.4 (3.40)	59.9 (2.36)	45.3 (1.78)	1,212.3 (47.73)
Average precipitation days (≥ 1.0 mm)	5.0	6.8	9.1	9.2	8.9	10.8	9.8	7.0	8.3	6.6	6.0	5.5	93
Mean monthly sunshine hours	156.5	153.6	180.2	199.9	219.2	166.6	205.1	238.5	172.5	183.6	163.2	154.7	2,190.8
Source: Japan Meteorological Agency

=== Demographics ===
Per Japanese census data, the population of Takehara in 2020 is 23,993 people. Takehara has been conducting censuses since 1960.

Historical population
Year	Pop.	±%
1960	36,424	—
1965	35,018	−3.9%
1970	35,017	−0.0%
1975	36,273	+3.6%
1980	36,895	+1.7%
1985	36,286	−1.7%
1990	34,771	−4.2%
1995	33,451	−3.8%
2000	31,935	−4.5%
2005	30,657	−4.0%
2010	28,655	−6.5%
2015	26,426	−7.8%
2020	23,993	−9.2%
Takehara population statistics

== History ==
The Takehara area is part of ancient Aki Province and has been settled since prehistoric times. During the Heian period, it was the location of a shōen landed estate controlled by Shimogamo Shrine in Kyoto Known as a port town since the Muromachi period, it prospered as a center of the salt industry in the latter half of the Edo period under the control of Hiroshima Domain. After the Meiji restoration, the area become part of Kamo District, Hiroshima. On April 1, 1889 the village of Shimoichi was formed with the establishment of the modern municipalities system. On April 17, 1889 Shimoichi was elevated to town status to become the town of Takehara. Takehara was elevated to city status on November 3, 1958. Takehara's Special Historical District of old warehouses was selected as one of Japan's "100 Most Scenic Towns".

== Government ==
Takahara has a mayor-council form of government with a directly elected mayor and a unicameral city council of 14 members. Mihara, collectively with the town of Ōsakikamijima, contributes one member to the Hiroshima Prefectural Assembly. In terms of national politics, the city is part of the Hiroshima 5th district of the lower house of the Diet of Japan.

== Economy ==
Takehara's economy is based on agriculture, commercial fishing and food processing. The city is also promoting its historical district as a tourist destination as the "Little Kyoto of Aki".

== Education ==
Takehara has eight public elementary schools, and three public junior high schools operated by the city government, and two public high schools operated by the Hiroshima Prefectural Board of Education. Hiroshima University's Fisheries Experiment Station is located in Takehara.

== Transportation ==
=== Railway ===
JR West (JR West) - Kure Line

- Tadanoumi - Akinagahama - Ōnori - Takehara - Yoshina

=== Highways ===
- National Route 2
- National Route 185
- National Route 375
- National Route 432

== Sister city relations ==
- - Damyang County, South Korea.

== Local attractions ==
=== Museums ===
- Takehara Museum
- Kaguyahime Bamboo Princess Museum
- Masayuki Imai (Ceramic Artist) Museum (in Japanese)
- History of Takehara Museum
- Ozasaya Sake Museum

=== Mountains and Islands ===
- Mount Asahi (Otake) (in Japanese)
- Mount Kurotaki
- Ōkunoshima Island

=== "Little Kyoto of Aki Province" ===
- Takehara Historical Heritage
- Okakae Jizo Statue
- Chosei-ji Temple (in Japanese)
- Saihō-ji (Takehara) Temple
- Shoren-ji Temple
- Kodo Ebisu-do Shrine (in Japanese)

=== Hot spring and Sakura (Cherry Blossom Tree) Park ===
- Yusaka Onsen-kyo (in Japanese)
- Comprehensive Park Bamboo Joy Highland (in Japanese)

=== Festivals and Events ===
- Miyatoko Children's Festival at Tadanoumi (April) (in Japanese)
- Nika Village Renge (Lotus) Festival (April)
- Takehara Take (Bamboo) Festival in the Conserved Townscape (May)
- Tadanoumi Gion (Purification Ritual) Festival (July) (in Japanese)
- Takehara Tanabata Festival (July) (in Japanese)
- Tadanoumi Tenjin Yoichi Summer Festival (July)
- Takehara Sumiyoshi Shrine Sea Festival (August) (in Japanese)
- Takehara Summer Festival Fireworks (August) (in Japanese)
- Fukuda Shishimai Lion Dance (October) (in Japanese)
- Bamboo Candle Light Festival Shokei no Michi (October) (in Japanese)
- Takehara Ekiden (October)
- Rabbit Cross Country Short Running Race on Ōkunoshima Island (November)
- Shinmeisai Fire Festival at Futamado, Tadanoumi (February) (in Japanese)

== Notable people from Takehara ==
- Shōgo Hamada, singer-songwriter
- Hayato Ikeda, Prime Minister from 1960 - 1964
- Naganori Ito, Chief development engineer of Nissan Skyline
- Masataka Taketsuru, founder of Japan's whisky industry

== In popular culture ==
Takehara is the setting for the slice-of-life anime series Tamayura.

- Massan - NHK Asadora (morning drama) television series inspired by the life of Taketsuru and his wife Rita
