= Gromwell =

Gromwell may refer to plants in one of two closely related genera:

- Lithodora
- Lithospermum
