= Kawajiri, Hiroshima =

Dissolved municipality in Hiroshima prefecture, Japan

Kawajiri (川尻町, Kawajiri-chō) was a town located in Toyota District, Hiroshima Prefecture, Japan.

As of 2003, the town had an estimated population of 10,017 and a density of 594.48 persons per km^{2}. The total area was 16.85 km^{2}.

On April 1, 2004, Kawajiri was merged into the expanded city of Kure and no longer exists as an independent municipality.
