= Saijō, Hiroshima (Kamo) =

Saijō 西条町
- Town
- Interactive map of Saijō
- Country: Japan
- Prefecture: Hiroshima
- District: Kamo
- Merged: 1974 (now part of Higashihiroshima)
- Time zone: UTC+09:00 (JST)

Saijō-chō (西条町, Saijō-chō) was a town located in Kamo District, Hiroshima, Japan. The town is the administrative center of Higashihiroshima.

== History ==
From the earliest times, the fertile region around Saijō (part of the ancient province of Aki) has been occupied, as displayed by the Mitsushiro Kofun (a 5th-century burial mound) and the Aki-Kokubunji (Aki-Kokubun temple) from the 8th century. It benefited from its location on the San'yōdō linking the capital with Kyūshū, but the benefit was double-edged as its communications and proximity to the sea meant it was heavily embroiled in the Sengoku period struggles between the clans of western Honshū. During the later Edo period, Saijō was a post-town on the San'yōdō and home to a government office. In 1974 the Kamo District towns of Saijō, Hachihonmatsu, Shiwa and Takaya were combined to form Higashihiroshima, the twelfth city in Hiroshima Prefecture.

In April 1973, Saijō was chosen as the home of the (largely) relocated Hiroshima University, with the relocation occurring between 1982 and 1995. The relocation of the university and the establishment of the Hiroshima Central Technopolis (since 1984) has created many jobs and intellectual opportunities, a new communications network (Saijō was made part of the Sanyo Shinkansen in October 1993) and has put the area on the technology map, but has also seen much of the green-field areas eaten up as the population of Higashihiroshima City soared to 100,000 (August 1992).

== Sake ==
Saijō is famed for sake (rice wine). Within the narrow streets of the Sakagura Dori ("Sake Storehouse Road") area near JR Saijō Station are the Namako wall (white-lattice walled) and Sekishu Gawara (red-roof tile) roofs of ten well-known sake breweries; Chiyonoharu, Fukubijin, Hakubotan, Kamoki, Kamoizumi, Kamotsuru, Kirei, Saijotsuru, Sakurafubuki, and Sanyotsuru. From July 1995, Saijō was made the home of the Brewery Laboratory of the National Tax Office. Each October there is also the Saijō Sake Matsuri 酒まつり (Sake Festival) which draws crowds of between 100,000-200,000 revelers and sake connoisseurs before the brewing season (October–March) begins.
