= Toyosaka, Hiroshima =

Dissolved municipality in Hiroshima prefecture, Japan

Toyosaka (豊栄町, Toyosaka-chō) was a town located in Kamo District, Hiroshima Prefecture, Japan.

As of 2003, the town had an estimated population of 4,269 and a density of 58.83 persons per km^{2}. The total area was 72.56 km^{2}.

On February 7, 2005, Toyosaka, along with the towns of Fukutomi, Kōchi and Kurose (all from Kamo District), and the town of Akitsu (from Toyota District), was merged into the expanded city of Higashihiroshima and no longer exists as an independent municipality.
