= Fukutomi, Hiroshima =

Fukutomi 福富町
- Town
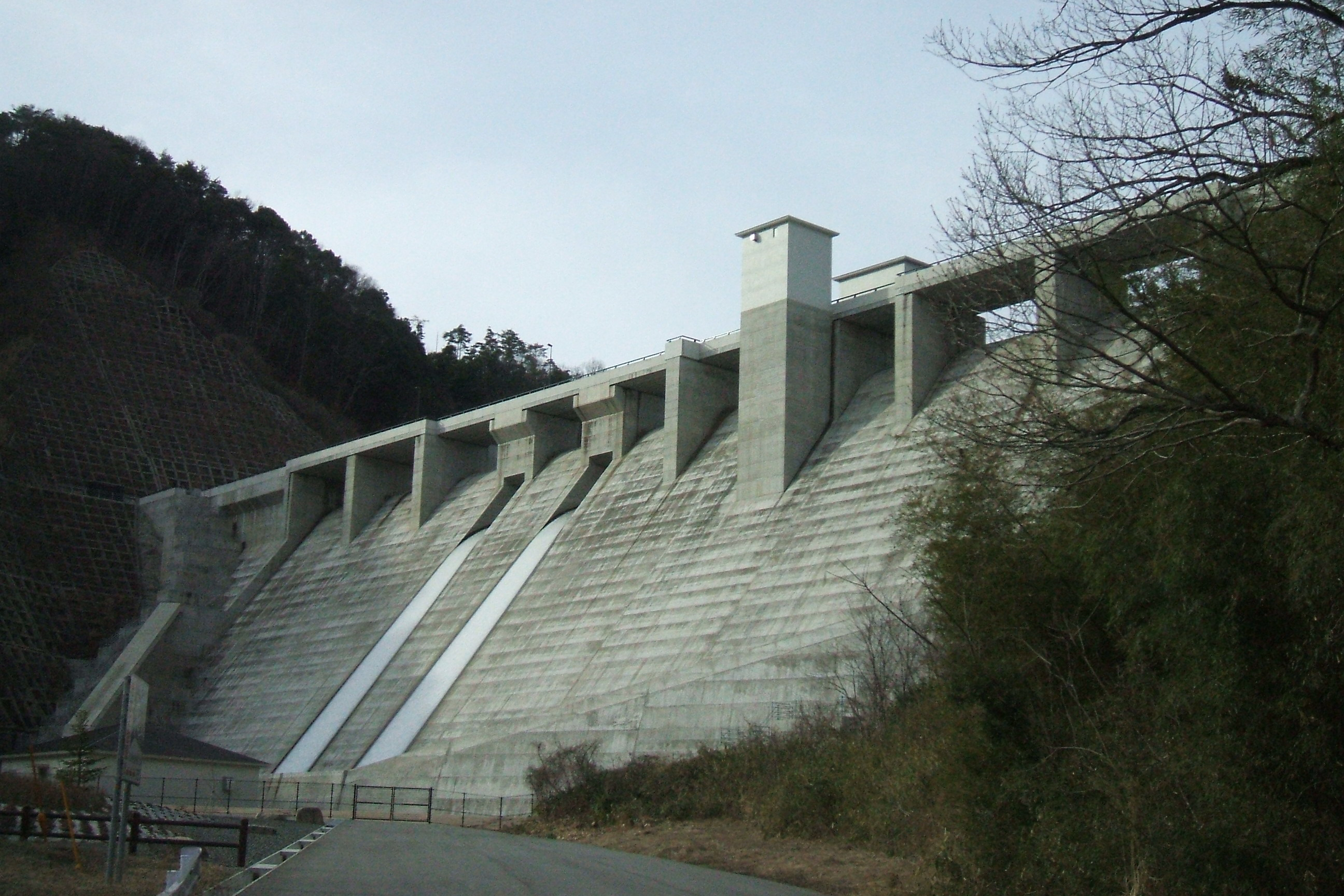
- Fukutomu Dam in Higashihiroshima

- Flag Seal
- Interactive map of Fukutomi
- Country: Japan
- Prefecture: Hiroshima
- District: Kamo

Area
  - Total: 60.71 km^{2} (23.44 sq mi)

Population (2003)
  - Total: 2,879
  - Density: 47.42/km^{2} (122.8/sq mi)

Fukutomi (福富町, Fukutomi-chō) was a town located in Kamo District, Hiroshima Prefecture, Japan.

As of 2003, the town had an estimated population of 2,879 and a density of 47.42 persons per km^{2}. The total area was 60.71 km^{2}.

On February 7, 2005, Fukutomi, along with the towns of Kōchi, Kurose and Toyosaka (all from Kamo District), and the town of Akitsu (from Toyota District), was merged into the expanded city of Higashihiroshima and no longer exists as an independent municipality.
