= Saijō (surname) =

Saijō Saijo or Saijou (written: 西城 or 西条) is a Japanese surname. Notable people with the surname include:

- Albert Saijo (1926–2011), Japanese-American poet
- Hideki Saijo (西城 秀樹; 1955–2018), Japanese singer and television personality
- Shozo Saijo (西城 正三; born 1947), Japanese boxer
- Yaso Saijō (西條 八十; 1892–1970), Japanese poet
