= Reizo Fukuhara =

Japanese footballer

Reizo Fukuhara 福原 黎三
Personal information
- Full name: Reizo Fukuhara
- Date of birth: April 2, 1931
- Place of birth: Higashihiroshima, Hiroshima, Japan
- Date of death: February 27, 1970 (aged 38)
- Place of death: Japan
- Position: Midfielder

Youth career
- Hiroshima Rijo High School
- 1949–1951: Saijo Agricultural High School

College career
| Years | Team | Apps | (Gls) |
| 1952–1955 | Tokyo University of Education | | |

International career
| 1955 | Japan | 2 | (0) |

Reizo Fukuhara (福原 黎三, Fukuhara Reizō; April 2, 1931 – February 27, 1970) was a Japanese football player. He made two appearances for the Japan national team.

On February 27, 1970, Fukuhara died of stomach cancer at the age of 38.

== National team career ==
On January 5, 1955, while a student at the Tokyo University of Education, he debuted for Japan against Burma. He played 2 games for Japan in 1955.

== National team statistics ==
Japan national team
| Year | Apps | Goals |
|---|---|---|
| 1955 | 2 | 0 |
| Total | 2 | 0 |
