= Namako wall =

Japanese architectural motif

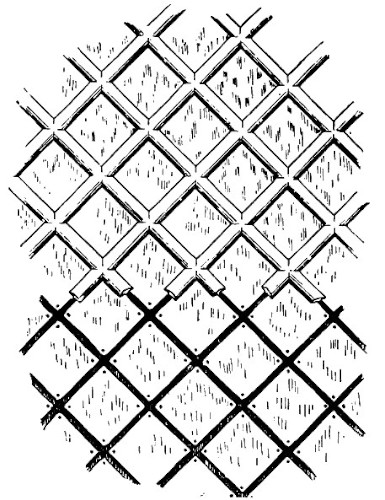
Diagram showing square tiles, on the diagonal, nailed at all four corners and grouted in mounds over the joins and nails

Namako wall or Namako-kabe (sometimes misspelled as Nameko) is a Japanese wall design widely used for vernacular houses, particularly on fireproof storehouses by the latter half of the Edo period. The namako wall is distinguished by a white grid pattern on black slate. Geographically, it was most prominent in parts of western Japan, notably the San'in region and San'yō region and, from the 19th century, further east, in the Izu Peninsula.

== Origin ==
As the base of the external walls of earthen kura storehouses is vulnerable to physical damage and damage from rain, they are often tiled to protect them. The exaggerated white clay joints that are a few centimetres wide and rounded on top remind people of namako sea cucumber.

== Modern uses ==
During the Meiji period (1868–1912), when Japan imported many Western ideas, the namako wall was used in a way that mimicked the "bricks and mortar" style of these countries. For example, Kisuke Shimizu's Tsukiji Hotel for foreigners in Tokyo Bay (completed in 1868) had namako walls that stretched from the ground to the eaves.

The Misono-za kabuki theatre in Nagoya features a modern namako pattern on the facade.

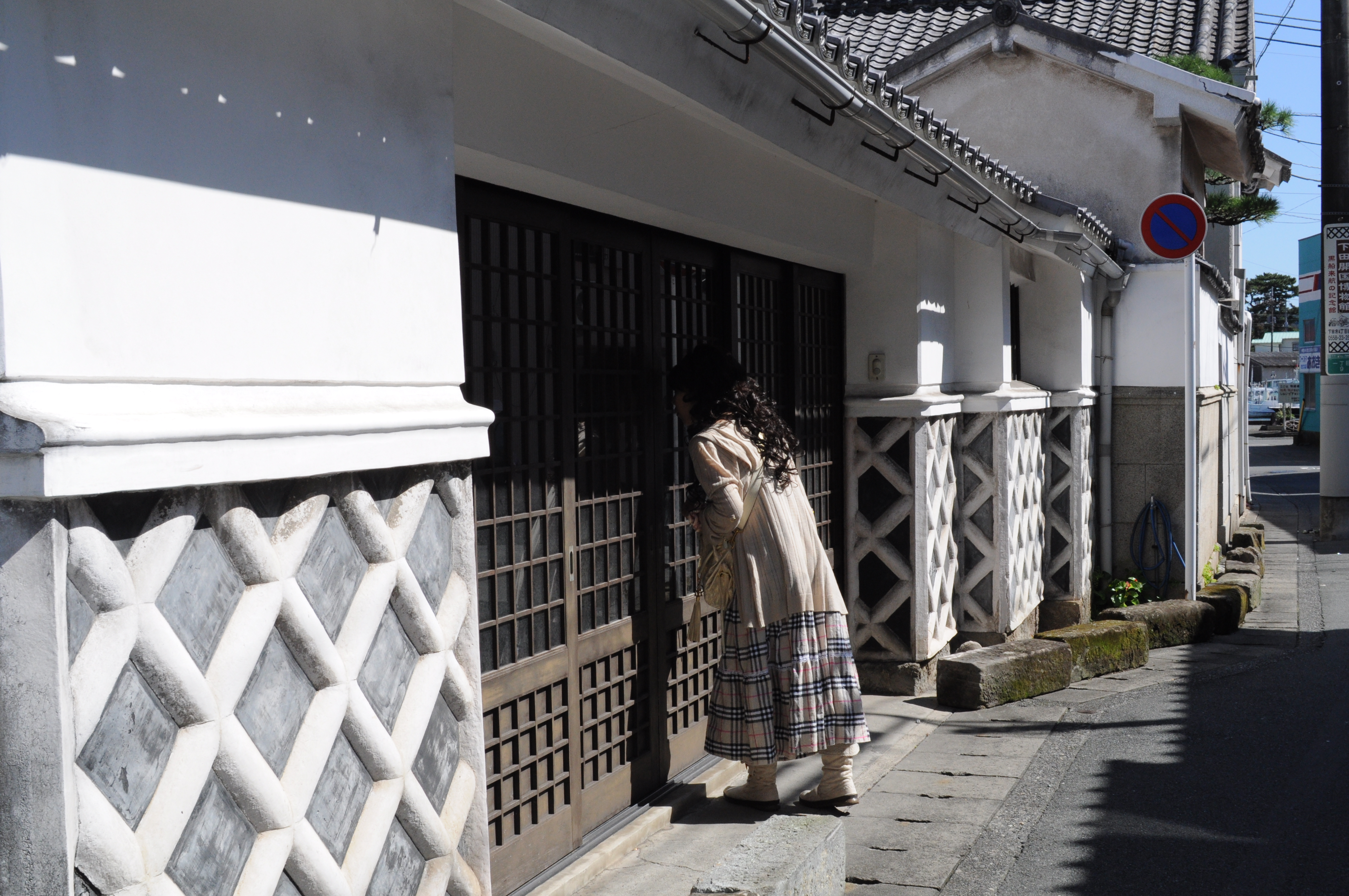
Blue-grey-purple tiles, plain, in an outdoor dado

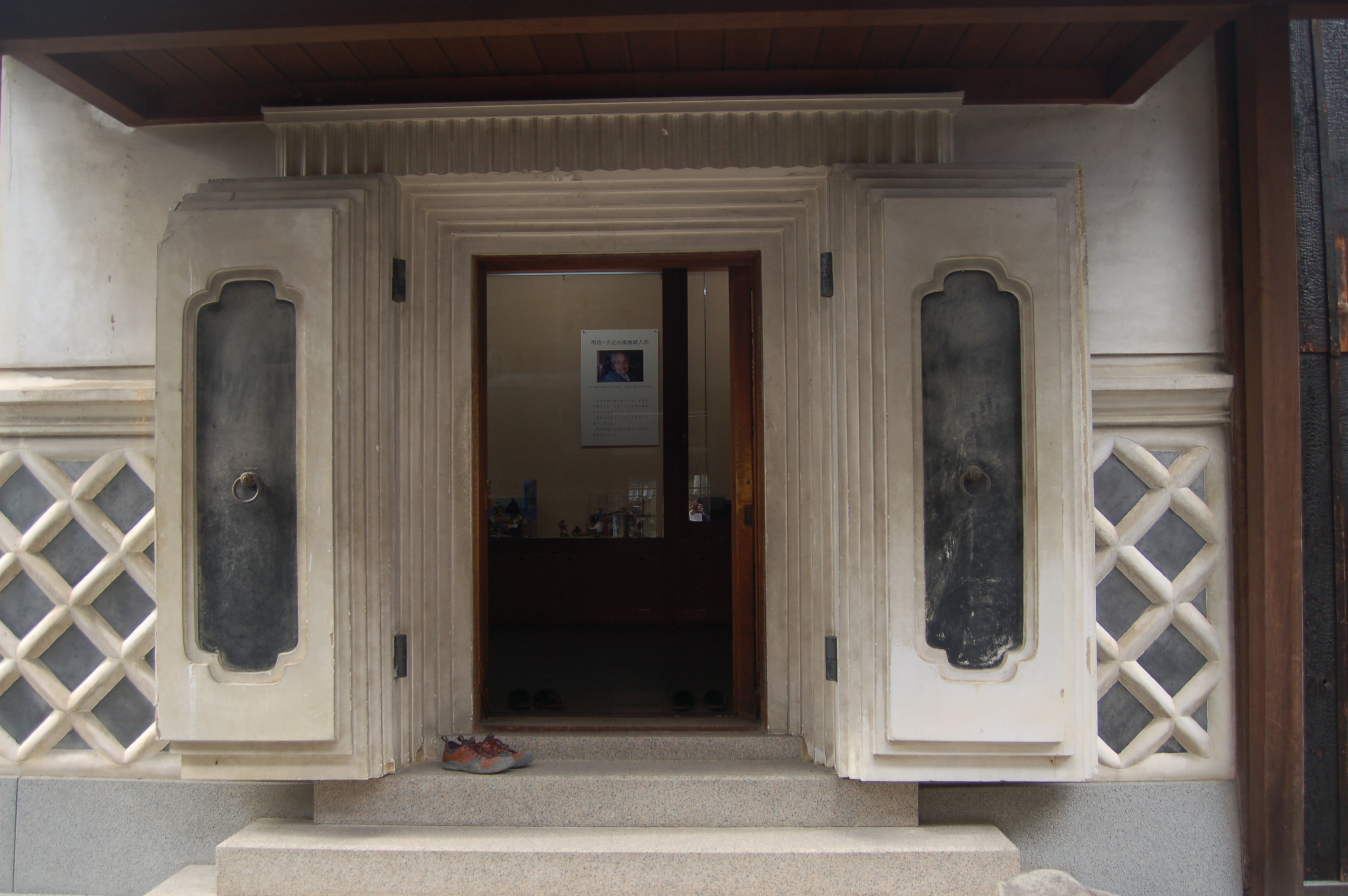
Kura (storehouse) in Tsuyama on the Izumo Kaido road showing diagonal namako tiling

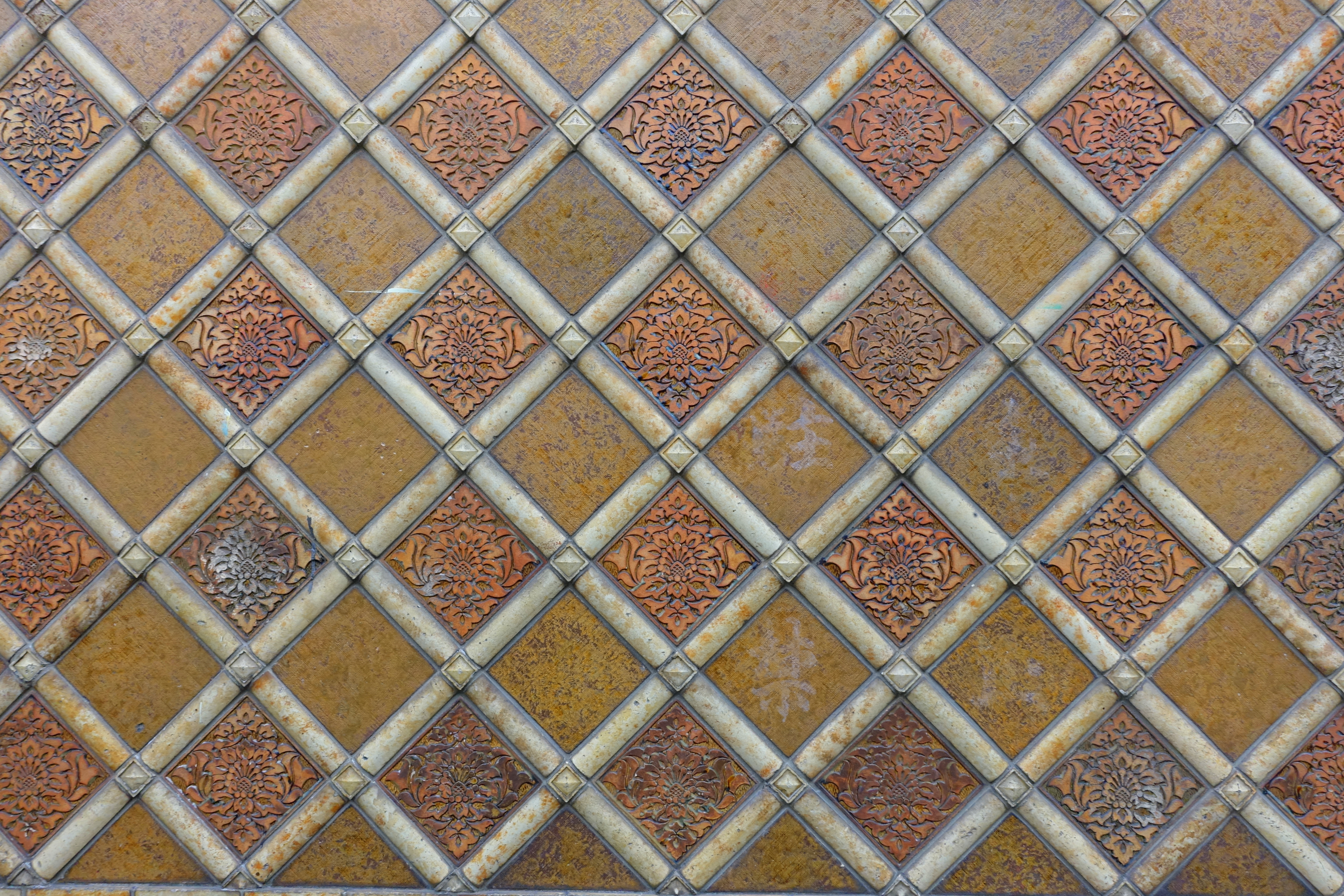
Wall of the Pontochō Kaburenjō Theater in Kyoto

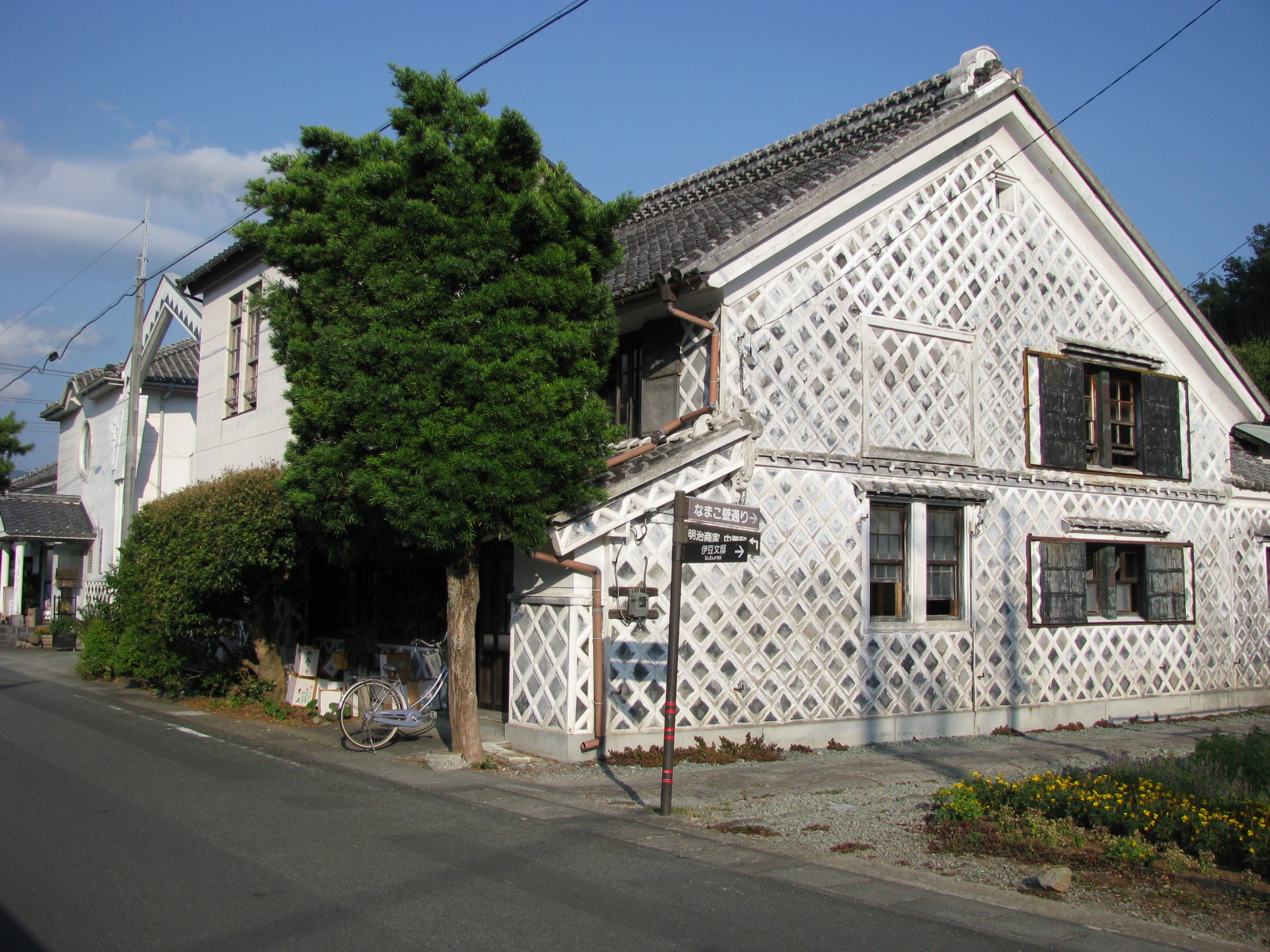
Namako wall in Matsuzaki, Shizuoka

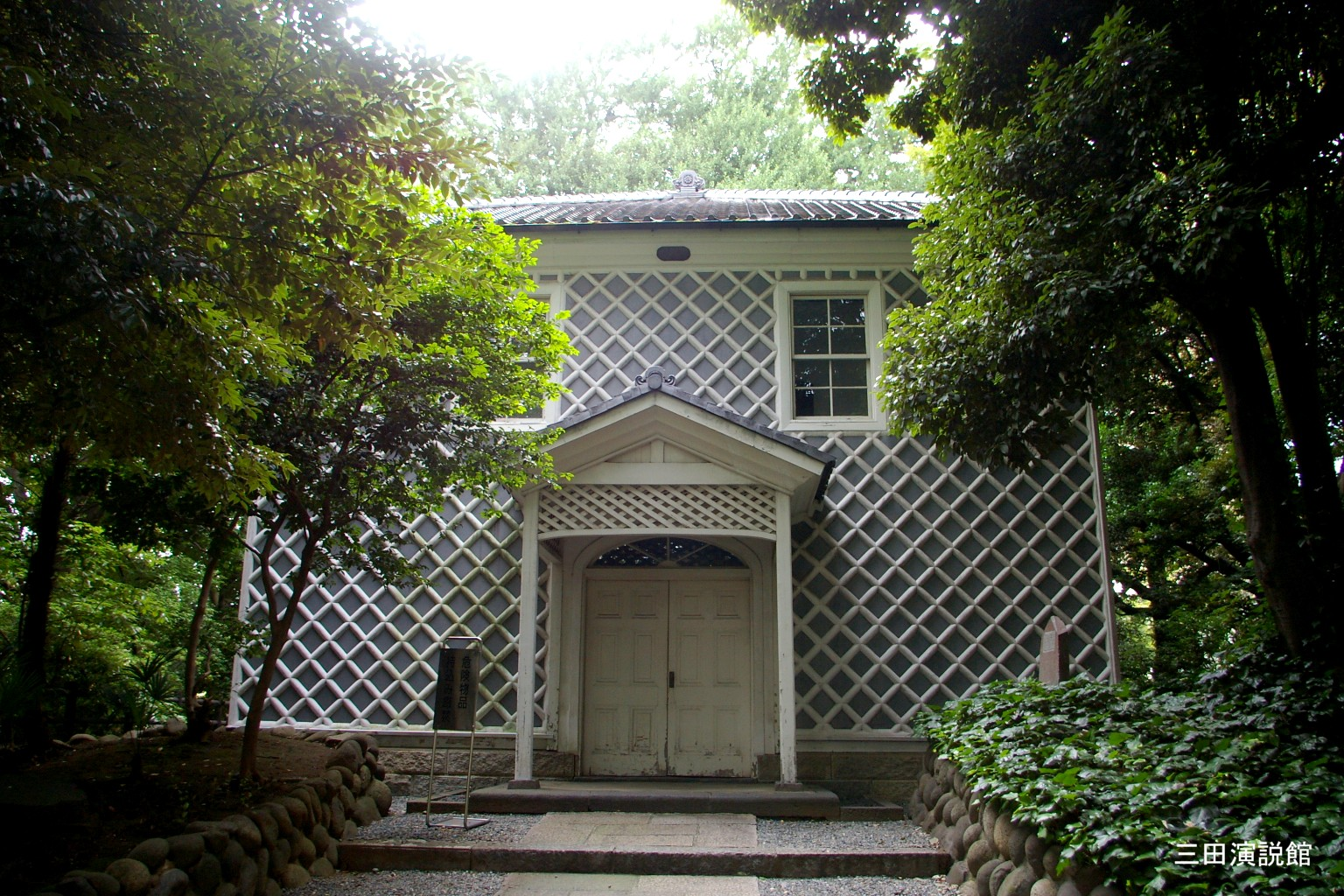
Keio Gijyuku Enzetsu kan (Speech hall)

== See also ==
- Japanese wall

== General and cited references ==
- Itō, Teiji (1980). Kura: Design and Tradition of the Japanese Storehouse. Madrona Publishers.
- Stewart, David B. (2002). The Making of a Modern Japanese Architecture, from the Founders to Shinohara and Isozaki. Kodansha International.
