= Index of Japan-related articles (K) =

This page lists Japan-related articles with romanized titles beginning with the letter K. For names of people, please list by surname (i.e., "Tarō Yamada" should be listed under "Y", not "T"). Please also ignore particles (e.g. "a", "an", "the") when listing articles (i.e., "A City with No People" should be listed under "City").

== Ka ==
- Kabuki
- Kadena, Okinawa
- Kadogawa, Miyazaki
- Kadoma, Osaka
- Kaga, Japanese aircraft carrier
- Kaga Domain
- Kaga, Ishikawa
- Kaga Province
- Takeshi Kaga
- Kagami, Kochi (Kami)
- Kagami, Kochi (Tosa)
- Kagami, Kumamoto
- Kagamino, Okayama
- Kagawa District, Kagawa
- Kagawa Prefecture
- Kagawa, Kagawa
- Kagerou (band)
- Kagome Higurashi
- Kagome Kagome
- Kagoshima District, Kagoshima
- Kagoshima Main Line
- Kagoshima Prefecture
- Kagoshima, Kagoshima
- Kagura
- Kagura (Azumanga Daioh)
- Kaho District, Fukuoka
- Kaho, Fukuoka
- Kahoku, Ishikawa
- Kahoku, Kōchi
- Kahoku, Kumamoto
- Kai Province
- Kai, Yamanashi
- Kaibara Ekken
- Kaibara, Hyogo
- Kaibun
- Kaichō
- Kaifu District, Tokushima
- Toshiki Kaifu
- Kaifu, Tokushima
- Kaigan Line
- Kaiji Kawaguchi
- Kaiju
- Kaikei
- Kaiketsu Zorori
- Kaiko Takeshi
- Kaimon, Kagoshima
- Kainan, Tokushima
- Kainan, Wakayama
- Michiru Kaioh
- Kaiso District, Wakayama
- Kaita, Fukuoka
- Kaita, Hiroshima
- Kaizen
- Kaizu District, Gifu
- Kaizu, Gifu
- Motojirō Kajii
- Kajiki, Kagoshima
- Yuki Kajiura
- Kajukenbo
- Kakaji, Ōita
- Kakamigahara, Gifu
- Kake, Hiroshima
- Kakegawa, Shizuoka
- Kakeya set
- Kakeya, Shimane
- Kakigōri
- Kakinoki, Shimane
- Kakinomoto no Hitomaro
- Kako District, Hyogo
- Kakogawa, Hyogo
- Michio Kaku
- Kakuda, Miyagi
- Kama (weapon)
- Kamaboko
- Kamae, Ōita
- Kamagari, Hiroshima
- Kamagaya, Chiba
- Kamaishi, Iwate
- Kamakura, Kanagawa
- Kamakura period
- Kamakura shogunate
- Kamen Rider
- Kameoka, Kyoto
- Kameyama, Mie
- Kami
- Kami District, Kōchi
- Kami, Hyōgo (Mikata)
- Kami, Hyōgo (Taka)
- Kamifukuoka, Saitama
- Kamigori, Hyogo
- Kamiita, Tokushima
- Kamiishizu, Gifu
- Kamijima, Ehime
- Kamikatsu, Tokushima
- Aya Kamikawa
- Kamikawa Subprefecture
- Kamikaze
- Kamikaze (1937 aircraft)
- Kamikaze (typhoon)
- Kamikitayama, Nara
- Kamimashiki District, Kumamoto
- Kamimine, Saga
- Kaminaka, Tokushima
- Kaminoho, Gifu
- Kaminoseki, Yamaguchi
- Kaminoyama, Yamagata
- Kamisaibara, Okayama
- Kamishibai
- Kamitakara, Gifu
- Kamitonda, Wakayama
- Kamitsue, Ōita
- Kamiukena District, Ehime
- Kamiura, Ehime
- Kamiura, Oita
- Taichi Kamiya
- Kamiyahagi, Gifu
- Kamiyaku, Kagoshima
- Kamiyama, Tokushima
- Kamo District, Gifu
- Kamo District, Hiroshima
- Kamo District, Shizuoka
- Kamo no Chōmei
- Kamo Shrine
- Kamo, Kyoto
- Kamo, Niigata
- Kamo, Okayama
- Kamo, Shimane
- Kamo, Shizuoka
- Kamogata, Okayama
- Kamogawa, Chiba
- Kamogawa, Okayama
- Kamojima, Tokushima
- Kamoto District, Kumamoto
- Kamoto, Kumamoto
- Kamou, Kagoshima
- Naoto Kan
- Kan'onji, Kagawa
- Kana
- Kanada, Fukuoka
- Yasumasa Kanada
- Kanagawa Prefecture
- Kanagi, Shimane
- Kanan, Osaka
- Kanaya, Shizuoka
- Kanaya, Wakayama
- Kanazawa, Ishikawa
- Bunko Kanazawa
- Kanbara, Shizuoka
- Kanda, Fukuoka
- Kanda Station (Fukuoka)
- Kanda Station (Tokyo)
- Kaneko Shinzaemon
- Shin Kanemaru
- Kaneyama, Gifu
- Kanezawa Sanetoki
- Kani, Gifu
- Kani District, Gifu
- Kaniyu Onsen
- Kwan-Ichi Asakawa
- Kanie, Aichi
- Kanji
- Kanji kentei
- Kanjin
- Kanjuro Shibata XX
- Kanmon Straits
- Kannabe, Hiroshima
- Kannami, Shizuoka
- Yoko Kanno
- Kannushi
- Kanō Eitoku
- Kanō school
- Kanoashi District, Shimane
- Kanon
- Kanoya, Kagoshima
- Kansai Gaidai University
- Kansai International Airport
- Kansai region
- Kantei
- Kanto Gakuin University
- Kantō region
- Kanuma, Tochigi
- Kanzaki District, Hyogo
- Kanzaki District, Saga
- Kanzaki District, Shiga
- Kanzaki, Hyogo
- Kanzaki, Saga
- Kao, Kumamoto
- Kappa (folklore)
- Karakuri ningyo
- Karaoke
- Karasu, Mie
- Karasuma Line
- Karate
- Karatsu, Saga
- Kariya, Aichi
- Hermann Roesler
- Karō
- Karōshi
- Karuta
- Kasa District, Kyoto
- Kasagi, Kyoto
- Kasahara, Gifu
- Kasai, Hyōgo
- Kasama, Ibaraki
- Kasamatsu, Gifu
- Kasaoka, Okayama
- Kasari, Kagoshima
- Kasasa, Kagoshima
- Ryō Kase
- Kaseda, Kagoshima
- Kashiba, Nara
- Kashihara, Nara
- Kashima, Fukushima
- Kashima, Ibaraki
- Kashima, Ishikawa
- Kashima, Kumamoto
- Kashima, Saga
- Kashima, Shimane
- Kashima District, Ibaraki
- Kashima District, Ishikawa
- Kashima Shin-ryu
- Kashima Shinto-ryu
- Kashima Shrine
- Kashimo, Gifu
- Kashiwa, Chiba
- Kashiwara, Osaka
- Kashiwazaki, Niigata
- Kashio River
- Ayumu Kasuga
- Kasuga, Fukuoka
- Kasuga, Gifu
- Kasuga, Hyogo
- Kasugai, Aichi
- Kasukabe, Saitama
- Kasumi, Hyogo
- Kasumigaseki
- Kasumori Station
- Kasutera
- Kasuya District, Fukuoka
- Kasuya, Fukuoka
- Kata
- Katakana
- Katana
- Katano, Osaka
- Katase River
- Tetsu Katayama
- Ukyo Katayama
- Katazome
- Daijiro Kato
- Kato District, Hyogo
- Kato Takaaki
- Katō Tomosaburō
- Katori, Chiba
- Katori District, Chiba
- Shingo Katori
- Tenshin Shōden Katori Shintō-ryū
- Katsu Kaishū
- Katsuobushi
- Katsura (tree)
- Katsura District, Tokushima
- Katsura imperial villa
- Prince Katsura
- Katsura River
- Katsura Tarō
- Katsura, Ibaraki
- Katsura, Kyoto
- Katsura, Tokushima
- Katsura-no-miya
- Hoshino Katsura
- Masakazu Katsura
- Masako Katsura
- Katsuta District, Okayama
- Katsuta, Okayama
- Katsuragi, Wakayama
- Katsuren, Okinawa
- Katsushika, Tokyo
- Katsuura, Chiba
- Katsuyama, Fukui
- Katsuyama, Fukuoka
- Katsuyama, Okayama
- Yasunari Kawabata
- Kawabe District, Hyogo
- Kawabe, Ehime
- Kawabe, Gifu
- Kawabe, Wakayama
- Kawachi Province
- Kawachinagano, Osaka
- Kawage, Mie
- Kawagoe, Mie
- Kawagoe, Saitama
- Yoriko Kawaguchi
- Kawaguchi, Saitama
- Kawahara, Tottori
- Kawai, Nara
- Kawai Gyokudo
- Kawaii
- Kenji Kawai
- Kawajiri, Hiroshima
- Kawakami, Nagano
- Kawakami, Nara
- Kawakami, Okayama (Kawakami)
- Kawakami, Okayama (Maniwa)
- Kawakami, Yamaguchi
- Kawakami District, Hokkaidō
- Kawakami District, Okayama
- Kawakami Gensai
- Hiromi Kawakami
- Juria Kawakami
- Kenji Kawakami
- Kenshin Kawakami
- Kiyoshi Kawakami
- Masashi Kawakami
- Otojirō Kawakami
- Tomoko Kawakami
- Kawaminami, Miyazaki
- Kawamoto, Shimane
- Kawanabe District, Kagoshima
- Kawanabe, Kagoshima
- Miyuki Kawanaka
- Kawane, Shizuoka
- Kawanishi Aircraft Company
- Kawanishi H6K
- Kawanishi H8K
- Kawanishi N1K-J
- Kawanishi, Hyōgo
- Kawanishi, Nara
- Kawanoe, Ehime
- Kawara, Fukuoka
- Kawaramachi Station
- Kawasaki Heavy Industries
- Kawasaki Ki-56
- Kawasaki Ki-61
- Kawasaki KLR650
- Kawasaki motorcycles
- Kawasaki, Fukuoka
- Kawasaki, Kanagawa
- Naomi Kawase
- Kawashima Yoshiko
- Kawashima, Gifu
- Kawashima, Tokushima
- Kawasoe, Saga
- Kawauchi, Ehime
- Kawaue, Gifu
- Kawaura, Kumamoto
- Kawazu, Shizuoka
- Kaya, Kyoto
- Kayakujutsu
- Kayo, Okayama
- Yoshihiko Kazamaru
- Kazo, Saitama
- Kazoku
- Kazuno, Akita
- Kazusa Province

== Kd ==
- KDDI

== Ke ==
- Kegon
- Keicar
- Keido Fukushima
- Keihin-Tōhoku Line
- Keihoku, Kyoto
- Keiko
- Keio
- Keio Corporation
- Keio Hachiōji Station
- Keiō Line
- Keio Shonan Fujisawa Junior and Senior High School
- Keio University
- Keiretsu
- Keirin
- Keisaku
- Keisen, Fukuoka
- Kemari
- Kenchō-ji
- Kendo
- Kenjutsu
- Kenkai
- Kenmu Restoration
- Kenpo
- Kenroku-en
- Kenshin Dragon Quest: Yomigaerishi Densetsu no Ken
- Kensho
- Kesen District, Iwate
- Kesennuma, Miyagi
- Ketaka District, Tottori
- Ketaka, Tottori
- Ash Ketchum

== Ki ==
- Ki no Tsurayuki
- Ki Society
- Kiai
- Kibi District, Okayama
- Kibi, Wakayama
- Kid Icarus
- Kid's Story
- Kido Takayoshi
- Kigo
- Kiho, Mie
- Kihoku, Ehime
- Kihoku, Kagoshima
- Kii Province
- Kiinagashima, Mie
- Kiire, Kagoshima
- Kijo, Miyazaki
- Kikai, Kagoshima
- Hiroh Kikai
- Kiki's Delivery Service
- Kikkoman Corporation
- Kikuchi District, Kumamoto
- Kikuchi, Kumamoto
- Kan Kikuchi
- Moa Kikuchi
- Kikugawa, Shizuoka
- Kikugawa, Yamaguchi
- Kikuka, Kumamoto
- Kikuma, Ehime
- Kikusui, Kumamoto
- Kikuyo, Kumamoto
- Kikyo
- Kill Bill
- Kim Saryan
- Kimagure Orange Road
- Kimba the White Lion
- Kimi ga Nozomu Eien
- Kimi ga Yo
- Kimita, Hiroshima
- Kimitsu, Chiba
- Kimono
- Kimotsuki District, Kagoshima
- Kimpusen-ji
- Ihei Kimura
- Kimura Ihei Award
- Takuya Kimura
- Kimura spider
- Kinmon Incident

== Ki (cont'd) ==
- Kin, Okinawa
- King Cold
- King Ghidorah
- King Gidora
- King K Rool
- King Kong vs. Godzilla
- The King of Fighters
- The King of Fighters: Evolution
- King Records
- Kingdom Hearts
- Kingdom Hearts II
- Kingdom Hearts: Chain of Memories
- Kinhin
- Kinjite
- Kinkaku-ji
- Kinki Kids
- Makoto Kino
- Kino's Journey
- Kinomoto, Shiga
- Kinosaki District, Hyogo
- Kinosaki, Hyogo
- Kinoshita Mokutaro
- Kinpo, Kagoshima
- Kintarō
- Kintetsu Group Holdings
- Kintetsu Railway
- Kintetsu-Hatta Station
- Kira, Aichi
- Kireji
- Kirigami
- Kirigami (Soto Zen)
- Kirin Brewery Company
- Kirin Cup
- Kirishima, Kagoshima (town)
- Kirishima, Kagoshima (city)
- Kiryu, Gunma
- Kisa, Hiroshima
- Kisaragi
- Kisarazu, Chiba
- Kisawa, Tokushima
- Kisei, Mie
- Nobusuke Kishi
- Kishigawa, Wakayama
- Kishima District, Saga
- Kishimoto, Tottori
- Yukito Kishiro
- Kishiwada, Osaka
- Kiso Mountains
- Kisogawa, Aichi
- Kisosaki, Mie
- Kisuki, Shimane
- Kita District, Ehime
- Kita District, Kagawa
- Ikki Kita
- Kita-ku, Sapporo
- Kita-Osaka Kyuko Railway
- Kita, Tokyo
- Kitaamabe District, Ōita
- Kitadaito, Okinawa
- Kitagata, Gifu
- Kitagata, Saga
- Kitagawa, Kōchi
- Kitagawa, Miyazaki
- Kitago, Higashiusuki, Miyazaki
- Kitago, Minaminaka, Miyazaki
- Kitago, Higashiusuki, Miyazaki
- Kitahara Hakushū
- Kitahata, Saga
- Kitahiroshima, Hokkaidō
- Kitaibaraki, Ibaraki
- Kitajima, Tokushima
- Saburō Kitajima
- Kitakami, Iwate
- Kitakata, Fukushima
- Kitakata, Miyazaki
- Kitakatsuragi District, Nara
- Kitakuwada District, Kyoto
- Kitakyushu
- Kitami, Hokkaidō
- Kitamorokata District, Miyazaki
- Kitamoto, Saitama
- Kanji Kitamura
- Ryuhei Kitamura
- Kitamuro District, Mie
- Kitanakagusuku, Okinawa
- Kitano, Fukuoka
- Takeshi Kitano
- Kitashigeyasu, Saga
- Kitashitara District, Aichi
- Kitaura, Miyazaki
- Kitauwa District, Ehime
- Kitayama, Wakayama
- Kito, Tokushima
- Kitsuki, Ōita
- Kitsune
- Kiyama, Saga
- Kiyokawa, Ōita
- Kiyomi, Gifu
- Kiyone, Okayama
- Kiyosu, Aichi (city)
- Kiyosu, Aichi (Nishikasugai)
- Kiyotake, Miyazaki
- Kiwa, Mie
- Kiyose, Tokyo
- Kiyoura Keigo
- Kiyozawa Manshi
- Kizu, Kyoto

== Kn ==
- Knight Sabers
- Knock Yokoyama

== Ko ==
- Ko-hyoteki class submarine
- Koan
- Masaki Kobayashi
- Kobayashi Takiji
- Kobayashi, Miyazaki
- Kobe
- Kobe Airport
- Kobe Electric Railway
- Kobe Line
- Kobe Municipal Subway
- Kobe Municipal Transportation Bureau
- Kobe New Transit
- Kobe Rapid Railway
- Kobe Station
- Kobe University
- Kōchi, Hiroshima
- Kōchi, Kōchi
- Kōchi Prefecture
- Kochinda, Okinawa
- Kochira Katsushika-ku Kameari Kōen-mae Hashutsujo
- Kumi Koda
- Kodachi
- Kodaira, Tokyo
- Kodama (Shinkansen)
- Kodama (spirit)
- Kodera, Hyogo
- Kodomo no hi
- Koei
- Kofu, Yamanashi
- Kofu, Tottori
- Kōfuku-ji
- Kofun
- Kofun period
- Koga (InuYasha)
- Koga (kuge)
- Koga, Fukuoka
- Koga, Ibaraki
- Dan Kogai
- Kogal
- Koganei, Tokyo
- Koge, Tottori
- Kogo Noda
- Kohaku
- Kōhoku, Saga
- Kohoku, Shiga
- Koi
- Koinobori
- Kiyoshi Koishi
- Koishiwara, Fukuoka
- Koiso Kuniaki
- Junichiro Koizumi
- Kyōko Koizumi
- Takashi Koizumi
- Kojiki
- Kojima District, Okayama
- Hideo Kojima
- Kojima Usui
- Koka District, Shiga
- Koka, Shiga
- Kokan Shiren
- Kokawa, Wakayama
- Kōkei (monk)
- Kōkei (sculptor)
- Kokin Gumi
- Kokin Wakashū
- Kokonoe, Ōita
- Kokoro
- Koku
- Kokubu, Kagoshima
- Kokubun-ji
- Kokubun-ji (Osaka)
- Kokubunji, Tokyo
- Kokubunji, Kagawa
- Kokubunji, Tochigi
- Kokubunji, Kagawa
- Kokuchūkai
- Kokufu, Gifu
- Kokufu, Tottori
- Kokura
- Kokura Station
- Kokyo
- Komachi (Shinkansen)
- Komae, Tokyo
- Komagane, Nagano
- Komaki, Aichi
- Komatsu
- Komatsu, Ehime
- Rika Komatsu
- Komatsushima, Tokushima
- Komono, Mie
- Komoro, Nagano
- Kondo effect
- Konjaku Monogatarishū
- Chiaki J. Konaka
- Konami
- Konami Code
- Konan, Aichi
- Konan, Kagawa
- Kōnan, Kōchi
- Konan, Saitama
- Konan, Shiga
- Kon-dō
- Kondō Isami
- Koji Kondo
- Nobutake Kondō
- Konica Minolta
- Kōnin (era)
- Konko, Okayama
- Konoe family
- Fumimaro Konoe
- Kōnosu, Saitama
- Kōnu District, Hiroshima
- Kōnu, Hiroshima
- Koopa Kid
- Koopa Troopa
- Kora, Shiga
- Hirokazu Koreeda
- Korematsu v. United States
- Kōriyama, Fukushima
- Koriyama, Kagoshima
- Koro-pok-guru
- Koryo, Nara
- Koryo, Shimane
- Koryū
- Kosa, Kumamoto
- Kosai, Shizuoka
- Kosei, Shiga
- Koseki
- Koshi, Kumamoto
- Masatoshi Koshiba
- Koshigaya, Saitama
- Kōshinetsu region
- Kosuge Tadamoto
- Kota, Aichi
- Kotake, Fukuoka
- Koto (musical instrument)
- Koto, Shiga
- Kōtō, Tokyo
- Kotoamatsukami
- Kotohira, Kagawa
- Kōtoku-in
- Shusui Kotoku
- Kotonami, Kagawa
- Koxinga
- Koya, Wakayama
- Koyadaira, Tokushima
- Koyaguchi, Wakayama
- Koyama, Kagoshima
- Koyu District, Miyazaki
- Koza, Wakayama
- Kozagawa, Wakayama
- Kozakai, Aichi
- Kozan, Hiroshima
- Kōzuke Province
- Kozuki, Hyogo

== Kr ==
- Adam Johann von Krusenstern

== Ku ==
- Kubokawa, Kōchi
- Kubota, Saga
- Kubotan
- Kuchiwa, Hiroshima
- Kudamatsu, Yamaguchi
- Kudoyama, Wakayama
- Kudzu
- Kuga District, Yamaguchi
- Kuga, Yamaguchi
- Kugino, Kumamoto
- Kuguno, Gifu
- Kui, Hiroshima
- Kuji, Iwate
- Kujō family
- Kujō Yoritsugu
- Kujō Yoritsune
- Kujū, Ōita
- Kuka, Yamaguchi
- Kūkai
- Kuki Shūzō
- Kuki, Saitama
- Kukishin Ryu
- Kuma District, Kumamoto
- Kuma, Ehime
- Kuma, Kumamoto
- Kuma River (Japan)
- Kumabito
- Kumagaya, Saitama
- Kumage District, Kagoshima
- Kumage District, Yamaguchi
- Kumakōgen, Ehime
- Kumamoto Castle
- Kumamoto Prefecture
- Kumamoto University
- Kumamoto, Kumamoto
- Kumano, Mie
- Kumano, Hiroshima
- Kumanogawa, Wakayama
- Kumatori, Osaka
- Kumayama, Okayama
- Kume District, Okayama
- Kume, Okayama
- Kumejima, Okinawa
- Kumenan, Okayama
- Kumite
- Kumiyama, Kyoto
- Kuni
- Kunigami District, Okinawa
- Kunigami, Okinawa
- Kunikida Doppo
- Kunimi, Ōita
- Kunisada
- Kunisaki, Ōita
- Kunitachi, Tokyo
- Kunitomi, Miyazaki
- Kuniyoshi
- Kunohe, Iwate
- Kunoichi
- Kunrei-shiki Rōmaji
- Kurahashi, Hiroshima
- Mai Kuraki
- Kurama-dera
- Tadashi Kuranari
- Kurashiki, Okayama
- Kuratake, Kumamoto
- Kurate District, Fukuoka
- Kurate, Fukuoka
- Kurayoshi, Tottori
- Kure, Hiroshima
- Kuril Islands
- Kuril Islands dispute
- Kurino, Kagoshima
- Kuririn
- Kurobe, Toyama
- Fukumi Kuroda
- Kuroda Kiyotaka
- Kurodasho, Hyogo
- Kurogi, Fukuoka
- Kurohone, Gunma
- Kuroishi, Aomori
- Kuroiso, Tochigi
- Kisho Kurokawa
- Kuroki Tamemoto
- Kuroko
- Akira Kurosawa
- Kiyoshi Kurosawa
- Minamo Kurosawa
- Kurosawa's Dreams
- Kurose, Hiroshima
- Kuroshima Denji
- Kurotaki, Nara
- Kuru Kuru Kururin
- Kurume, Fukuoka
- Kurushima-Kaikyō_Bridge
- Kusaba Haisen
- Yayoi Kusama
- Kusanagi
- Kusarigama
- Kusatsu, Gunma
- Kusatsu, Shiga
- Kuse District, Kyoto
- Kuse, Okayama
- Kusha-shū
- Kushi
- Kushihara, Gifu
- Kushikino, Kagoshima
- Kushima, Miyazaki
- Kushimoto, Wakayama
- Kushira, Kagoshima
- Kushiro, Hokkaidō
- Kushiro Subprefecture
- Kūsō Kagaku Dokuhon
- Kusu District, Ōita
- Kusu, Mie
- Kusu, Ōita
- Kusudama
- Kusunai
- Kusunoki, Yamaguchi
- Ken Kutaragi
- Kutchan, Hokkaidō
- Kutsuki, Shiga
- Kineo Kuwabara
- Shisei Kuwabara
- Kuwana, Mie
- Kuwana District, Mie
- Houko Kuwashima
- Kūya
- Kuze, Gifu

== Ky ==
- Kyōbashi, Tokyo
- Kyōbashi Station (Tokyo)
- Kyobashi Station (Osaka)
- Kyocera
- Kyodo News
- Kyoho Reforms
- Kyokushi, Kumamoto
- Kyokushin
- Kyotanabe, Kyoto
- Kyoto Common Lisp
- Kyoto Municipal Transportation Bureau
- Kyoto Prefecture
- Kyoto
- Kyoto Line (Kintetsu)
- Kyoto Prize
- Kyoto Protocol
- Kyoto School
- Kyoto Station
- Kyoto University
- Anna Kyoyama
- Kyūdō
- Kyuragi, Saga
- Kyūshū
- Kyūshū Institute of Design
- Kyushu J7W
- Kyūshū Shinkansen
- Kyūshū University
