= Kaneko (surname) =

Kaneko (written: 金子, 金古, 兼子 or カネコ in katakana) is a Japanese surname. Notable people with the surname include:

- Akitomo Kaneko (金子 明友; born 1927), Japanese gymnast
- Atsushi Kaneko (カネコ アツシ; born 1966), Japanese manga artist
- Chihiro Kaneko (金子 千尋; born 1983), Japanese baseball player
- Kaneko Daiei (金子 大栄; 1881–1976), Japanese Buddhist philosopher
- Daiki Kaneko (金子 大毅; born 1998), Japanese footballer
- Emi Kaneko (金子 恵美; born 1965), Japanese politician
- Fumiko Kaneko (金子 文子; 1903–1926), Japanese anarchist and nihilist
- Genjirō Kaneko (金子 原二郎; born 1944), Japanese politician
- Hajime Kaneko (兼子 一; 1906–1973), Japanese jurist
- Hiromi Kaneko (金子 広美; born 1980), Japanese cyclist
- Hisashi Kaneko (金子 久; born 1959), Japanese footballer
- Hitomi Kaneko (金子 仁美), Japanese classical composer
- Kaneko Ietada (金子 家忠; 1138–1216), Japanese samurai
- Ippei Kaneko (金子 一平; 1913–1989), Japanese politician, finance minister 1978–79
- Jun Kaneko (金子 潤; born 1942), Japanese ceramic artist living in the United States
- Jutok Kaneko (1958–2007), Japanese musician
- Kazuma Kaneko (金子 一馬; born 1964), Japanese video game artist and designer
- Kazuyoshi Kaneko (金子 一義; born 1942), Japanese politician
- Kaneko Kentarō (金子 堅太郎; 1853–1942), Japanese diplomat
- Keisuke Kaneko (金子 圭輔; born 1985), Japanese baseball player
- Kuniyoshi Kaneko (金子 國義; 1936–2015), Japanese painter, illustrator and photographer
- Makoto Kaneko (disambiguation), multiple people
- Mari Kaneko (金子 真理; born 1972), Japanese karateka and mixed martial artist
- Masaaki Kaneko (金子 正明; born 1940), Japanese sport wrestler
- Masahiro Kaneko (金子 昌広; born 1991), Japanese footballer
- Masaki Kaneko (金子 雅紀; born 1992), Japanese swimmer
- Masaru Kaneko (金子 勝; born 1952), Japanese Marxian economist
- Megumi Kaneko (金子 恵美; born 1978), Japanese politician
- Misuzu Kaneko (金子 みすゞ; 1903–1930), Japanese poet and songwriter
- Mitsuharu Kaneko (金子 光晴; 1895–1975), Japanese poet and painter
- Munehiro Kaneko (金子 宗弘; born 1968), Japanese decathlete
- Noboru Kaneko (金子 昇; born 1974), Japanese actor
- Nobuaki Kaneko (金子 信昭; born 1981), Japanese drummer and actor
- Nobuo Kaneko (金子 信雄; 1923–1995), Japanese actor
- Ree Kaneko (born 1946), American artist
- Rie Kaneko (金子 理江; born 1997), Japanese gravure idol, model and singer
- Ryūichi Kaneko (金子 隆一; 1948–2021)), Japanese critic and historian of photography
- Seiji Kaneko (金古 聖司; born 1980), Japanese footballer
- Kaneko Shinzaemon (金子 新左衛門), Japanese samurai
- Shigeji Kaneko (金子 繁治; 1931–2016), Japanese boxer
- Shohei Kaneko (金子 宗平; 1937–2006), Japanese discus thrower
- Shota Kaneko (金子 翔太; born 1995), Japanese footballer
- Shusuke Kaneko (金子 修介; born 1955), Japanese screenwriter and film director
- Tadashi Kaneko (兼子 正; died 1942), Japanese World War II flying ace
- Takatoshi Kaneko (金子 貴俊; born 1978), Japanese actor
- Takeshi Kaneko (金子 丈; born 1993), Japanese baseball player
- Takuro Kaneko (金子 拓郎; born 1997), Japanese footballer
- Tōta Kaneko (金子 兜太; born 1919), Japanese writer
- Tsuyoshi Kaneko (金子 剛; born 1983), Japanese footballer
- Yasuji Kaneko (金子 安次; 1920–2010), ex-soldier of the Imperial Japanese Army, known for his extensive war crimes testimony
- Yoshinori Kaneko (金子 柱憲; born 1961), Japanese golfer
- Yōzō Kaneko (金子 養三; 1882–1941), Japanese general
- Yuji Kaneko (金子 侑司; born 1990), Japanese baseball player
- Yūki Kaneko (金子 有希; born 1987), Japanese voice actress
- Yuki Kaneko (footballer) (金子 勇樹; born 1982), Japanese footballer
- Yuki Kaneko (badminton) (金子 祐樹; born 1994), Japanese badminton player
- Yusuke Kaneko (金子 祐介; born 1976), Japanese ski jumper
- Yutaka Kaneko (footballer) (金子 豊; born 1979), Japanese footballer
- Yutaka Kaneko (wrestler) (兼子 隆; born 1933), Japanese sport wrestler
- Zenjiro Kaneko (金子 善次郎; born 1943), Japanese politician
- Isamu Kaneko (金子 勇; 1970–2013), Japanese software programmer, developer of Winny file-sharing program

== Fictional characters ==
- Show Kaneko, a character in the manga series Inubaka

== See also ==
- Josephine Conger-Kaneko, American journalist and writer
- Kaneko Station, a railway station in Iruma, Saitama Prefecture, Japan
- 4717 Kaneko, a main-belt asteroid
