= 神戸駅 =

神戸駅 may refer to the following railway stations in Japan:

- Gōdo Station (Gunma)
- Kambe Station, in Tahara
- Kōbe Station (Hyogo)

== See also ==
- Gōdo Station (disambiguation)
- Kobe Station (disambiguation)
