= Komatsu =

Komatsu may refer to:

- Komatsu (surname), a Japanese surname
- Komatsu, Ishikawa, a city in the Ishikawa prefecture in Japan
- Komatsu Airport, an airport
- Komatsu Limited, a company mostly known for manufacturing industrial machinery
- Komatsu LAV, an armoured car
- Komatsu, Ehime, a former town, merged into Saijō, Ehime
- Komatsu (Japanese restaurant), a Japanese restaurant in Yokosuka, Kanagawa, Japan
- Komatsu College, a private junior college in Komatsu, Ishikawa, Japan, established in 1988
- komatsuna, a type of vegetable from Japan

== See also ==
- Komatsu-no-miya, a cadet branch of the Japanese royal family
