= Shimanoyama Kofun =

Kofun period burial mound in Japan

- 島の山古墳 (Japanese)
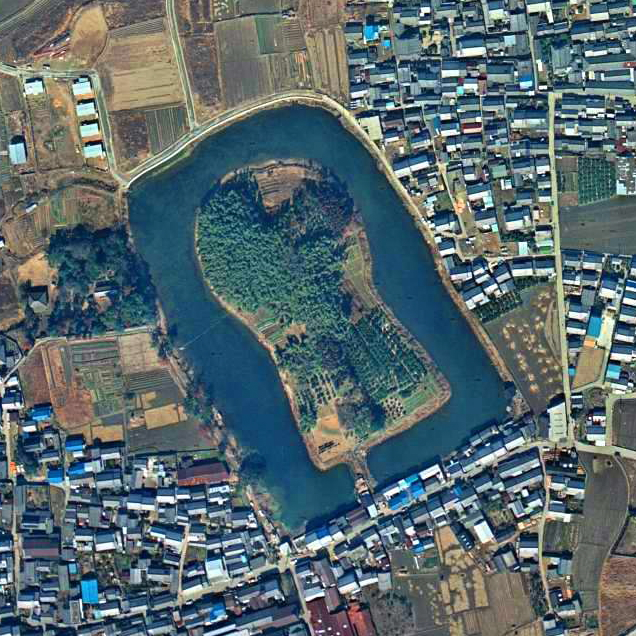
- Shimanoyama Kofun

- Shimanoyama Kofun Shimanoyama Kofun (Japan)
- Interactive map of Shimanoyama Kofun
- 34°35′2″N 135°45′46.6″E
- Type: Kofun
- Periods: Kofun period
- Location: Kawanishi, Nara, Japan
- Region: Kansai region

History
- Built: c.4th to 5th century

Site notes
- Public access: Yes (no facilities)

Shimanoyama Kofun (島の山古墳) is a burial mound, located in the Tōin neighborhood of the town of Kawanishi in the Kansai region of Japan. The tumulus was designated a National Historic Site of Japan in 2002. The items excavated from the tumulus have been collectively designated as a National Important Cultural Property.

== Overview ==
The Shimanoyama Kofun is a zenpō-kōen-fun (前方後円墳), which is shaped like a keyhole, having one square end and one circular end, when viewed from above. It is located on a slight elevation overlooking the Yamato River in the center of the Nara Basin and is one of the burial mounds that make up the northern group of the Umami Kofun cluster. It is about one kilometer east of the Ōtsukayama Kofun Cluster. The location of these tumuli is where the rivers of the Yamato Basin converge, and it is located at a key transportation point. As the shape and dimensions of the Kawai Otsukayama Tomb and the Shimanoyama Tomb are identical, these two tombs are thought to be closely related.

The Shimanoyama Kofun is a large tumulus with a current length of 190 meters, a diameter of over 105 meters at the rear, and a width of over 95 meters at the front, and is surrounded by a shield-shaped moat about 40 meters wide. There are projections on the east and west narrow parts. As the tumulus has been eroded by water from the moat, it is estimated that it was originally over 200 meters in length. Archaeological excavations were carried out in 1996, and the main part of a clay coffin was unearthed in the anterior rectangular portion. This clay coffin was constructed in a grave pit 3.4 by 10.5 meters, and is about 2 by 8.5 meters in size. It contained 7.5 meter long split bamboo-shaped wooden coffin made of Japanese umbrella pine. Inside the coffin, vermilion had been sprinkled over the area where the deceased had been placed. Some 2500 items of grave goods were recovered, including three bronze mirrors, three stone boxes, and five tubular beads that were excavated near the head, tubular beads thought to be a necklace near the chest, and a bracelet with tubular and round beads attached near the wrist, as well as an iron knife and a vertical comb. The presence of the hand beads suggests that the buried person was a woman. An excavation of the circular mound area was carried out from 1997 to 1999, and the remains of the terraced construction, fukiishi roofing stones, as well as rows of haniwa clay figures (morning glory-shaped cylindrical, house-shaped, shield-shaped, and quiver-shaped) on the first and second terraces were confirmed. In addition, during the 10th survey conducted in 2005, a vegetable basket thought to have been used for rituals was excavated from the western narrow part. There appears to have been a vertical pit entry stone burial chamber in the posterior circular mound, but it was destroyed by grave robbery. The monolithic ceiling stones of the burial chamber were brought to this location from a quarry in Hyogo Prefecture.

Judging from the main body, grave goods, and haniwa clay figures, this tumulus was built around the end of the 4th century, and is thought to be the tomb of a powerful chief in the Nara Basin due to its large size and abundant grave goods. It is about a 20-minute walk from Yūzaki Station on the Kintetsu Kashihara Line.

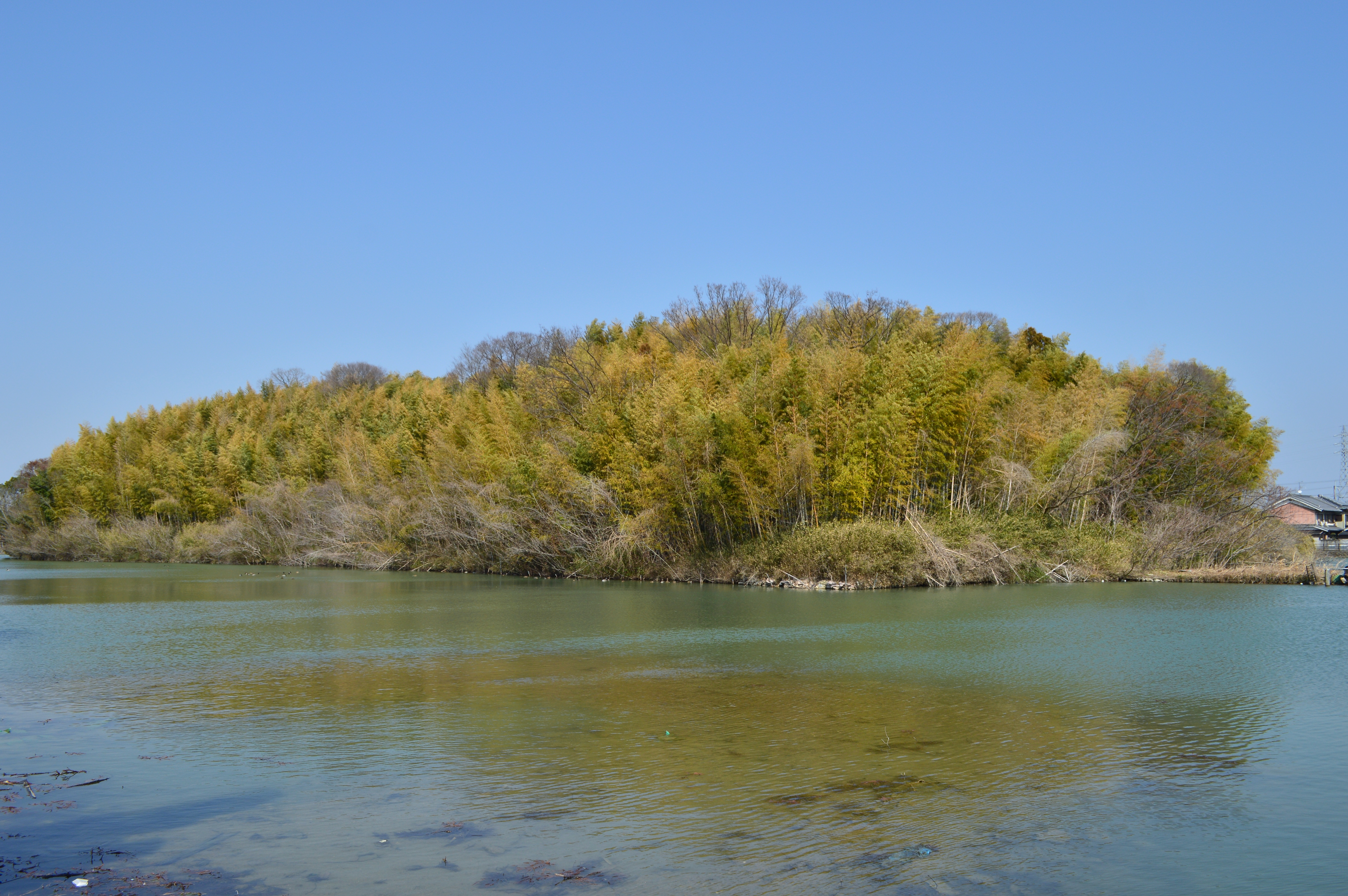
Shimanoyama Kofun

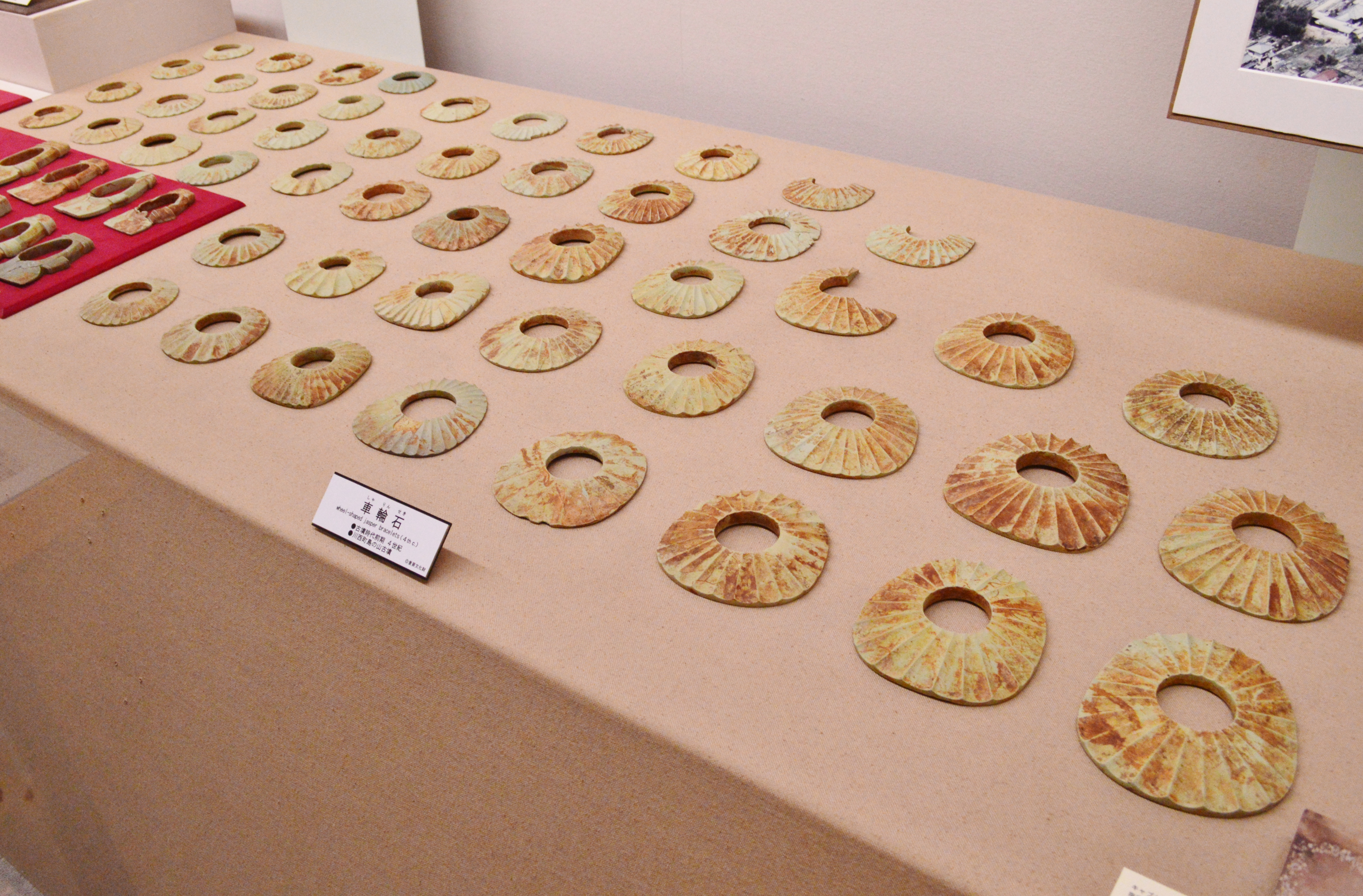
Wheel stone excavated from Shimanoyama tumulus

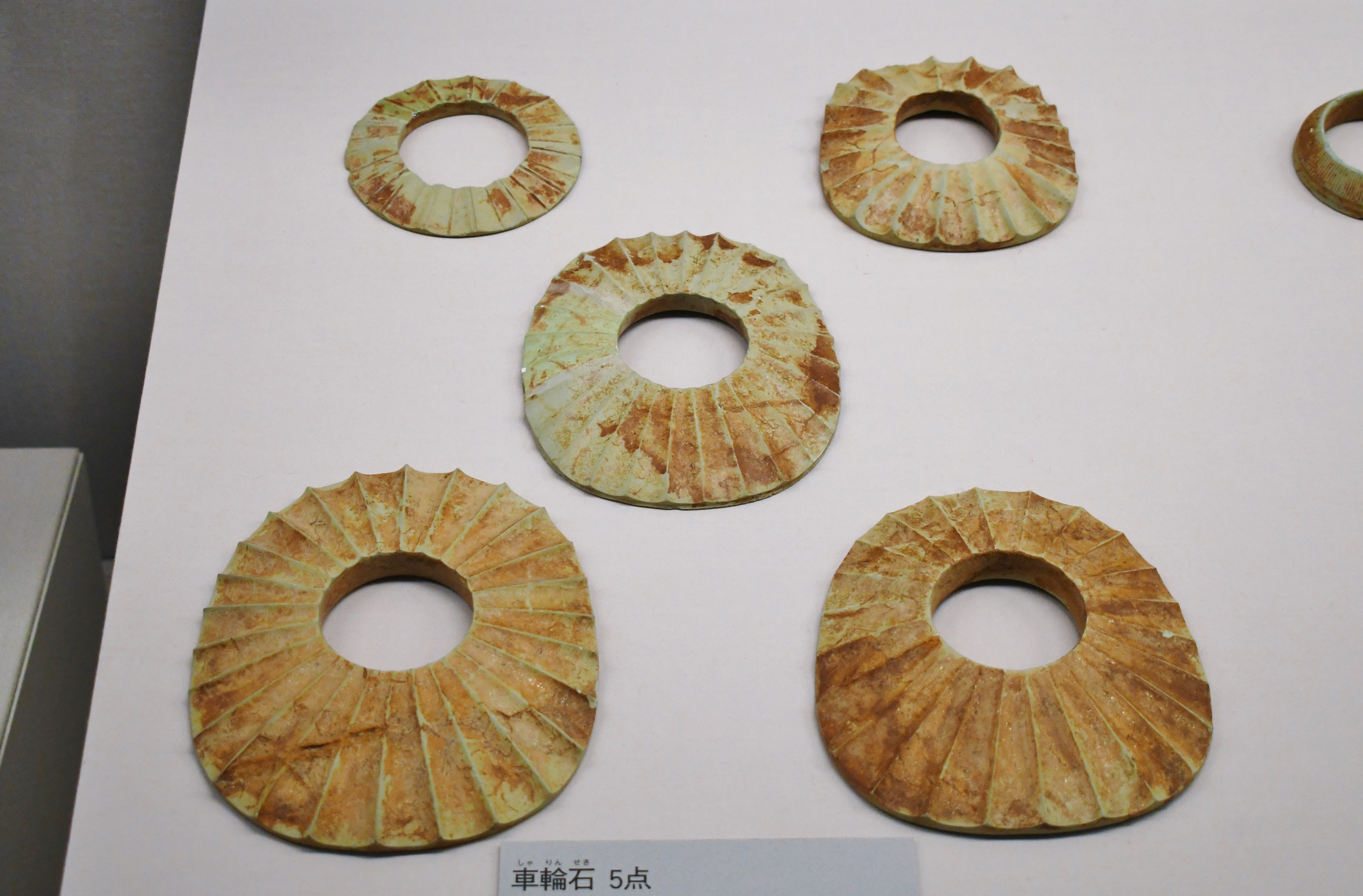
Wheel stone excavated from Shimanoyama tumulus

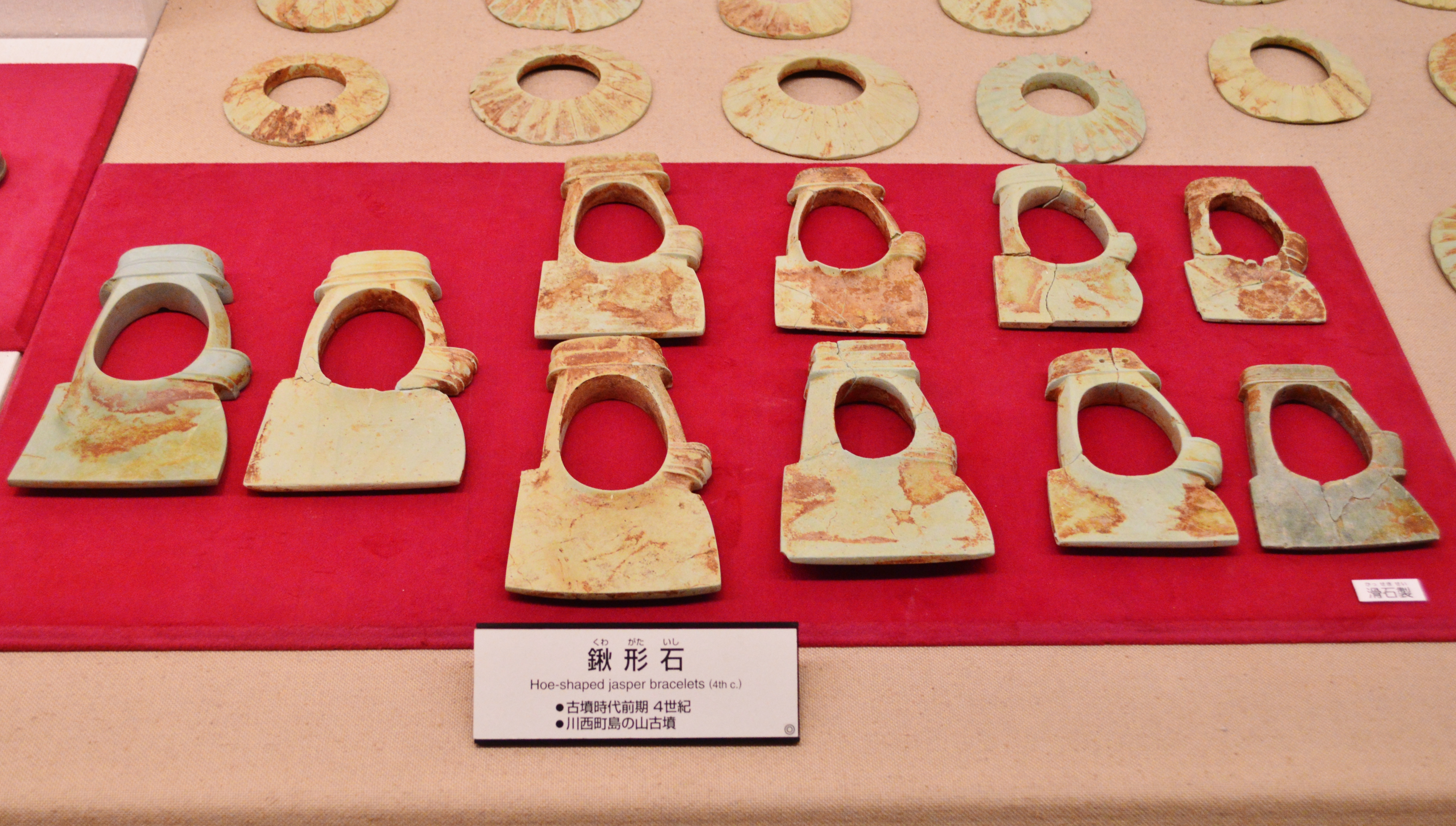
Huwagata stone excavated from Shimanoyama tumulus

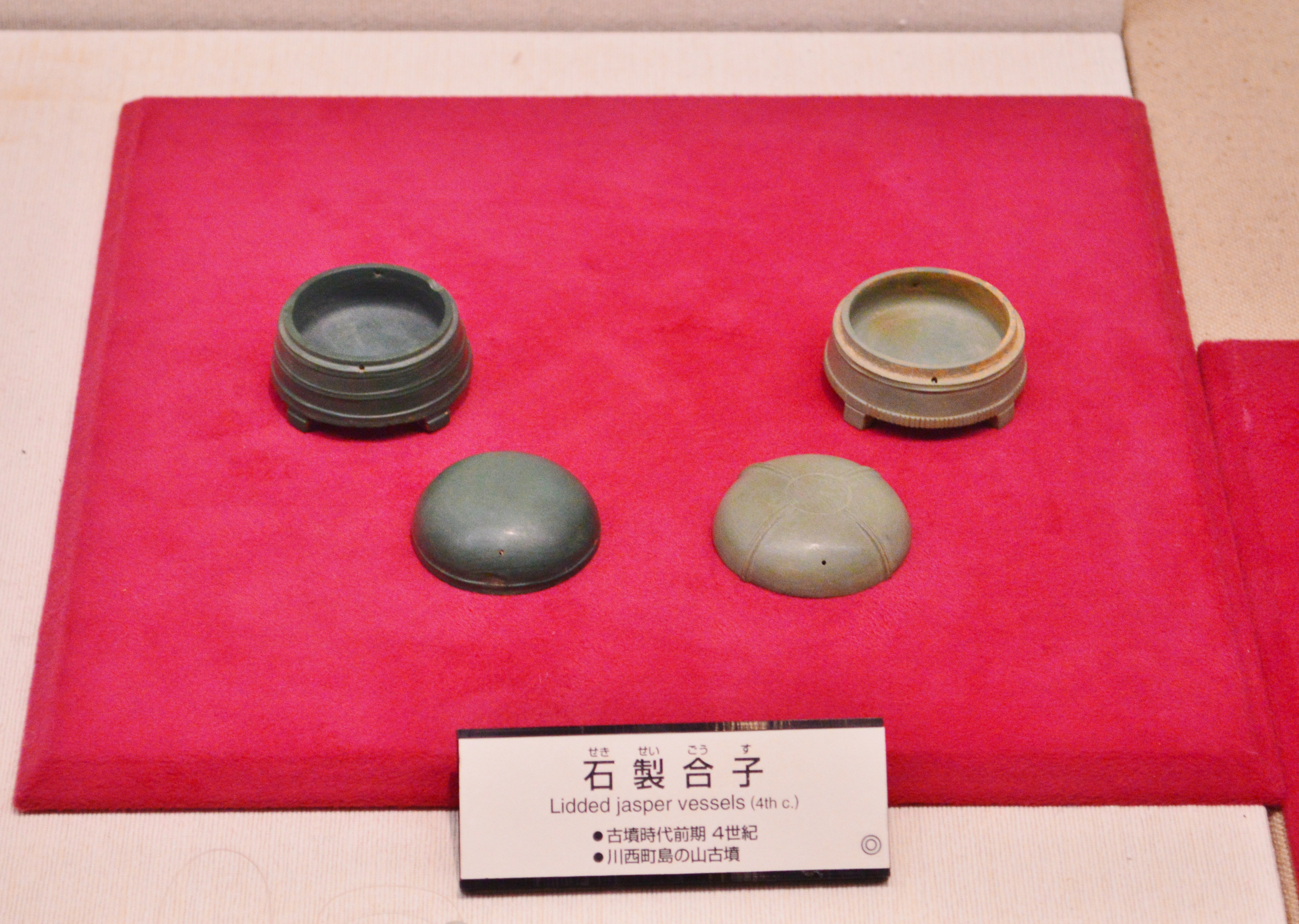
Stone bowl excavated from Shimanoyama tumulus

== See also ==
- List of Historic Sites of Japan (Nara)
