= Kanji Kitamura =

Japanese businessman

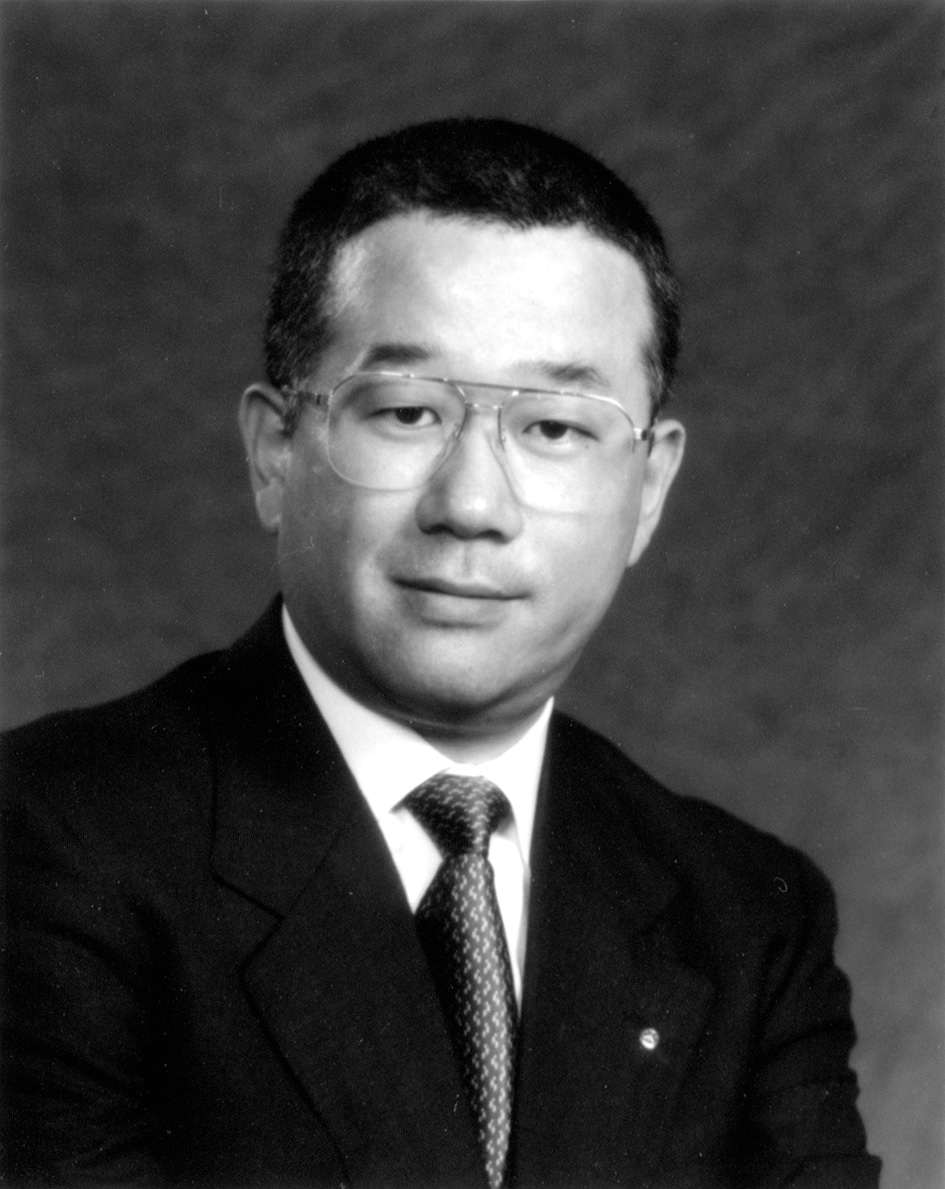
- Born: 1955 (age 70–71); Osaka, Japan
- Awards: Agricultural Trade Expansion Award

Kanji Kitamura (born November 1955) is the founder of Bagel K, a Japanese company that imports and distributes of New York-style bagels to Japan. Kitamura was the first kosher bagel importer in Japan. Bagel K imports 3 million bagels from New York every year.

== Activities ==
Kitamura in 1989 brought Kosher bagels from Brooklyn, New York to Japan and had remarkable success in expanding the bagel business nationwide in Japan as Forbes introduced.

Kitamura tried to bring in Bialy but Japanese have not accepted it until 2013. Food distributors call Kitamura the "Bagel King" because he is the first person to bring Jewish bagels to Japan. In 1980, he lived in the U.S. for five years and lived with a Jewish family which inspired him with the idea to bring authentic bagels to Japan. When he brought the first Bagel to Japan, most food retailers rejected it because Japanese preferred their food soft. Kitamura arduously explained how to eat bagels to each individual consumer and traveled to all the major cities in Japan. The first year, he exported 100,000 bagels and three years later sold 1 million bagels in Japan. Within his first five years, his bagel sales reached 3 million. Japanese discovered the chewy and heavy body texture of the bagel's bread after Kitamura's promotional trips throughout Japan.

Forbes, Kosher Today, and Food Distribution Magazine all selected Kitamura as the Japanese food distributor who creates unique flavored bagels. Kitamura, who has never made products in Japan, always seeks a way to satisfy Japanese consumer demand, even by searching overseas. Kitamura said that the manufacturer knows how to make a good product, while he knows what the Japanese consumer wants. Kitimura's philosophy is that if he were to manufacture something, he would be unable to devote time to tracking consumer demand in 2012

Kitamura coordinated a Thanksgiving party through the Japan-America Society of Osaka and introduces American food to Japan annually at the Osaka Mayor's official residence.

Kitamura also volunteers time for the anti-drug abuse campaign in Japan. He has spent time and effort to prevent drug use among youths and help create a sound upbringing for youth. In fact, a drug and especially MDMA is target to grade school children in 2013.

Kitamura found Japan America Society of Nara in 2016. It is 31st Japan America Society in Japan.

== Other activities ==
- Director of Board Japan-America Society Osaka 801 members
- Anti-Drug Counselor Osaka Prefecture
- Founder of Rowing Club K University
- Chairman of Rowing Club K University
- Adviser of Red Cross Blood Donation Osaka
- Founder of Japan America Society of Nara

== Award ==
- Agricultural Trade Expansion Award by Howard Baker (United States Ambassador to Japan)
- Prevention of drug abuse of distinguished service Award (2007)By governor Osaka Prefecture
- Prevention of drug abuse of distinguished service Award (2008)by Japan Ministry of Health, Labour and WelfareWelcome to Ministry of Health, Labour and Welfare
