= Ryōtei =

Traditional Japanese restaurant

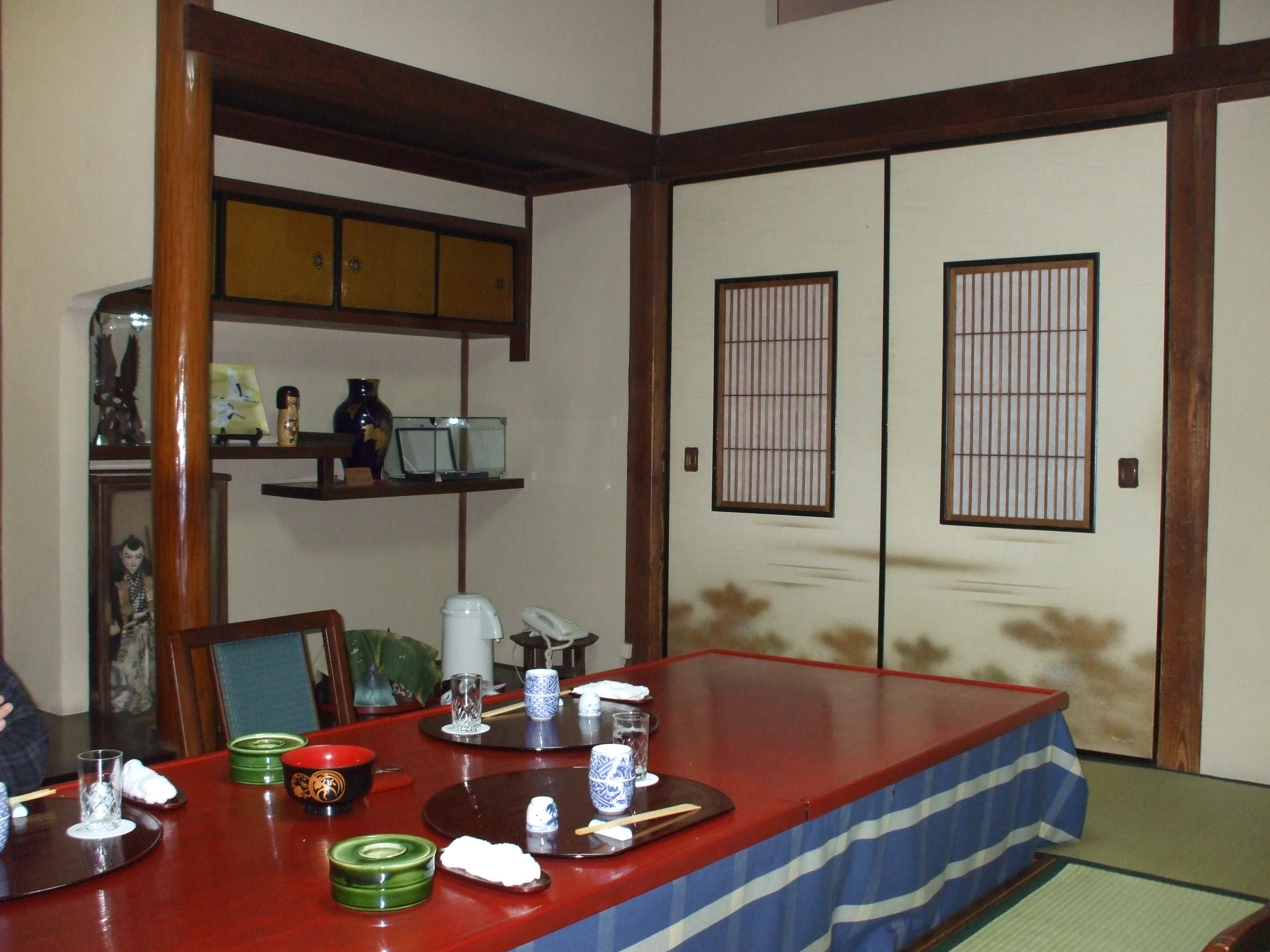
A ryōtei in Japan (Komatsu)

A ryōtei (料亭) is a type of traditional Japanese restaurant. Traditionally, ryōtei only accept new customers by referral and feature entertainment by geisha, but in modern times this is not always the case. Ryōtei are typically places where high-level business or political meetings can take place discreetly.

In Kanazawa, ryōtei compete to sell the most extravagant take-home osechi meals during the new year, a practice that is centuries old.

In the 1840s, the Japanese government used spies to monitor the activity around ryōtei, due to the high profile and wealth associated with their patrons and the spending clampdown during the time of the Tenpō Reforms.

Ryōtei were common to Japanese towns no matter the size until the 1960s, when their use began to decline in favor of hotels and nightclubs as places for entwining business with entertainment. In 1993, then-Prime Minister Morihiro Hosokawa made a declaration to cease the use of ryōtei, effectively rendering them not only unpopular for politicians, but businessmen as well.

The declining use of geisha and ryōtei have led to a relaxation of the exclusivity and secrecy used in their services, such as to advertise on the internet, post prices for services, and accepting new clientele without a reference from a well-established patron.

== List ==
- Kawabun in Nagoya

== See also ==
- Japanese cuisine
- Kaiseki
