= Komatsu (surname) =

Komatsu (written: 小松) is a Japanese surname. Notable people with the surname include:

- Ayaka Komatsu (小松 彩夏, born 1986), model/actress
- Ayao Komatsu (小松 礼雄, born 1976), Formula One engineer and team principal.
- Erik Komatsu (born 1987), American baseball player
- Fuminori Komatsu (小松 史法, born 1978), Japanese voice actor
- Hideki Komatsu (小松 英樹, born 1967), professional Go player
- Hosei Komatsu (小松 方正, 1926–2003), Japanese actor and voice actor
- Ichirō Komatsu (小松 一郎, 1951–2014), Japanese diplomat, civil servant and politician
- Komatsu Akihito (小松宮彰仁親王, 1846–1903), a member of the Japanese imperial family
- Komatsu Kiyokado (小松 清廉, 1835–1870), Japanese samurai of the late Edo period. Later became a government official of the early Meiji period
- Masao Komatsu (小松 政夫, 1942–2020), Japanese actor
- Miho Komatsu (小松 未歩, born 1974), Japanese pop singer
- Mikako Komatsu (小松 未可子, born 1988), Japanese voice actor
- Miyuki Komatsu (小松 みゆき, born 1971), Japanese actress
- Nana Komatsu (小松 菜奈, born 1996), Japanese actress, fashion model
- Ren Komatsu (小松 蓮, born 1998), Japanese footballer
- Rika Komatsu (小松 里歌, born 1975), Japanese voice actress
- Sakyo Komatsu (小松 左京, 1931–2011), Japanese science fiction writer and screenwriter
- Satoshi Komatsu (小松 聖, born 1981), Japanese baseball player
- Takumi Komatsu (小松 拓幹, born 1997), Japanese footballer
- Tatsuo Komatsu (小松 辰雄, born 1959), Japanese baseball player
- Teruhisa Komatsu (小松 輝久, 1888–1970), Imperial Japanese Navy admiral
- Yoma Komatsu (小松 代真, born 1974), Japanese pop singer

== See also ==
- Komatsuhime (1573–1620), Japanese woman of the late Azuchi-Momoyama through early Edo periods
