= Kūsō Kagaku Dokuhon =

Japanese book series

Kūsō Kagaku Dokuhon (空想科学読本) is a popular Japanese book series written by Yanagita Rikao (柳田理科雄) researching the unreasonableness of supermen and robots in anime and manga based science.

== Related works ==
空想歴史読本 Dream history reading - 円道祥之

空想法律読本 Dream law reading - 盛田栄一

空想科学映画読本シリーズ Dream science anime reading series

空想科学漫画読本シリーズ Dream science manga reading series

空想科学日本昔話読本 Dream science Japan history readings

空想科学論争! Dream science controversies - 柳田理科雄・円道祥之 著

空想非科学大全 Dream unscience analogy - 柳田理科雄

空想英語読本 Dream English reading - Matthew Fargo

空想科学大戦!シリーズ（漫画作品）Dream science battle
