= Kobe Line =

Kobe Line (神戸線, Kōbe-sen) may refer to:

- JR Kobe Line, an alias of, and a part of the Tōkaidō Main Line and Sanyō Main Line (Ōsaka-Himeji)
- Hankyu Kobe Line (Umeda-Sannomiya)
- Hanshin Expressway Route 3 (Kobe Route)
