= Makoto Kaneko =

Makoto Kaneko may refer to:

- Makoto Kaneko (businessman) (born 1945), Japanese businessman and horse owner
- Makoto Kaneko (footballer) (born 1975), Japanese former footballer
- Makoto Kaneko (baseball) (born 1975), Japanese baseball player
- Makoto Kaneko, Japanese voice actor, voice of Atsushi Tamai in Arifureta: From Commonplace to World's Strongest
