= Kosher Today =

Trade magazine about magazines

Kosher Today is a periodical focused on "foods that are prepared according to kashrut, the dietary regulations of Judaism."

Described as a trade magazine, it is published by Integrated Marketing Communications. By 2017 it had become online-only; which also has a Breaking News section.

Their coverage is not limited to the U.S. market.

== Kosherfest ==
Kosher Today's publisher is also "the owner of Kosherfest, a kosher food trade show." Competition in this trade show category include Kosher World Conference and Expo and Kosher Food and Life Expo.

== See also ==
- Kosher.com
