= Kusaba Haisen =

Japanese scholar (1787–1867)

Kusaba Haisen (Japanese: 草場 佩川; 1787–1867) was a Japanese Confucian scholar, poet, and painter from Hizen (Saga domain, now part of Saga and Nagasaki prefectures).
