= Usui Kojima =

Japanese author

Usui Kojima (小島 烏水, Kojima Usui; December 29, 1873 – December 13, 1948) was a Japanese author from Yokohama, Japan who authored over 20 books. He was also known for amassing a collection of over 900 ukiyo-e prints and establishing Japan's first mountaineering society.
