= Ōtsukayama Kofun Cluster =

Kofun period burial mound cluster in Japan

Ōtsukayama Kofun
- 大塚山古墳群 (Japanese)
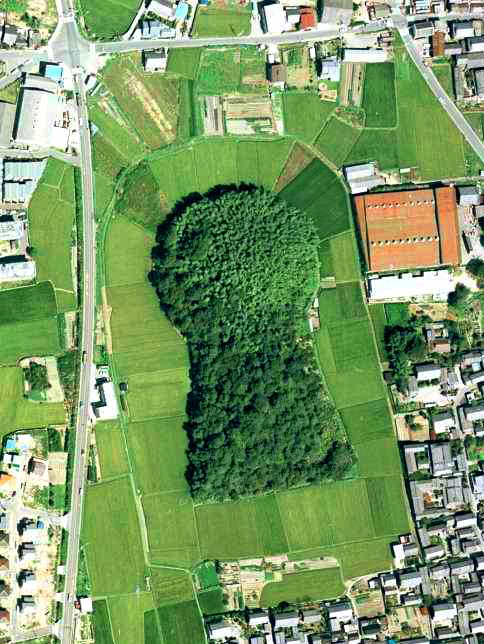
- Ōtsukayama Kofun

- Ōtsukayama Kofun Ōtsukayama Kofun Cluster (Japan)
- Interactive map of Ōtsukayama Kofun
- 34°35′9.4″N 135°44′34.1″E
- Type: Kofun
- Periods: Kofun period
- Location: Kawai, Nara, Japan
- Region: Kansai region

History
- Built: c.5th-6th century

Site notes
- Public access: Yes (no facilities)

Ōtsukayama Kofun cluster (大塚山古墳群) is a group of eight Kofun period burial mounds, located in the Kawai neighborhood of the city of Kawai, Nara in the Kansai region of Japan. The tumulus cluster was designated a National Historic Site of Japan in 1956. It is part of the northern group of the Umami Kofun cluster.

== Overview ==
The Ōtsukayama Kofun cluster is located in the northeast of Kawai Town, at the confluence of various rivers in the Nara Basin. It consists of three zenpō-kōen-fun (前方後円墳), which are shaped like a keyhole, having one square end and one circular end, when viewed from above (Ōtsukayama, Shiroyama, and Takayamazuka No. 1), four enpun (円墳)-style circular tombs (Maruyama, Takayamazuka No. 2, Takayamazuka No. 3, and Takayamazuka No. 4), and one hōfun (方墳)-style square tomb (Kusozuka Kofun), and is believed to have been built between the late 5th century and the early 6th century. The Ōtsukayama Kofun, the largest of the group, is 197 meters long, making it one of the largest kofun of the same period in the Nara Basin. It is surrounded by a moat, and in some places, a bank and an outer moat (outside the designated historic site) remain. The Shiroyama Kofun, located northeast of Ōtsukayama Kofun, is believed to have been the last built in the group, dates from the early 6th century. This tumulus is also one of the largest in the Nara Basin for its time, measuring approximately 108 meters in total length.

=== Ōtsukayama Kofun ===
The Ōtsukayama Kofun has a posterior circular portion with a diameter of 108 meters and height of 15.8 meters, and a rectangular anterior portion with a width of 123 meters and height of 16.9 meters. It is orientated to the south and was constructed in three tiers. The mound is well preserved, and although the moat is now a rice field, traces of the shield-shaped moat remain clearly visible. The mound has fukiishi roofing stones and cylindrical, morning-glory shaped and figurative haniwa., and Sue ware imitations of Haji ware pottery. Since it contains Sue pottery, it is estimated to have been built in the mid-to-late 5th century. There is also a monument to Emperor Meiji at the top of the front part, which was built by local residents, after he used the tumulus as an observation post for military maneuvers in the area. Until 1963, there was an elementary school to the east of Ōtsukayama Kofun, and the kofun was used as part of the playground.

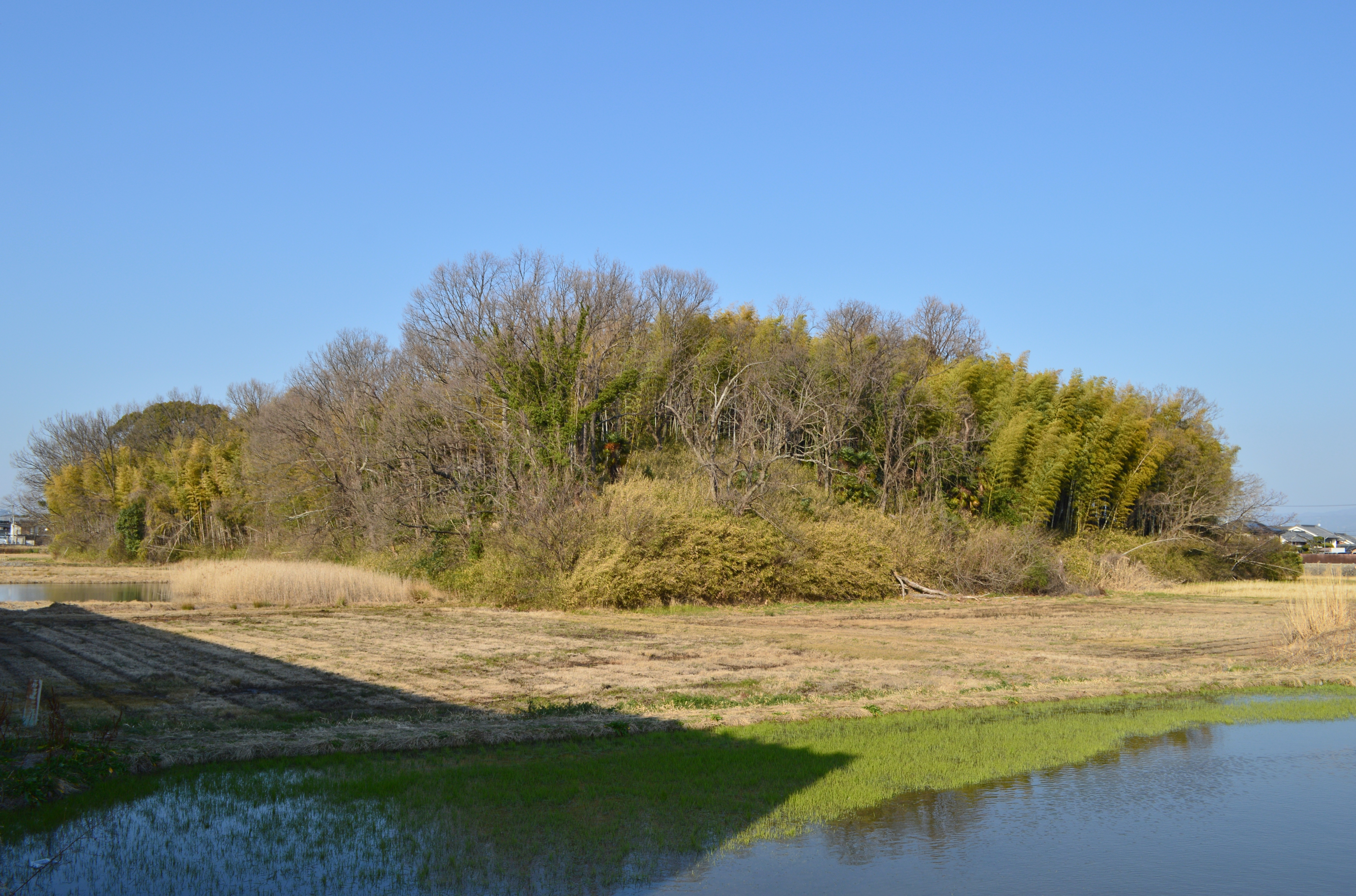
Ōtsukayama Kofun

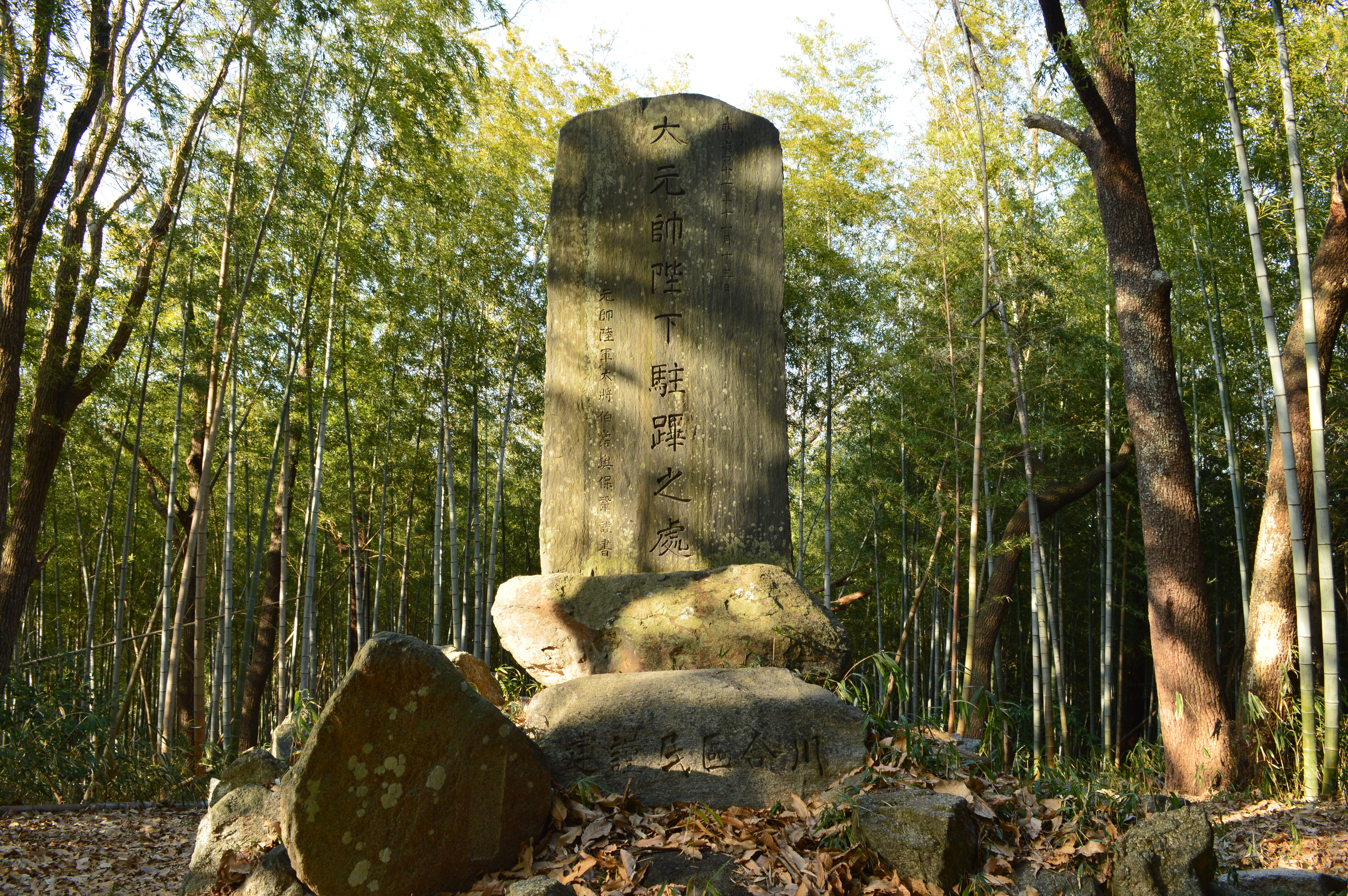
Monument to Emperor Meiji

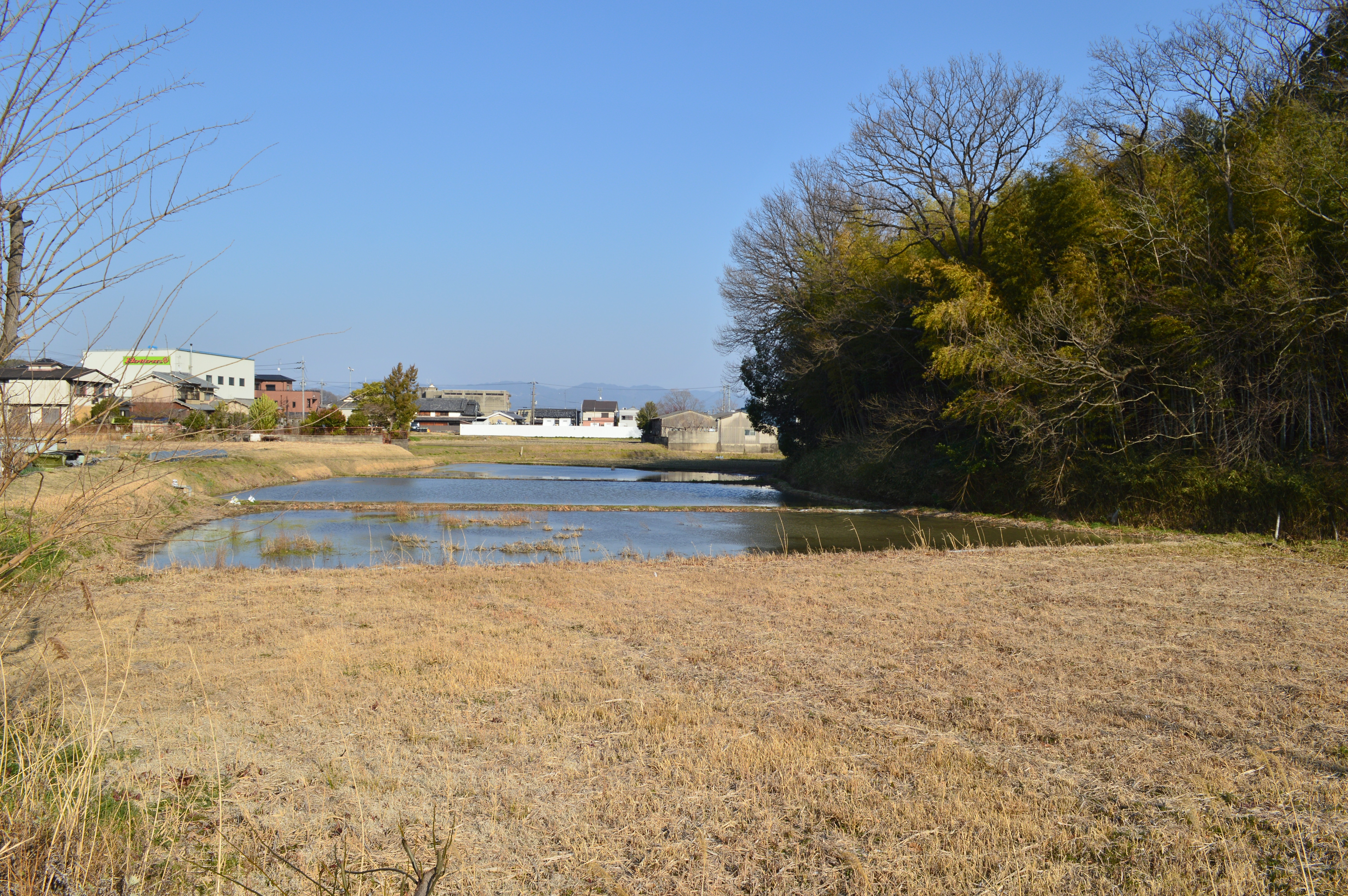
Fragment of moats

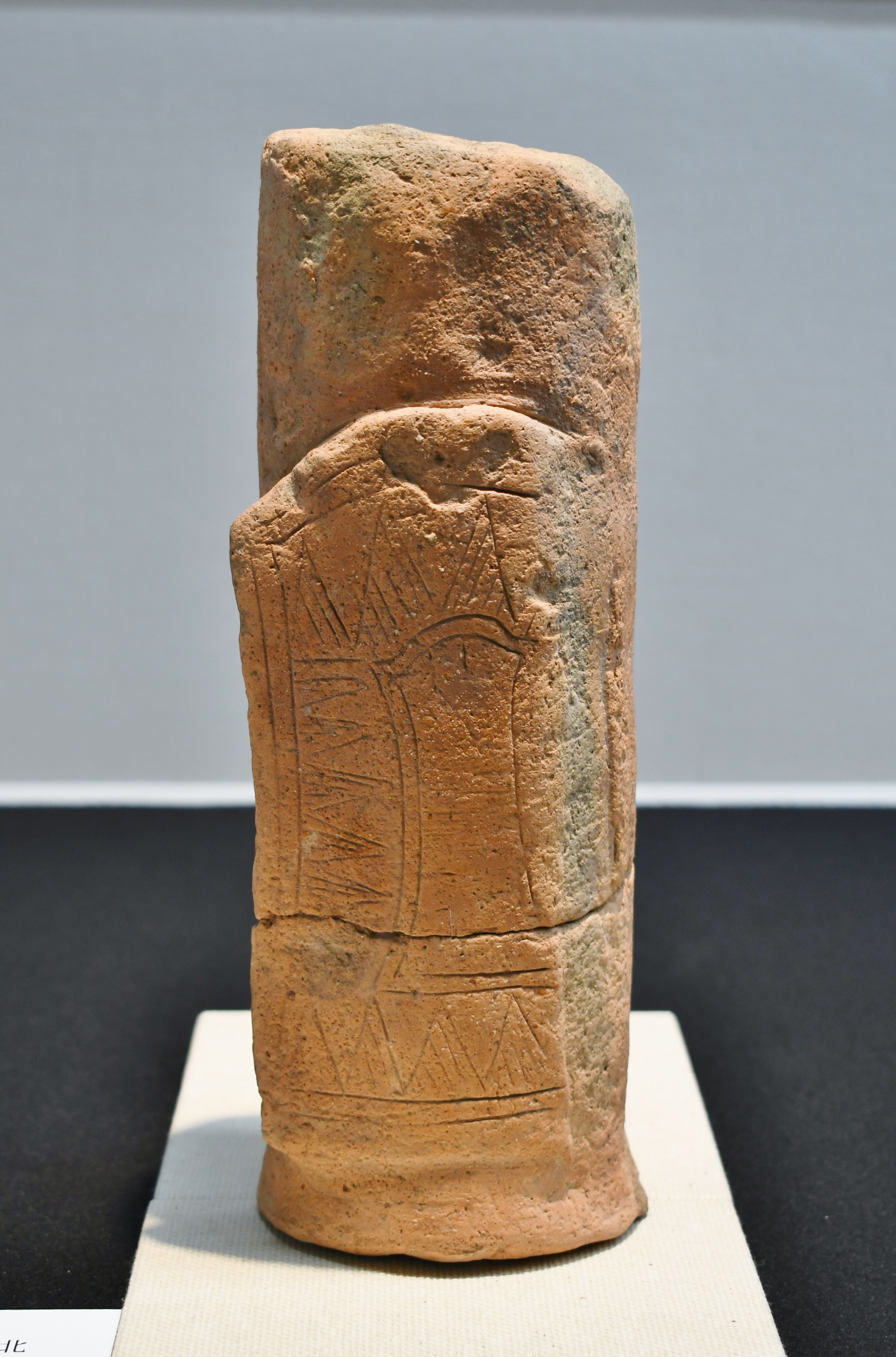
House-shaped haniwa

The Ōtsukayama Kofun is about 1.6 kilometers each of Samitagawa Station on the Kintetsu Railway Tawaramoto Line

== See also ==
- List of Historic Sites of Japan (Nara)
