= Komatsu (Japanese restaurant) =

Komatsu (小松)
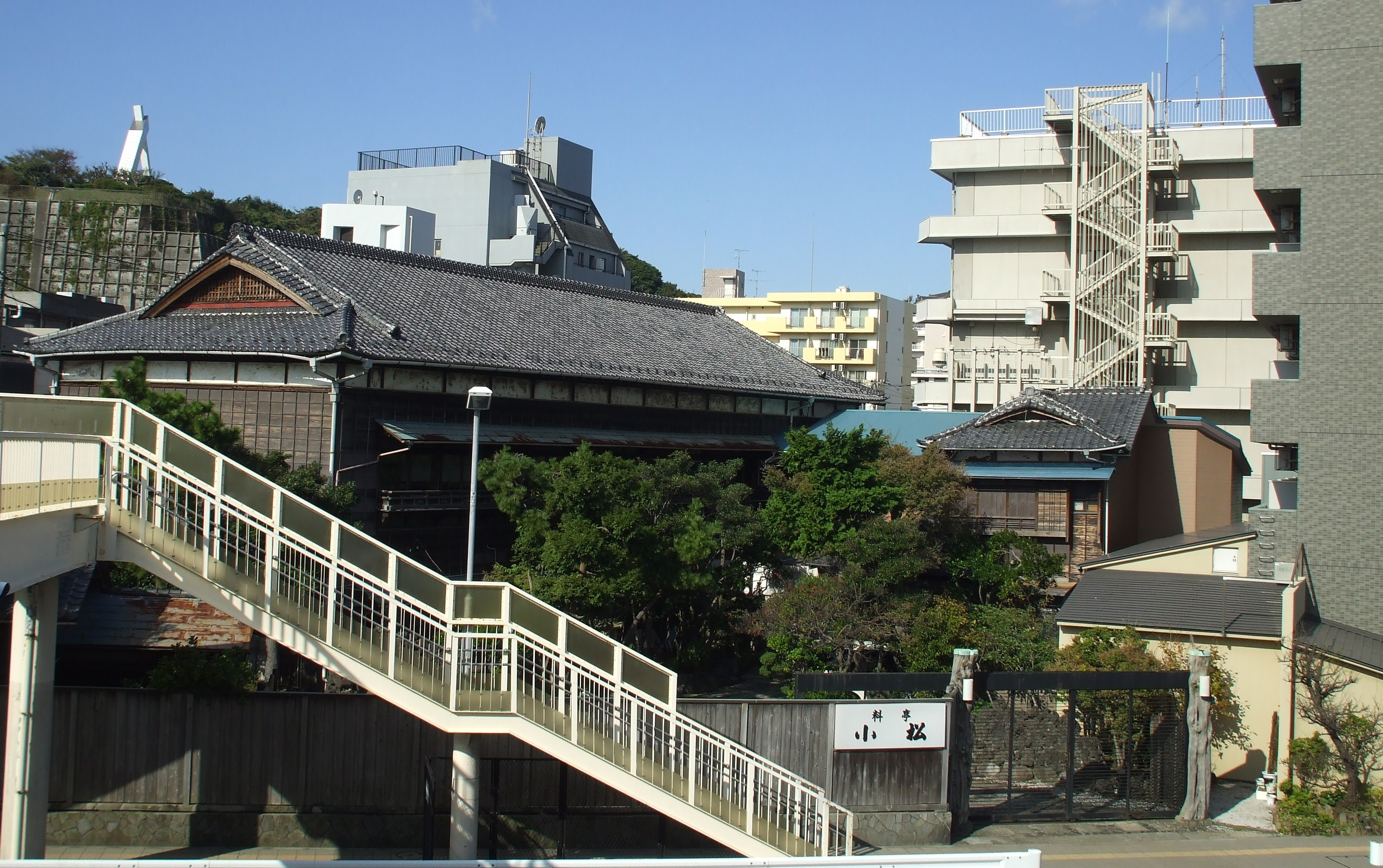
- Komatsu

- Komatsu in Kanagawa.

Restaurant information
- Established: August 8, 1885
- Food type: Ryōtei
- Location: Yokosuka, Kanagawa, Japan
- Coordinates: 35°16′33.3″N 139°40′36″E
- Note: On May 16, 2016, Komatsu restaurant caught fire.
- Website: www5f.biglobe.ne.jp/~ryoutei-komatsu/

Komatsu (小松) was a Japanese restaurant in Yokosuka, Kanagawa, Japan. Known as the "Navy Restaurant Komatsu", it was a preferred eating location for Japanese naval officers prior to, and following, World War II; American Navy personnel and those related to the Japanese navy also patronized the establishment in significant numbers.

On May 16, 2016, Komatsu restaurant was completely destroyed by fire.

== History ==
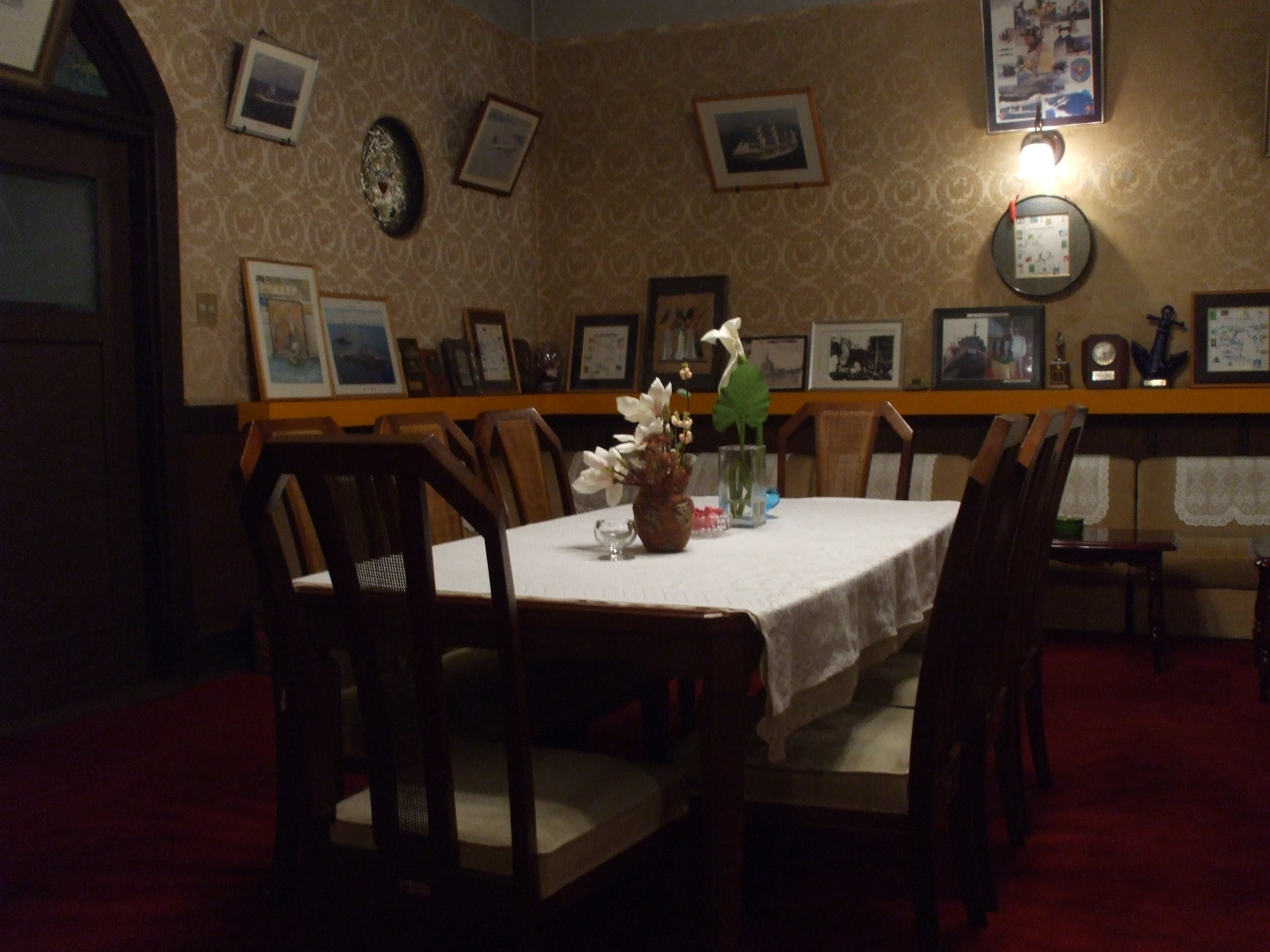
A waiting room in Komatsu.

Komatsu was started by Komatsu Yamamoto on 8 August 1885, which was the eighth month and eighth day of the year of Meiji 18, a date that accorded with the Japanese preference for the lucky numbers "8, 8, 8". The building site is in a convenient location where people during the late-nineteenth and early-twentieth centuries could easily eat a Japanese dinner after swimming in the sea. During that era, Japan was expanding its Navy. Under the direction of the Navy Minister, the Naval headquarters, Chinjufu, was occupied with planning and practice for its fleet, recruiting of sailors, overall management, and supervision of the Navy.

In line with the expanding Imperial Navy, Komatsu continued to develop, and it was called "Pine" (Matsu is "pine" in English). Gradually, the restaurant lost its locational advantage due to a land reclamation process in 1913, and it was no longer a place of white sand and green pine trees. Additionally, due to World War I and strikes for the improvement of female work conditions, Komatsu was forced to close between 1918 and 1919.

In 1923, the Restaurant Komatsu was built again in a location that overlooked the sea in Yonegahama, and, at the request of Shigeyoshi Inoue, a South Pacific location of Pine was opened on one of the Chuuk islands between 1942 and 1944. Following the defeat of Japan, the restaurant became an office for the settlement of remaining affairs of the Navy and a hotel for interpreters, and in October 1945, it was designated as a restaurant for American military personnel.

Since Japan's independence in 1952, Restaurant Komatsu has been widely used, not only by American Navy personnel, but also by Japanese men related to the Navy in some manner. It is the only Japanese restaurant that was operational during both World Wars. As of 2009, the restaurant was housed in a typical Japanese building from the Shōwa period, and had retained various historical documents, such as the calligraphies of Tōgō Heihachirō, Isoroku Yamamoto, and Mitsumasa Yonai, famous Japanese Naval admirals.

== Komatsu Yamamoto and the origin of Komatsu ==
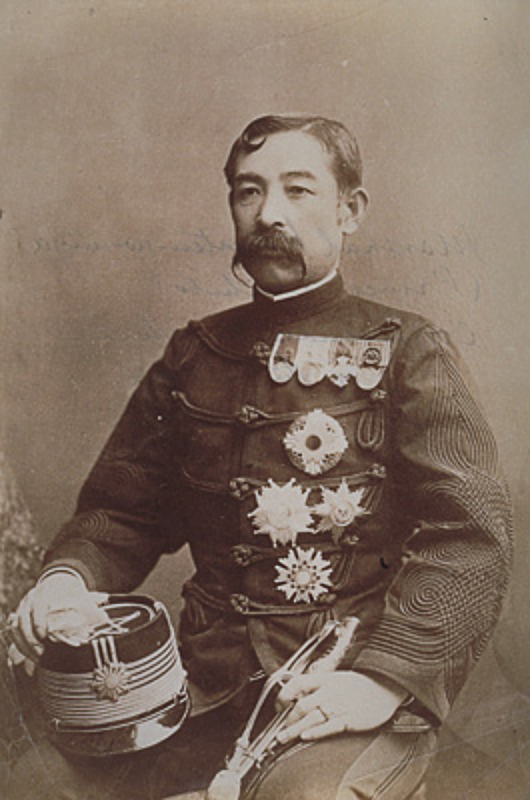
Prince Komatsu Akihito, who gave his name to the mistress of the Japanese restaurant

The mistress of the restaurant was Komatsu Yamamoto, whose former name was Etsu Yamamoto. She was born in 1849 at Koishigawa Sekiguchi Suidōcho as the fourth daughter of a grocer in Edo. Yamamoto began working at a small inn–restaurant called Yoshikawaya in Uraga, a small harbor town that was also a Navy town. Whilst working in Uraga, she became friends with admirals and naval officers.

In 1875, Prince Komatsu Akihito, Prince Kitashirakawa Yoshihisa, Prince Fushimi Sadanaru and Prince Yamashina Akira visited Uraga for the inspection of the shooting of torpedoes. They were followed by General Akiyoshi Yamada, Yamagata Aritomo and Saigo Tsugumichi. The princes hoped that the naval officers would stay at Yoshikawaya due to the view that it offered, but the officers had been allocated other accommodation beforehand.

During the first night in Uraga, the princes competed in a thumb wrestling match with the mistress, the latter winning overwhelmingly. Prince Komatsu divulged to Yamamoto that he envied her body and strength, in addition to an assertion that he would endow her with a name. On the following day, the princes ordered a formal change of Etsu's name to Komatsu; this is the origin of the name, Yamamoto Komatsu (in kana). Yamamoto made a decision to be an independent woman following the advice of people connected to the Navy and her restaurant was opened on 8 August 1885, along the Tado seashore, later relocating near the Shotokuji-Sakashita bus stop.

== Taisho Era ==
In 1913, the seashore of Tado was changed into land (land reclamation) and there was no privileged scenery. The crisis after World War I decreased the number of customers, and Restaurant Komatsu had to be closed in 1918 and 1919. Komatsu Yamamoto concentrated her work as the mistress of Yamatoya, a geisha house in Yokosuka. Since many navy officers deplored the closure of Komatsu, she bought 400 tsubos of land in Yonegahama and started the reconstruction of Komatsu in 1923. Fortunately, the effects of the 1923 Great Kantō earthquake were slight and it was completed in November. The total area of the reconstructed Komatsu was 175 tsubos; there were seven rooms on the first floor and three rooms on the second floor.

== Naoe Yamamoto, the second mistress ==
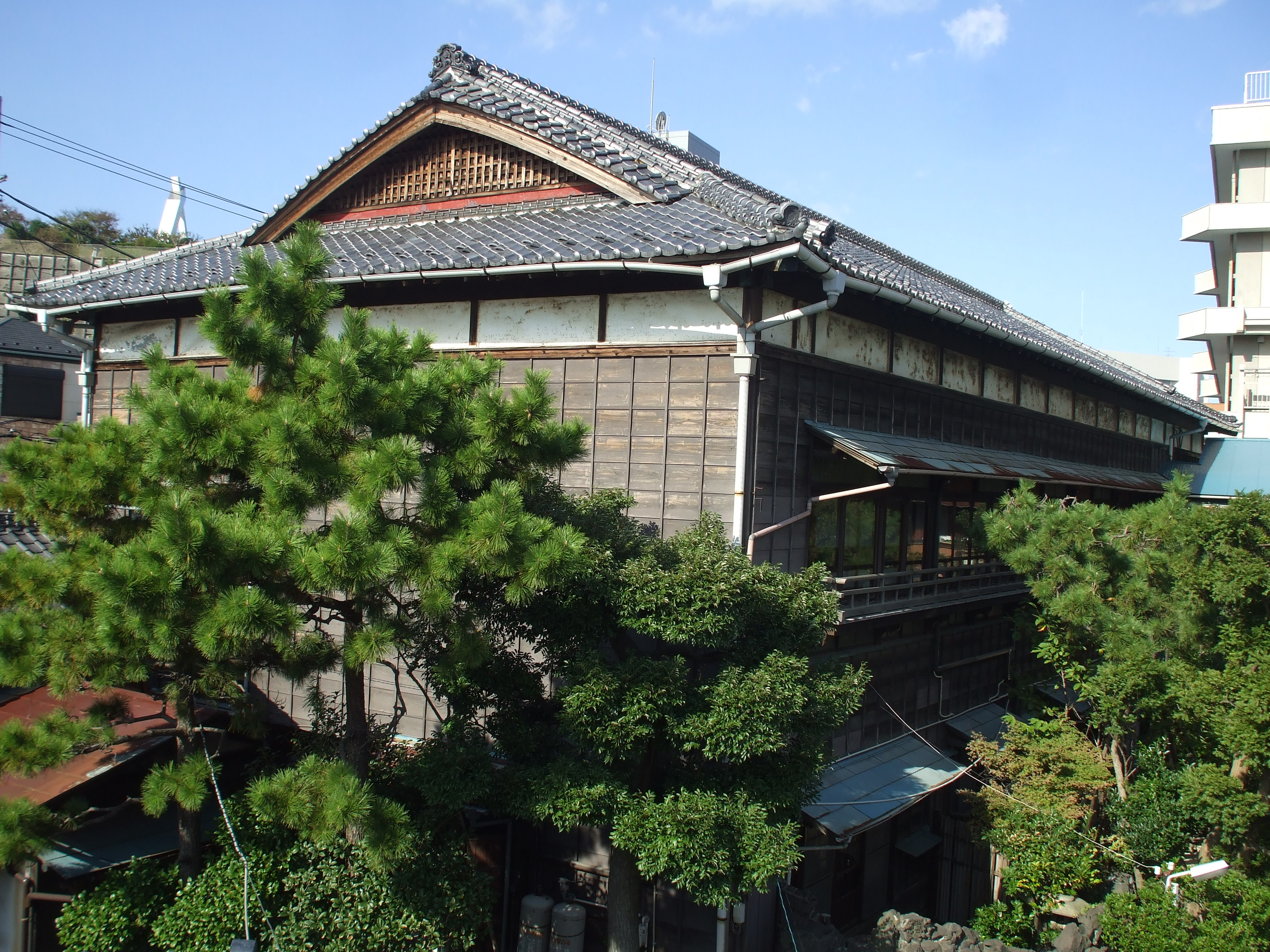
New building since 1934.

In 1924, Komatsu Yamamoto, who had remained single during her life, adopted her grandniece Naoe Goto, who was 15 years old, and changed her name to Naoe Yamamoto. In 1927, at age 18, she was wed to Koji Kirigatani, a son of a timber trader, and assumed management of the restaurant; she became its second mistress and supported it well into the Heisei age.

== Admiral's Room ==
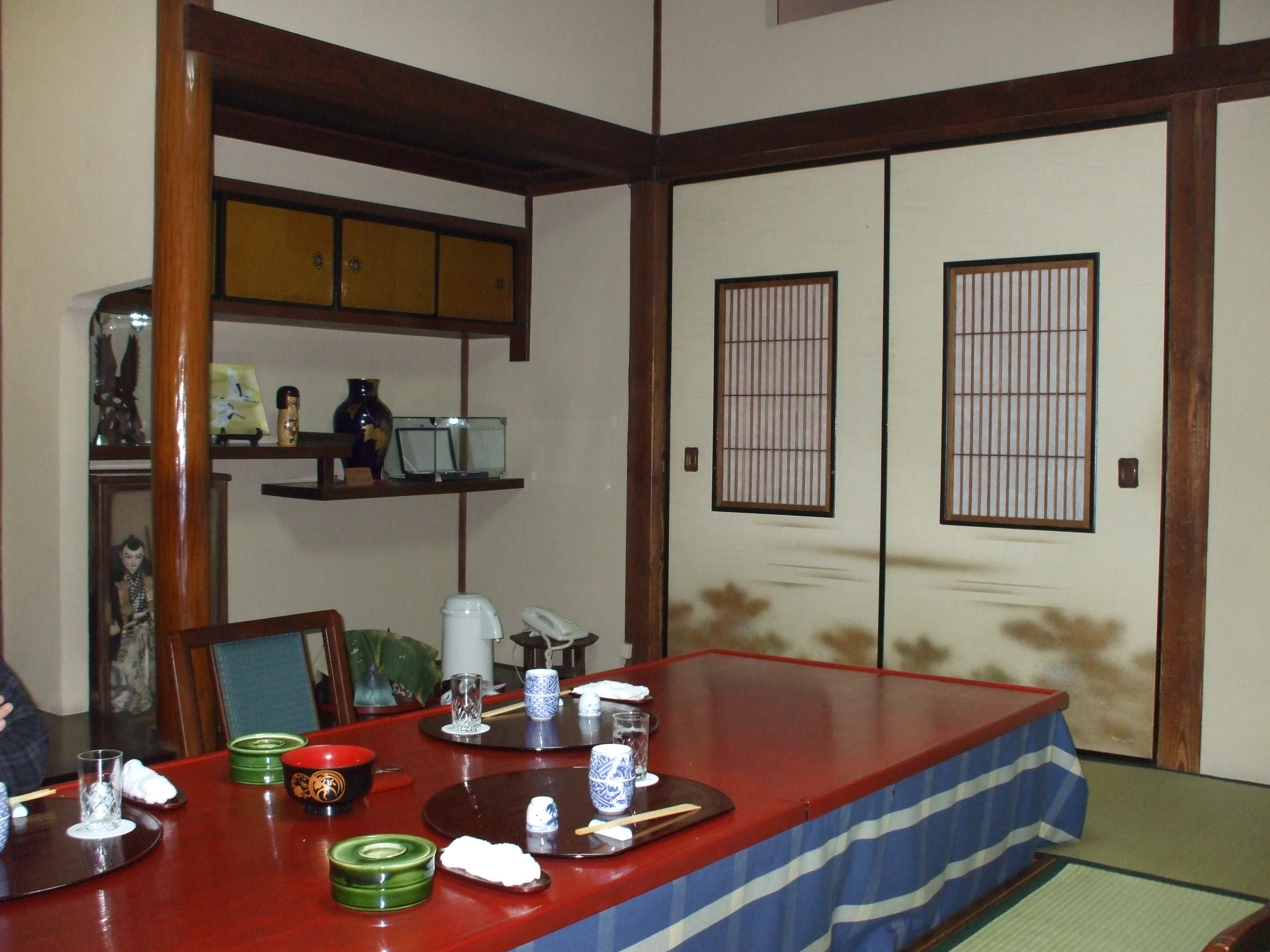
Admiral's Room

From 1933 to 1934, a new wing of the house was constructed on the previous site of the garden: a Western reception room and seven Japanese-style rooms. One of the users of the reception room was Isoroku Yamamoto. As of 2012, this room was a museum with historic materials related to the Japanese navy. Seven Japanese-style rooms were composed of various woods such as Paulownia tomentosa, rosewood, Chamaecyparis obtusa, maple and pseudocydonia. The Momiji (Japanese maple or Autumn leaf color in general) Room was top-grade and used by various admirals such as Isoroku Yamamoto. The room came to be known as the chokan-beya (the Admiral's room). In the second floor of the new wing was a large room as large as 160 mats. Komatsu Yamamoto, the first mistress, used to appear in Japanese-style parties until she was 88 in 1935. She was given a gala 88th year birthday party. Then, she retired and died at age 94 in 1943.

== Bibliography ==
- Asada Tsuyoshi, Story of Navy Restaurant Komatsu 1996, Kanashin Shuppan, ISBN 4-87645-171-0
- Mogami Akinori, A Life Story of Komatsu Yamamoto 1960
- Toyama Saburo, Ikari to Pain (Anchor (Navy) and Restaurant Komatsu) 1983, Seizansha
- Yokosuka City, New History of Yokosuka City, Suffix; Cultural Heritage 2009, Yokosuka City
