= Kawanishi, Nara =

Kawanishi 川西町
- Town
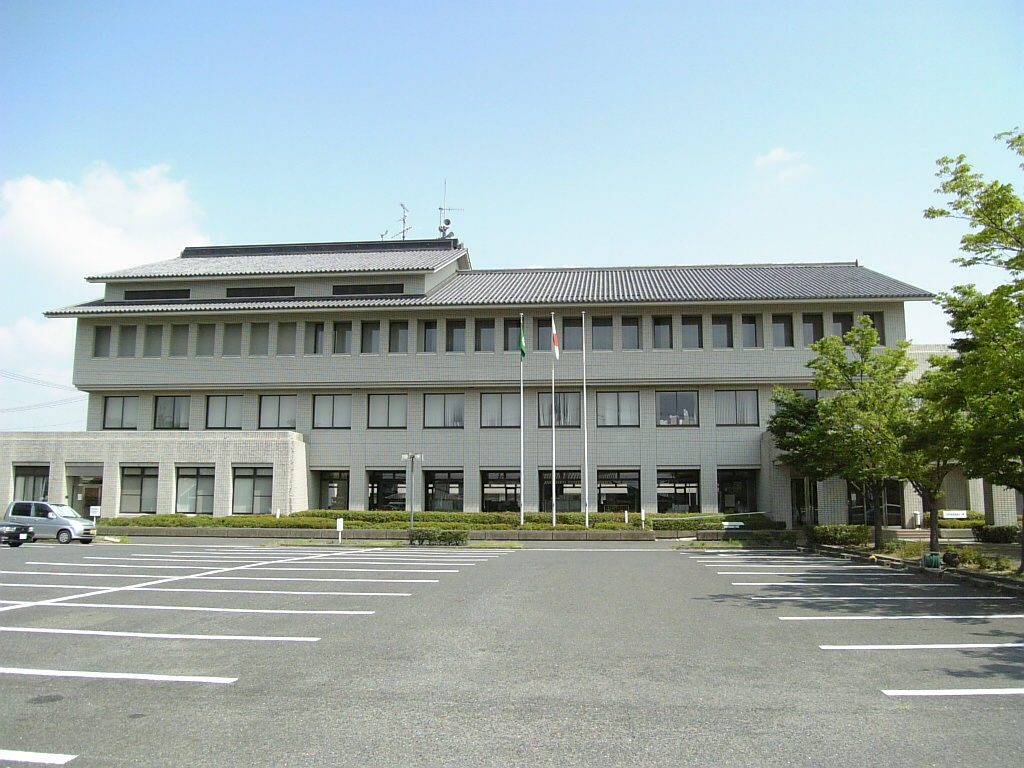
- Kawanishi Town Hall

- Flag Emblem
- Interactive map of Kawanishi
- Location in Japan
- Coordinates: 34°35′04″N 135°46′27″E
- Country: Japan
- Region: Kansai
- Prefecture: Nara
- District: Shiki

Area
  - Total: 5.93 km^{2} (2.29 sq mi)

Population (December 1, 2024)
  - Total: 7,985
  - Density: 1,350/km^{2} (3,490/sq mi)
- Time zone: UTC+09:00 (JST)
- City hall address: 28-1 Yūzaki Ōaza, Kawanishi-chō, Nara-ken 636-0213
- Website: Official website
- Symbols
- Flower: Cosmos (plant)
- Tree: Zelkova serrata

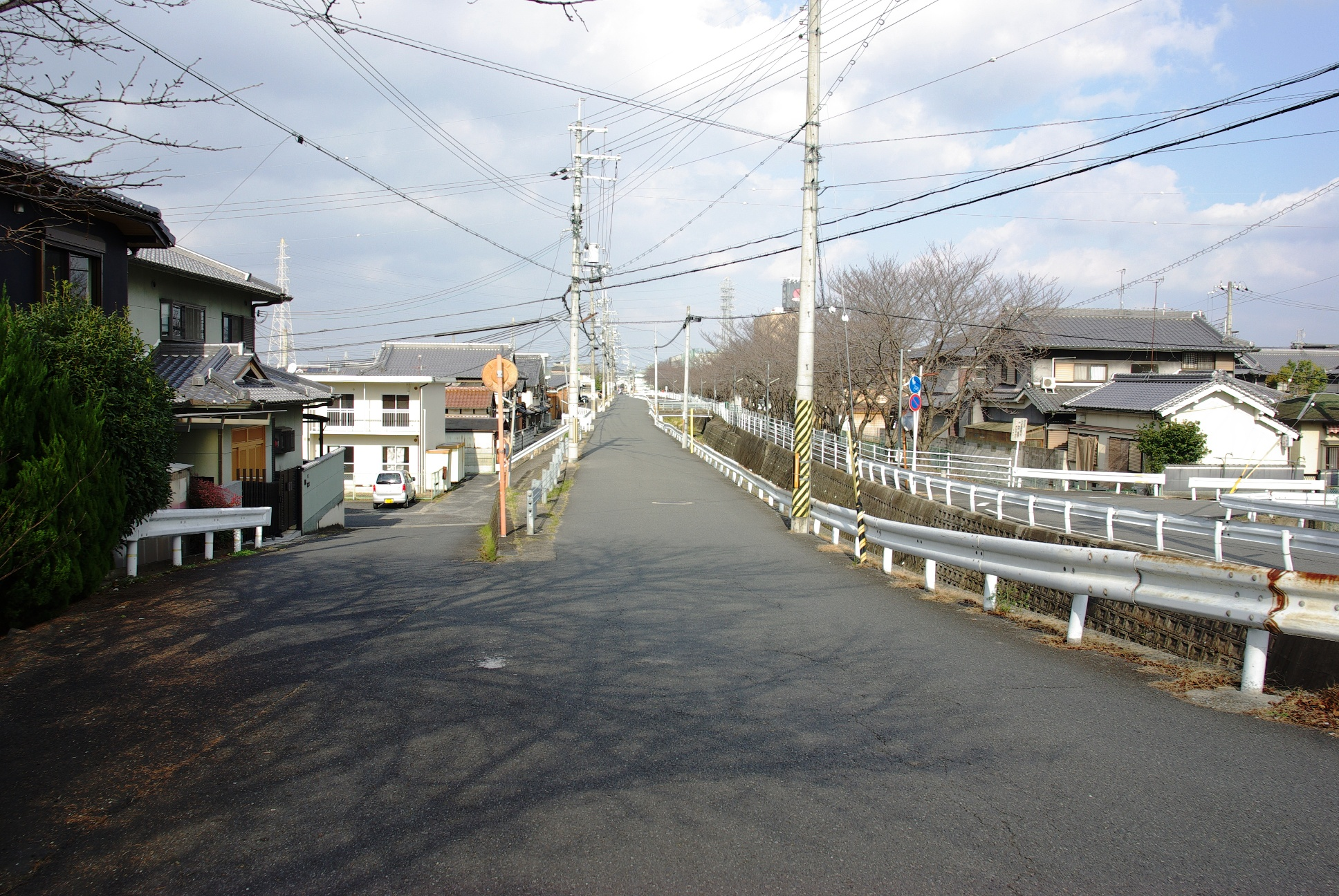
160104-11 The north side of Yamato River

Kawanishi (川西町, Kawanishi-chō) is a town located in Shiki District, Nara Prefecture, Japan. As of 1 December 2024, the town had an estimated population of 7,985 in 3594 households, and a population density of 1300 persons per km^{2}. The total area of the city is 5.93 km^{2} (2.29 sq mi).

== Geography ==
Kawanishi is located in the flatlands of northeast Nara Prefecture in the Nara Basin. The Yamato River flows through the town, and branches off into three rivers, the Asuka River, the Tera River, and the Soga River.

=== Surrounding municipalities ===
Nara Prefecture

- Yamatokōriyama
- Tenri
- Ando
- Miyake
- Kawai

=== Climate ===
Kawanishi has a humid subtropical climate (Köppen Cfa) characterized by warm summers and cool winters with light to no snowfall. The average annual temperature in Kawanishi is 14.1 °C. The average annual rainfall is 1636 mm with September as the wettest month. The temperatures are highest on average in August, at around 26.1 °C, and lowest in January, at around 2.6 °C.

=== Demographics ===
Per Japanese census data, the population of Kawanishi is as shown below

Historical population
Year	Pop.	±%
1940	5,399	—
1950	6,636	+22.9%
1960	6,337	−4.5%
1970	6,269	−1.1%
1980	9,446	+50.7%
1990	9,650	+2.2%
2000	9,422	−2.4%
2010	8,653	−8.2%
2020	8,167	−5.6%

== History ==
The area of Kawanishi was part of ancient Yamato Province, and many kofun burial mounds are located within the town. The village of Kawanishi was established on April 1, 1889, with the creation of the modern municipalities system. It was elevated to town status on April 1, 1975.

== Government ==
Kawanishi has a mayor-council form of government with a directly elected mayor and a unicameral town council of 12 members. Kawanishi, collectively with the other municipalities of Shiki District, contributes two members to the Nara Prefectural Assembly. In terms of national politics, the town is part of the Nara 2nd district of the lower house of the Diet of Japan.

== Economy ==
The local economy is based on agriculture and light manufacturing. The local speciality is green onions, and in terms of manufacturing, the area is traditionally a center for button production.

== Education ==
Kawanishi has one public combined elementary/junior high school operated by the town government. The town does not have a high school.

== Transportation ==
=== Railways ===
Kintetsu Railway - Kashihara Line

Yūzaki

=== Highways ===
Kawanishi is not on any expressway or national highway.

== Local attractions ==
- Shimanoyama Kofun, National Historic Site
