= Hajime Kaneko =

Japanese jurist

Hajime Kaneko (兼子 一, Kaneko Hajime, 1906–1973) was a Japanese jurist noted for his contributions to the law of civil procedure.

Kaneko was appointed professor at the University of Tokyo in 1931, and left the chair in 1950 to practice law. His writings contributed to the dogmatic structure of civil procedure, and his textbook System of Civil Procedure Law (民事訴訟法体系, Minji soshōhō taikei) (1954) was very influential in teaching and legal practice.
