= Kitaura, Miyazaki =

Dissolved municipality in Miyazaki prefecture, Japan

Kitaura (北浦町, Kitaura-chō) was a town located in Higashiusuki District, Miyazaki Prefecture, Japan.

As of 2003, the town had an estimated population of 4,477 and the density of 43.24 persons per km^{2}. The total area was 103.53 km^{2}.

On February 20, 2006, Kitaura, along with the town of Kitakata (also from Higashiusuki District), was merged into the expanded city of Nobeoka.
