= Kumabito =

People of ancient Japan

The Kumabito (肥人 'Hi people') were a people of ancient Japan, believed to have lived in the west of Kyūshū in the Hi Province (肥国).

== See also ==
- Kumaso
