= Kawaramachi Station =

Kawaramachi Station may refer to any of the following railway stations in Japan.

- Kawaramachi Station (Kagawa) - (瓦町駅) in Takamatsu, Kagawa Prefecture
- Kyoto-kawaramachi Station - (京都河原町駅) in Kyoto, which was renamed in October 2019 from Kawaramachi Station.
- Kawaramachi Station (Mie) - (川原町駅) in Yokkaichi, Mie Prefecture
- Kawaramachi Station (Miyagi) - (河原町駅) in Sendai, Miyagi Prefecture
