= Takumi Komatsu =

Japanese footballer

Personal information
- Date of birth: 9 April 1997 (age 29)
- Place of birth: Osaka, Japan
- Height: 1.87 m (6 ft 2 in)
- Position: Defender

Team information
- Current team: Kamatamare Sanuki
- Number: 5

Youth career
- 2013–2015: Hannan University High School

College career
Years	Team	Apps	(Gls)
2016–2019	Ritsumeikan University		

Senior career*
Years	Team	Apps	(Gls)
2020–	Kamatamare Sanuki	61	(2)
- * Club domestic league appearances and goals as of 1 January 2026

Takumi Komatsu (小松 拓幹, Komatsu Takumi; born 9 April 1997) is a Japanese footballer currently playing as a defender for Kamatamare Sanuki.

== Career statistics ==
=== Club ===
As of 10 November 2020.

Club	Season	League			National Cup		League Cup		Other		Total	
Club	Season	Division	Apps	Goals	Apps	Goals	Apps	Goals	Apps	Goals	Apps	Goals
Kamatamare Sanuki	2020	J3 League	5	0	0	0	–		0	0	5	0
Career total			5	0	0	0	0	0	0	0	5	0
