= Yoshihiko Kazamaru =

Yoshihiko Kazamaru (風丸 良彦, Kazamaru Yoshihiko, born 1958) is a Japanese contemporary literary critic.

== Bibliography ==
- Who Knew That Raymond Carver Died? (カーヴァーが死んだことなんてだあれも知らなかった, Kāvā ga Shinda Koto Nante Daare mo Shiranakatta) (1992)
- "I" Crossing the Border (越境する「僕」, Ekkyo Suru "Boku") (2006)
- Rereading the Short Stories of Haruki Murakami (村上春樹短篇再読, Murakami Haruki Tanpen Saidoku) (2007)
