= Kiwa, Mie =

Former town in Mie Prefecture, Japan

Kiwa (紀和町, Kiwa-chō) was a town located in Minamimuro District, Mie Prefecture, Japan.

As of 2003, the town had an estimated population of 1,674 and a density of 14.73 persons per km^{2}. The total area was 113.67 km^{2}.

On November 1, 2005, Kiwa was merged into the expanded city of Kumano and thus no longer exists as an independent municipality.
