= Dan Kogai =

Japanese open-source developer and alpha blogger

Dan Kogai (小飼弾, Kogai Dan; born 1969) is a Japanese open-source developer and alpha blogger, known for his blog 404 Blog Not Found (ranked #5 in Japan). He is also the former CTO of Livedoor.

== Background ==
Kogai went to middle school, but he had problems with formal education and skipped classes. Immediately after he graduated from middle school at the age of 16 he passed the high-school equivalence exam, and up until age 18 he spent his time teaching senior students as a tutor and cram school teacher. He then entered the University of California, Berkeley.

During his fourth year at university, his family's home burnt down, and he left school. He made a living with the computer skills he had learnt at university, and at age 29 was headhunted by Takafumi Horie to join Livin' On the Edge (now Livedoor).

== Works ==
=== Self-authored ===
- Kogai, Dan (2003). tatsujin ni manabu Perl/CGI dōjō. Impress Communications. ISBN 4844317423.
- Kogai, Dan (2008). kogai dan no arufagiiku ni atte kita. Gijutsu-Hyohron. ISBN 978-4774134529.

=== Co-authored ===
- Kogai, Dan (2006). marugoto Perl! Vol.1 -- Web 2.0 wo purogramingu shiyō. Impress Communications. ISBN 4-8443-2289-3.
- Kogai, Dan (2006). Web 2.0 tsūru no tukaikata -- mada, Google dake desu ka?. Gijutsu-Hyohron. ISBN 4-7741-2908-9.
- Kogai, Dan (2007). marugoto JavaScript&Ajax! Vol. 1. Impress Communications. ISBN 978-4-8443-2364-8.
- Kogai, Dan (2007). 2channeru wa naze tsuburenai no ka?. Fushosha. ISBN 978-4-5940-5388-8.
- Kogai, Dan (2008). dangen - seikō suru jinsei to baransu shiito no tsukaikata. Aspect. ISBN 978-4-7572-1533-7.
