= Kosuge Tadamoto =

Kosuge Tadamoto (小菅 忠元; died 1582) was a retainer of the Japanese clan of Takeda during the Sengoku period (16th century) of Japan. Tadamoto had at one time been a daimyō within the province of Shinano. Tadamoto had served under the famed Yamagata Masakage, in which it is thought that Tadamoto had been a relative of some sort towards Masakage. Tadamoto would later fight in various campaigns such as Nagashino in 1575. Tadamoto would afterwards be renowned as an infantry commander. During the destruction of the Takeda in 1582 (due to Oda/Tokugawa alliance), Tadamoto had led a relief force to the Takato Castle. Throughout Tadamoto's attempt however, he ended up being cut down by an enemy vassal, thus ending his life.
