= Kitakata, Miyazaki =

Dissolved municipality in Miyazaki prefecture, Japan

Kitakata (北方町, Kitakata-chō) was a town located in Higashiusuki District, Miyazaki Prefecture, Japan.

In 2003, the town had an estimated population of 4,838 and a density of 24.11 per square kilometre (62.4/sq mi). The total area was 200.70 square kilometres (77.49 sq mi).

On February 20, 2006, Kitakata, along with the town of Kitaura (also from Higashiusuki District), was merged into the expanded city of Nobeoka.
