= Kaneko Ietada =

12th-century Japanese samurai

Kaneko Ietada (金子 家忠; 1138 – March 6, 1216) was a famed samurai following the Heian period of the 12th century of Japan.

== Career ==
Ietada served under Minamoto no Yoshitomo during the Hōgen Rebellion of 1156. Throughout this rebellion, he fought the Takama brothers (Takama Saburo, and Takama Shiro). Even though the Takama brothers were widely known for their strength in combat, Ietada got on top of Shiro, holding on to him, about to take his head. Saburo dropped on top of Ietada, trying to keep his brother from being killed, pulled at the helmet of Ietada, intending on taking his head. Ietada followed in holding down the left and right arms of the enemy currently beneath him with his knees, yanked up the left armor skirt of Saburo (who was on top), and turning upon him, stabbed him more than three times.

Ietada beheaded Shiro and raising it stuck on his sword point shouted, "In the presence of Minamoto Tametomo of Tsukushi, famed these days as a superhuman, Ietada has killed Takama Shiro and his brother". Following this, Ietada remounted his horse, proclaiming, "I, Kaneko no Juro Ietada, a resident of Musashi province, have come forth before the renowned Minamoto Tametomo of Tsukushi, and with my own hands have taken both the heads of the two mounted warriors. Observe this, both enemy and allies! A feat rarely achieved either in ancient times or the present!...I am the Ietada who wishes to bequeth his name to generations to come. If there are warriors among Tametomo's band who feel they are my match, let them come and grapple with me."

Ietada was singled out as an example of the honor of samurai and prowess by the author of Hogen Monogatari: "With his martial prowess, he has established his fame in this life. His loyalty will live throughout the ages, his name imprinted on future generations and his achievements bequeathed to his descendants."
