= Kuni =

Kuni or KUNI may refer to:

== People ==
- Kuni-no-miya (久邇) ōke (princely house), the second oldest branch of the Japanese Imperial Family created from branches of the Fushimi-no-miya house
- Kuni Nagako (1903–2000), member of the Imperial House of Japan
- Prince Kuni Asaakira (久邇宮 朝融王, 1901–1959) member of the Japanese imperial family
- Prince Kuni Asahiko (久邇宮 朝彦親王, 1824–1891) member of the Japanese imperial family
- Prince Kuni Kuniyoshi (久邇宮邦彦王, 1873–1929) member of the Japanese imperial family
- Prince Kuni Taka (久邇宮多嘉王, 1875–1937) member of the Japanese imperial family
- Kuni Takahashi, (高橋 邦典, born 1966) Japanese photojournalist
- Ide Kuni (井出 国子; 1863–1947), Japanese religious leader
- Kuni Kaa Jenkins, (born 1941) New Zealand educationalist and author
- Kuni, an alias of the music artist, DJ, and music producer Kuniyuki Takahashi
- Kuni, a character played by Gedde Watanabe in UHF, who also appeared in an episode of The Weird Al Show

== Geography ==
- Kuni (woreda), Ethiopia
- Kuni, Eastern Cape, a township in Buffalo City, South Africa
- Kuni, Gunma, a former village in Gunma, Japan
- Kuni-kyō, an 8th-century capital of Japan
- Provinces of Japan

== Other uses ==
- Kuni-yuzuri, a mythological event in Japanese prehistory
- Kuni-no-Tokotachi, is a Japanese God
- Kuni no miyatsuko, were officials in ancient Japan
- Kuni language, spoken by 2400 people in Papua New Guinea
- KUNI (FM), a radio station belonging to the University of Northern Iowa, U.S.
- KUNI, the ICAO designation for Gordon K. Bush Airport near Athens, Ohio, U.S.
