= Gōdo Station =

Gōdo Station is the name of three train stations in Japan:

- Gōdo Station (Fukushima) (郷戸駅)
- Gōdo Station (Gifu) (顔戸駅)
- Gōdo Station (Gunma) (神戸駅)
