= Kaniyu Onsen =

Thermal spring

Kaniyu Onsen is a hot spring in Kaniyu, Nikkō, Japan. It is part of the Oku Kinu hot springs group.
