= Kobe Station =

Kobe Station or Kōbe Station is the name of multiple train stations in Japan.

- Kōbe Station (Hyogo) - (神戸駅) on the Tokaido Line and the Sanyo Line (JR Kobe Line) in Chuo-ku, Kobe, Hyogo Prefecture
- Kōsoku Kōbe Station - (高速神戸駅) on the Hanshin Railway Kobe Kosoku Line and the Hankyu Railway Kobe Kosoku Line in Chuo-ku, Kobe, Hyogo Prefecture
- Kobe Station (Nagasaki) - (古部駅) on the Shimabara Railway Line in Unzen, Nagasaki Prefecture
