= Kaneko Shinzaemon =

Kaneko Shinzaemon (金子新左衛門) (fl. 16th century) was a Japanese samurai of the Sengoku period. Senior retainer of Numata Heihachirō. Later served the Hōjō and Uesugi clans. Pledging loyalty to Sanada Masayuki upon the latter's entry into Numata Castle, he later killed Numata Heihachirō.
