= List of cultural properties of Japan – paintings (Hiroshima) =

This list is of the cultural properties of Japan designated in the category of paintings (絵画, kaiga) for the Prefecture of Hiroshima.

== National Cultural Properties ==
As of 1 July 2019, thirteen Important Cultural Properties (including two *National Treasures) have been designated, being of national significance.

Property	Date	Municipality	Ownership	Comments	Image	Dimensions	Coordinates	Ref.
*Fugen Enmei, colour on silk 絹本著色普賢延命像 kenpon chakushoku Fugen Enmei zō	1153	Onomichi	Jikō-ji			149.3 centimetres (58.8 in) by 86.6 centimetres (34.1 in)	34°24′26″N 133°11′45″E	
*Heike Nōkyō 平家納経; Heike nōkyō	1164	Hatsukaichi	Itsukushima Jinja				34°17′45″N 132°19′11″E	
Amida Triad Raigō, gold with blue ground on silk 絹本紺地金彩弥陀三尊来迎図 kenpon konji kinsai Mida sanzon raigō zu	Muromachi period	Hatsukaichi	Kōmyō-in (光明院)			69 centimetres (27 in) by 36 centimetres (14 in)	34°17′49″N 132°19′19″E	
Yamanba, colour on silk, ema by Nagasawa Rosetsu 絹本著色山姥図〈長沢芦雪筆／（絵馬）〉 kenpon chakushoku yamanba zu (Nagasawa Rosetsu hitsu ema)	1795	Hatsukaichi	Itsukushima Jinja			150 centimetres (59 in) by 83 centimetres (33 in)	34°17′45″N 132°19′11″E	
Kobayakawa Takakage, colour on silk 絹本著色小早川隆景像 kenpon chakushoku Kobayakawa Takakage zō	1594	Mihara	Beisan-ji (米山寺)			104.7 centimetres (41.2 in) by 42.2 centimetres (16.6 in)	34°23′28″N 132°59′59″E	
Senju Sengen Kannon, colour on silk 絹本著色千手千眼観音像 kenpon chakushoku senju sengen Kannon zō	Kamakura period	Onomichi	Kōsan-ji			124 centimetres (49 in) by 54 centimetres (21 in)	34°18′20″N 133°05′29″E	
Nirvana painting, colour on silk 絹本著色仏涅槃図 kenpon chakushoku Butsu nehan zu	1274	Onomichi	Jōdo-ji			174.5 centimetres (68.7 in) by 133.5 centimetres (52.6 in)	34°24′43″N 133°12′36″E	
Nirvana painting, colour on silk 絹本著色仏涅槃図 kenpon chakushoku Butsu nehan zu	Kamakura period	Onomichi	Kōsan-ji			152.4 centimetres (60.0 in) by 140.7 centimetres (55.4 in)	34°18′20″N 133°05′29″E	
Mandala of the Two Realms, colour on silk 絹本著色両界曼荼羅図 kenpon chakushoku ryōkai mandara zu	1317	Onomichi	Jōdo-ji	pair of scrolls		Kongōkai: 251 centimetres (99 in) by 185 centimetres (73 in), Taizōkai: 263 centimetres (104 in) by 183.5 centimetres (72.2 in)	34°24′43″N 133°12′36″E	
Yūgyō Shōnin, monochrome on paper 紙本意白描遊行上人絵〈巻第二、第五、第六、第八／〉 shihon i hakubyō Yūgyō Shōnin e	Nanboku-chō period	Onomichi	Jōshō-ji (常称寺)	four handscrolls (2, 5, 6, 7)		30.2 centimetres (11.9 in) by 861.5 centimetres (28 ft 3.2 in) to 1,202.0 centimetres (39 ft 5.2 in)	34°24′45″N 133°12′13″E	
Ki no Tsurayuki from the Thirty-six Poetry Immortals, colour on paper, from the Satake Collection 紙本著色三十六歌仙切〈（貫之）／佐竹家伝来〉 shihon chakushoku sanjūrokkasen setsu (Tsurayuki Satake-ke denrai)	Kamakura period	Onomichi	Kōsan-ji			35.5 centimetres (14.0 in) by 78.2 centimetres (30.8 in)	34°18′20″N 133°05′29″E	
Daitsū Zenji, colour on paper 紙本著色大通禅師像 kenpon chakushoku Daitsū Zenji zō	Nanboku-chō period	Mihara	Buttsū-ji			103 centimetres (41 in) by 41 centimetres (16 in)	34°27′21″N 133°01′36″E	
Landscape of the Four Seasons, ink and light colour on paper, six-panel byōbu 紙本墨画淡彩四季山水図〈／六曲屏風〉 shihon bokuga tansai shiki sansui zu (rokkyoku byōbu)	Muromachi period	Hatsukaichi	Woodone Co Ltd (ウッドワン) (kept at the Woodone Museum of Art (ウッドワン美術館))	pair of screens; traditionally attributed to Shūbun but likely of a later date		150.4 centimetres (59.2 in) by 347 centimetres (137 in)	34°29′56″N 132°08′37″E	

== Prefectural Cultural Properties ==
As of 18 April 2019, fifty-one properties have been designated at a prefectural level.

Property	Date	Municipality	Ownership	Comments	Image	Dimensions	Coordinates	Ref.
Kōbō Daishi, colour on silk 絹本著色弘法大師画像 kenpon chakushoku Kōbō Daishi gazō	early Kamakura period	Sera	Ryūge-ji (龍華寺)			232 centimetres (91 in) by 147 centimetres (58 in)	34°34′57″N 133°03′35″E	
Mizuno Tadashige, colour on silk 絹本著色水野忠重画像 kenpon chakushoku Mizuno Tadashige gazō	1640	Fukuyama	Kenchū-ji (Fukuyama) (賢忠寺)			120 centimetres (47 in) by 52.5 centimetres (20.7 in)	34°29′27″N 133°22′16″E	
Mizuno Katsunari, colour on silk 絹本著色水野勝成画像 kenpon chakushoku Mizuno Katsunari gazō	1645	Fukuyama	Kenchū-ji (Fukuyama) (賢忠寺)			98 centimetres (39 in) by 46 centimetres (18 in)	34°29′27″N 133°22′16″E	
Kōbō Daishi, colour on silk 絹本著色弘法大師画像 kenpon chakushoku Kōbō Daishi gazō	Muromachi period	Fukuyama	Iō-ji (医王寺)	with an ink inscription on the back documenting its theft and recovery in 1699		113 centimetres (44 in) by 77 centimetres (30 in)	34°30′28″N 133°23′27″E	
Pictorial Biography of Kōbō Daishi, colour on silk 絹本著色弘法大師絵伝 kenpon chakushoku Kōbō Daishi e-den	C15	Onomichi	Jōdo-ji			152 centimetres (60 in) by 96 centimetres (38 in)	34°24′43″N 133°12′36″E	
Senju Kannon, colour on silk 絹本著色千手観音像 kenpon chakushoku senju Kannon zō	Kamakura period	Onomichi	Jōdo-ji			171 centimetres (67 in) by 82 centimetres (32 in)	34°24′43″N 133°12′36″E	

== See also ==
- Cultural Properties of Japan
- List of National Treasures of Japan (paintings)
- Japanese painting
- Hiroshima Prefectural Art Museum
- List of Historic Sites of Japan (Hiroshima)
