= Mitsugi =

- Gender: Male

Origin
- Origin: Japanese
- Meaning: Different meanings depending on the kanji used

Mitsugi (written: 貢, 女貢, 貢宜) is a masculine Japanese given name. Notable people with the name include:

- Mitsugi Kishida (岸田 貢宜) (1916–1988), Japanese photographer
- Mitsugi Ohno (大野 貢) (1926–1999), Japanese glassblower
- Mitsugi Saotome (五月 女貢) (born 1937), Japanese aikidoka

Mitsugi (written: 三ツ木) is also a Japanese surname. Notable people with the surname include:

- Kiyotaka Mitsugi (三ツ木 清隆) (born 1953), Japanese actor

== See also ==
- Mitsugi District, Hiroshima (御調郡, Mitsugi-gun), former district in Hiroshima Prefecture, Japan
- Mitsugi, Hiroshima (御調町, Mitsugi-chō), former town in Mitsugi District
