= Hongō, Hiroshima =

Town in Hiroshima Prefecture, Japan

Hongō (本郷町, Hongō-chō) was a town located in Toyota District, Hiroshima Prefecture, Japan

As of 2003, the town had an estimated population of 10,991 and a density of 133.73 persons per km^{2}. The total area was 82.19 km^{2}.

On March 22, 2005, Hongō, along with the town of Daiwa (from Kamo District), and the town of Kui (from Mitsugi District), was merged into the expanded city of Mihara and no longer exists as an independent municipality.
