= Kui, Hiroshima =

Dissolved municipality in Hiroshima prefecture, Japan

Kui (久井町, Kui-chō) was a town located in Mitsugi District, Hiroshima Prefecture, Japan.

As of 2003, the town had an estimated population of 5,392 and a density of 86.73 persons per km^{2}. The total area was 62.17 km^{2}.

On March 22, 2005, Kui, along with the town of Daiwa (from Kamo District), and the town of Hongō (from Toyota District), was merged into the expanded city of Mihara and no longer exists as an independent municipality.
