= Jōdo-ji (Onomichi) =

Buddhist temple in Onomichi, Japan

Coordinates: 34.412167°N 133.210306°E

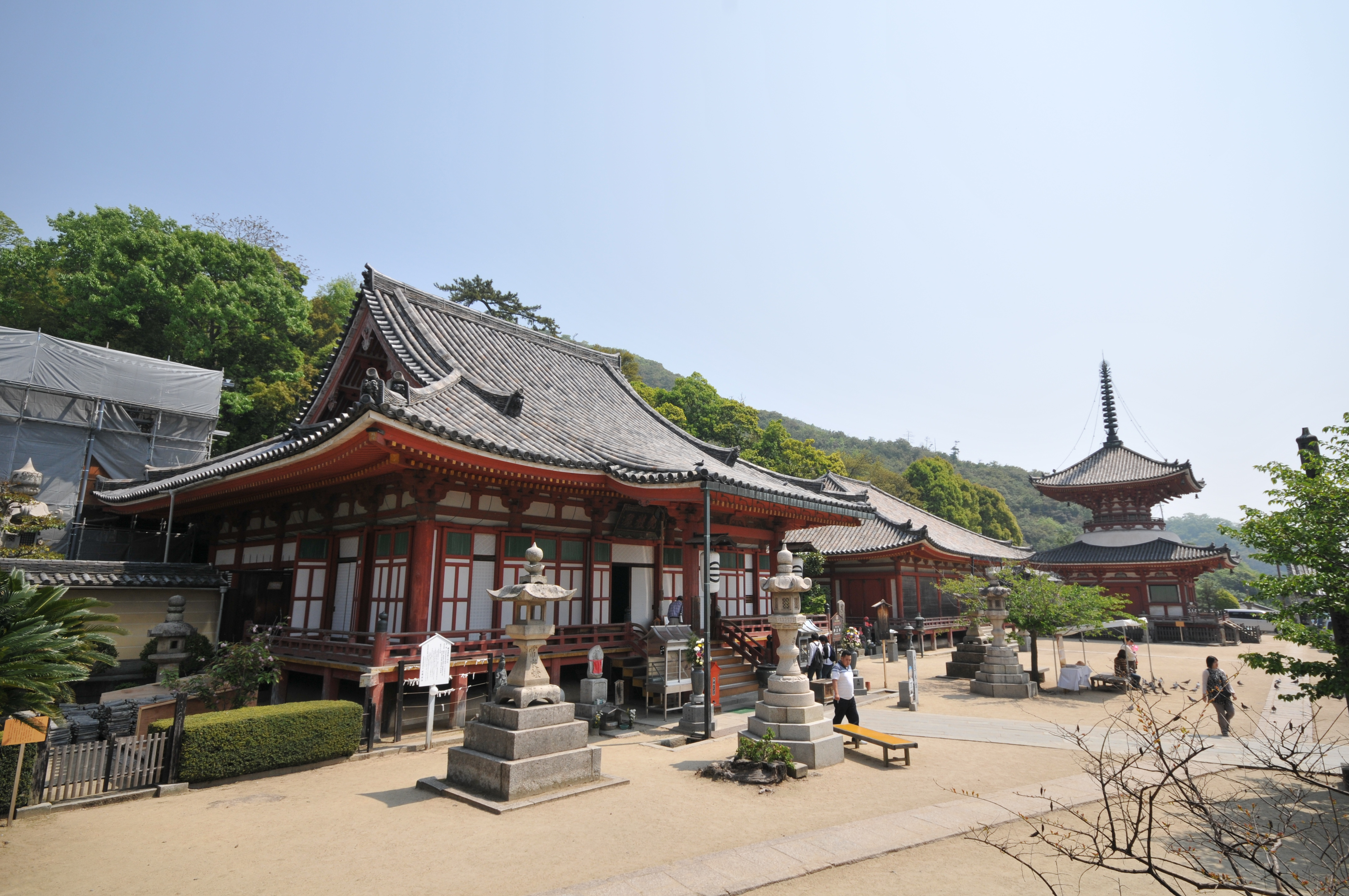
Onomichi Jodoji 05

Jōdo-ji (浄土寺) is a temple of Shingon Buddhism in Onomichi, Hiroshima Prefecture, Japan. As a site sacred to the boddhisattva Kannon, it is the 9th temple on the Chūgoku 33 Kannon Pilgrimage. The temple, built at the end of the Kamakura period, is noted for two national treasures: the temple's main hall (hondō) and the treasure pagoda (tahōtō). In addition it holds a number of Important Cultural Property structures and artworks.

== History ==
Prince Shōtoku is said to have been the founder of the temple. It is certain that there has been a place of prayer at the site since the end of the Heian period. The actual construction took place from 1306 with the construction of the main hall (hon-dō). But as early as 1325 the temple burnt down. Shortly thereafter the most important buildings were rebuilt with the help of the population. An Eleven-faced Goddess of Mercy is worshiped at the temple.

During the Nanboku-chō period, Ashikaga Takauji visited the temple on the way from Kyūshū in 1336 and donated a collection of 33 poems thanking for military success. The collection is still in the possession of the temple and is registered as Japanese Important Cultural Property. Takauji made Jōdo-ji one of the temples for national pacification (Ankoku-ji (安国寺)).

== Temple compound ==
The temple buildings are located halfway up a hill on a plaza stretching east–west from where there is a view on the Inland Sea. The temple precinct is entered from the south through the front gate (山門, sanmon) which is a four-legged gate (Note: (shikyakumon, 四脚門): a single-storied gate with two main pillars in line with the ridge of the roof and a pair of supporting square posts ("legs") on either side. generally with a gabled roof) in kirizuma style, (Note: (kirizuma-zukuri, 切妻造): a gabled roof with equal lengths from the ridge to the eaves) with hongawara type (Note: (hongawarabuki, 本瓦葺): a tile roof composed of flat broad concave tiles and semi-cylindrical convex tiles covering the seams of the former) shingles. The sanmon dates to 1333–1392 and has been designated as Important Cultural Property (ICP). Its kaerumata, (Note: (kaerumata, 蟇股): "frog leg strut", a strut with legs spread like those of a frog) frog leg struts, have been decorated with the family crest of the Ashikaga clan.

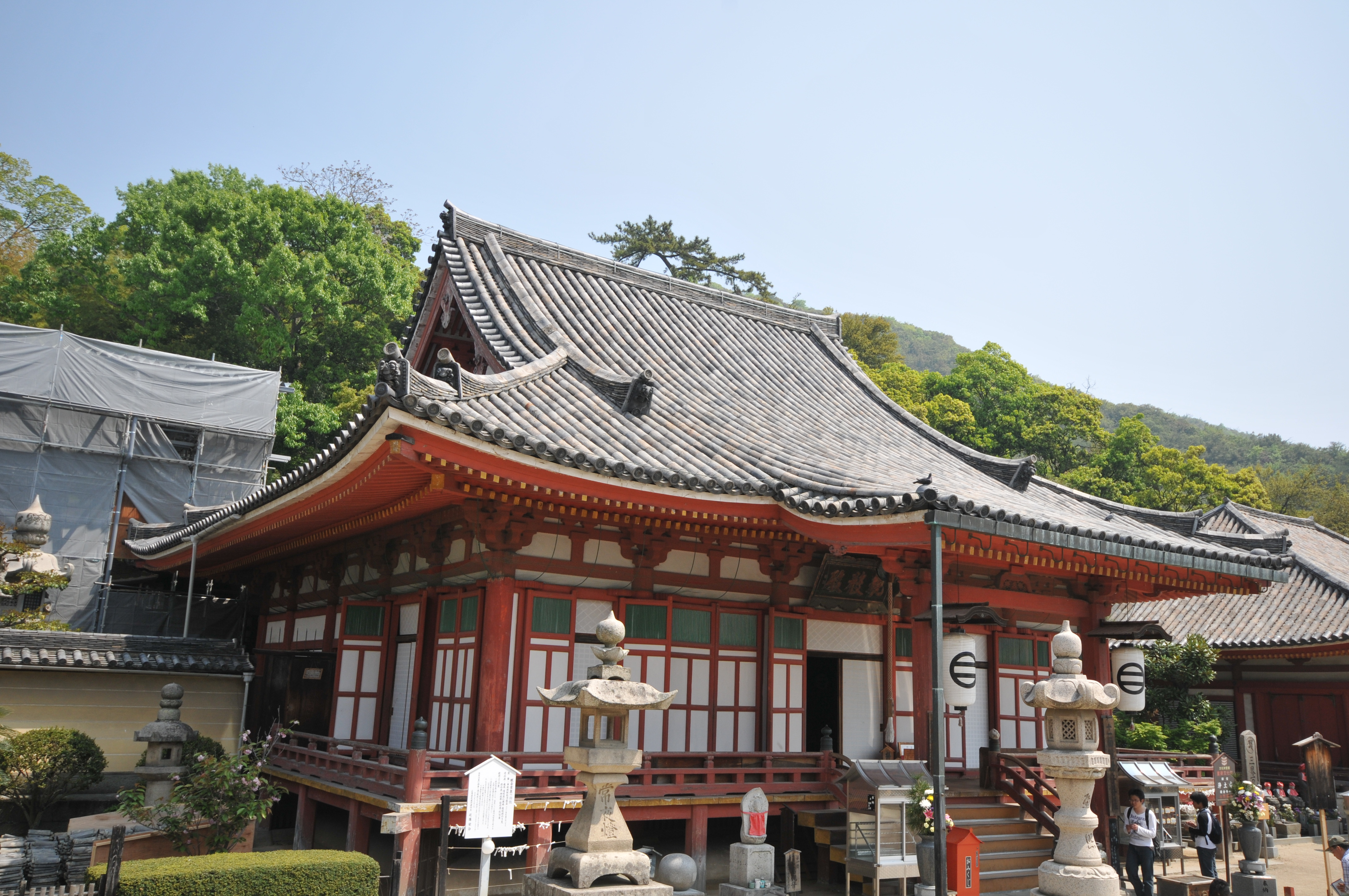
Main Hall

Facing the sanmon is the Main Hall (本堂, hon-dō). Built by the carpenter Fujiwara Tomokuni (藤原友国) in 1327 in the Japanese style (wayō) and later—with the addition of a front porch—adapted to the Zen style, it has been designated as National Treasure. The hall is a 5×5 ken, single-storied, irimoya style (Note: (irimoya-zukuri, 入母屋造): a hip-and-gable roof combining a ridge and two gable pediments on the upper part with a hipped roof on all sides in the lower part of the roof) structure with a 1 ken step canopy, hongawarabuki roof.

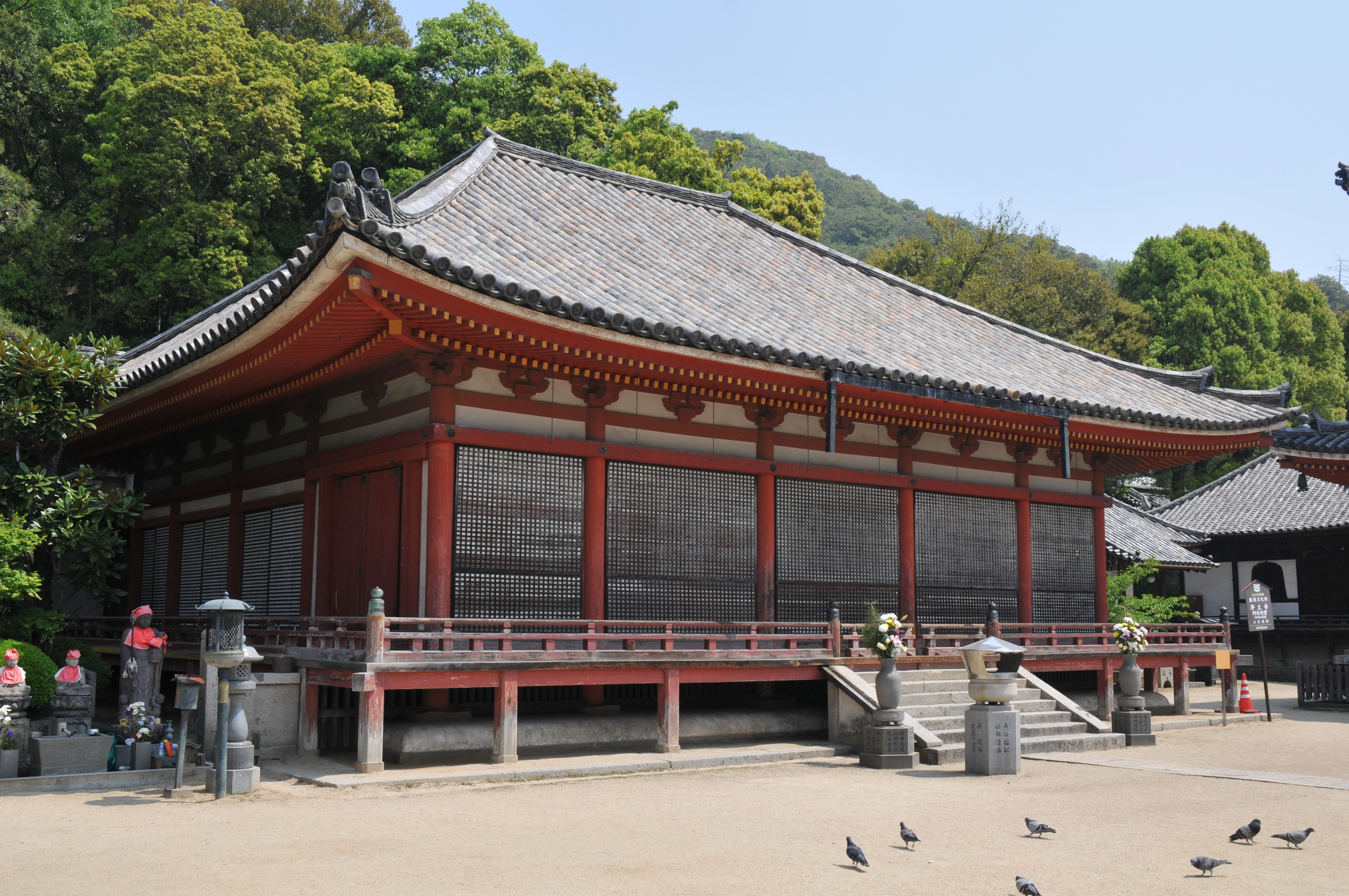
Amida Hall

Directly to the right or east of the Main Hall is the Amida Hall (阿弥陀堂, Amida-dō; ICP). This hall, dedicated to Amida, "The Buddha of Immeasurable Life and Light" who rules over the Western Paradis or the Pure land was built in 1345. It is a 5×4 ken, 9 m (30 ft) wide, single-storied structure in yosemune style, (Note: (yosemune-zukuri, 寄棟造): a hipped roof where the front and back are trapezoidal and the sides triangular in shape; in Japan generally used for buildings of less importance) with hongawarabuki roof. A seated image of Amida Nyōrai is enshrined in this building.

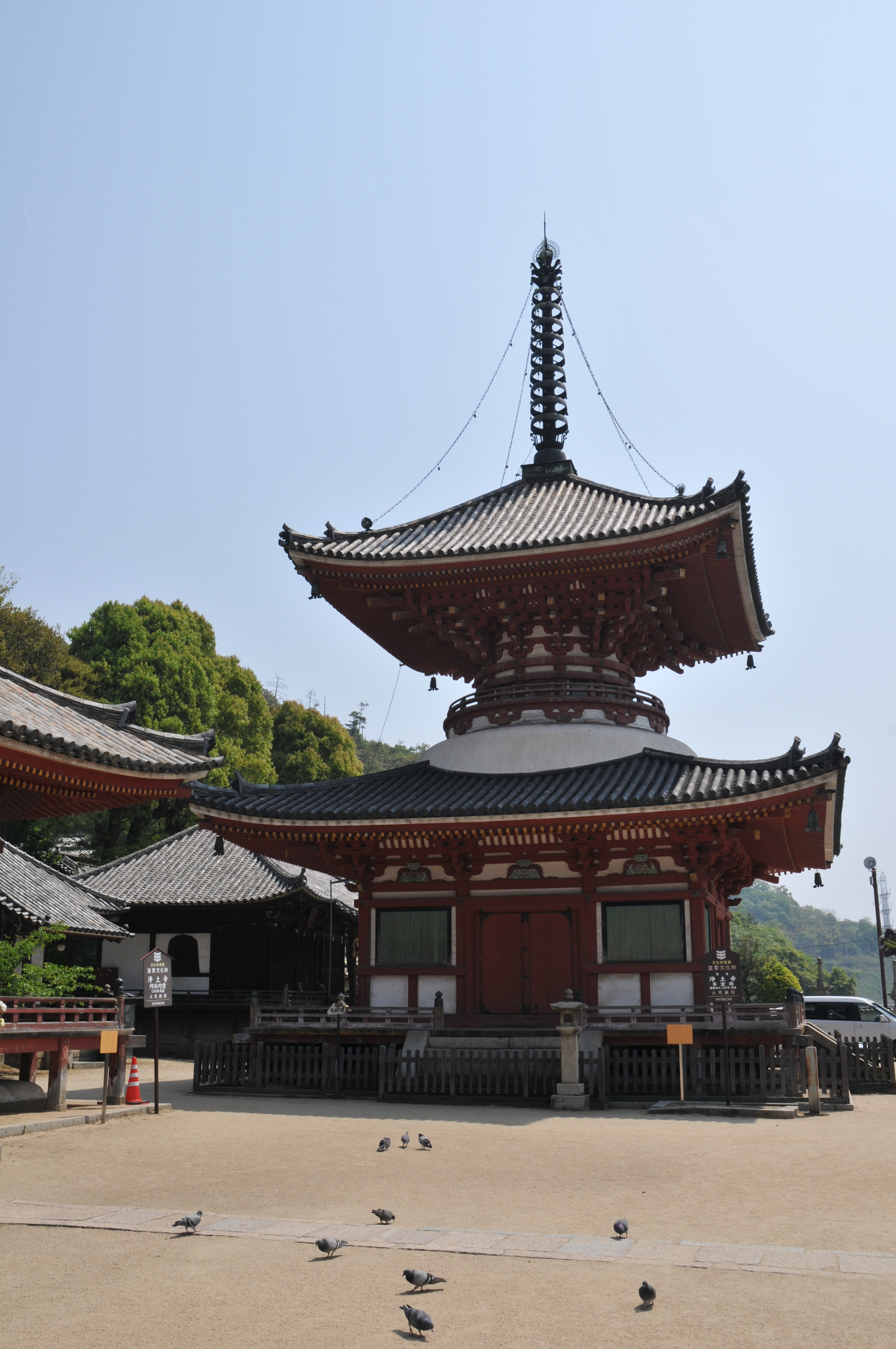
Treasure pagoda

The main temple structures are completed by the Treasure pagoda (多宝塔, tahōtō), a 3×3 ken, two-storied Buddhist tower, with hongawarabuki roof, dating to 1328 and designated as National Treasure. It enshrines an image of Dainichi Nyorai with attendants. The interior walls are painted with images of the Eight Patriarchs of Shingon Buddhism. During reconstruction works in 1936, many sutra scrolls and other items were discovered in the roof's finial (sōrin). Unlike the Main Hall and the Amida Hall which are aligned in east-westerly direction, the treasure pagoda is moved a bit south into the plaza, positioning it to the south-east of the Amida Hall.

A number of service buildings occupies the western end of the temple precinct. Directly to the northwest of the hōn-dō is the abbot's residence (方丈, hōjō; ICP). Built in 1690 from donations by the Hashimoto family, wealthy merchants from Onomichi, this building is a 16.7 by 13.1 m (55 by 43 ft), single-storied, yosemune style structure with hongawarabuki roof tiles.

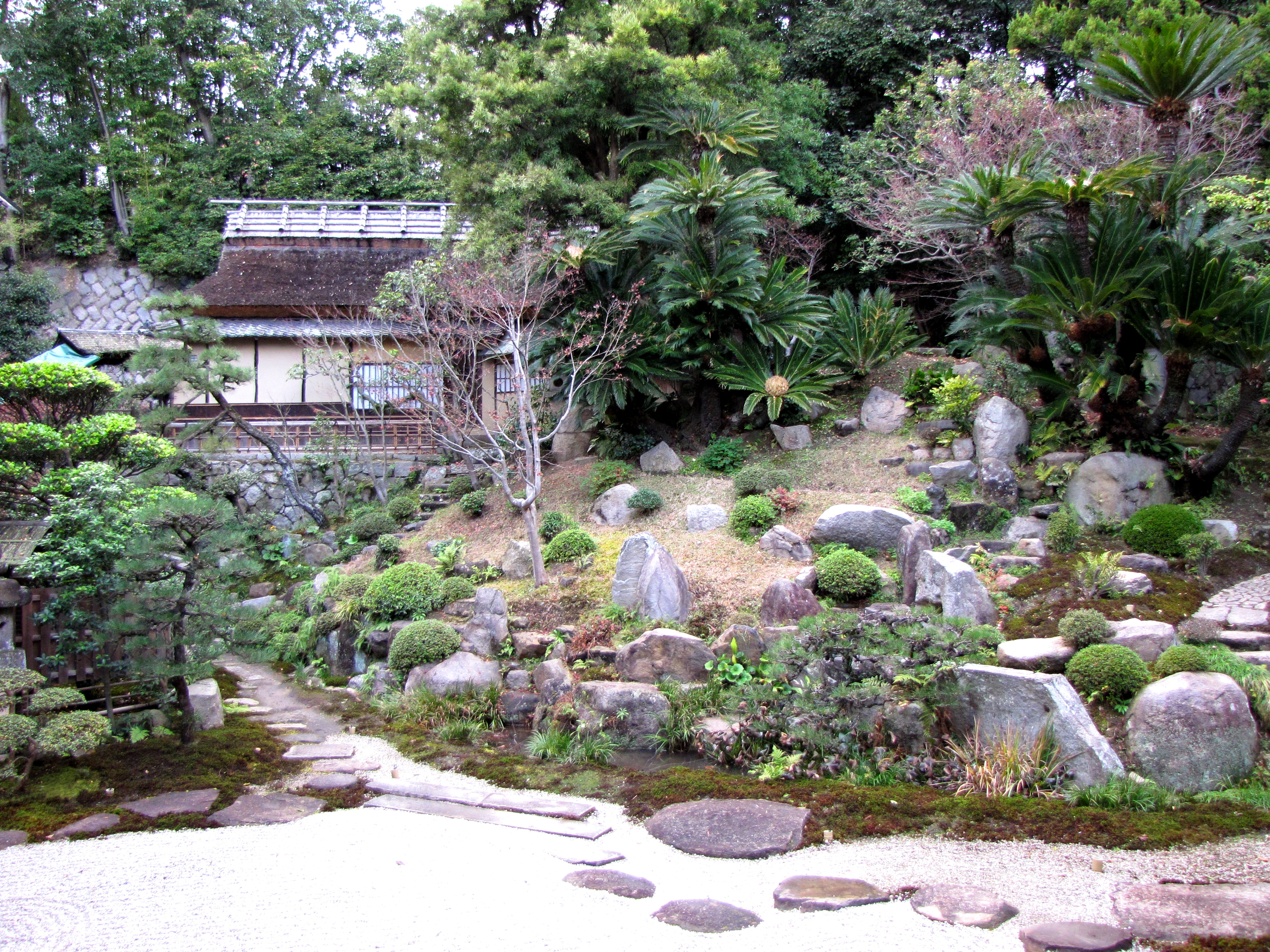
Garden with Roteki-an tea house

To the west rising from a patch of white gravel next to the hōjō and extending up the hillside lies the temple garden (庭園) which has been laid out in 1806 and designated as Place of Scenic Beauty. From the center of the garden a cascade drops down ending in a small pond. On the top of an artificial hill at the back of the garden is the tea house known as Roteki-an (露滴庵, ICP). It was donated in 1814 by the Tomishima family, a wealthy merchant family from Mukaishima across the strait. According to unconfirmed history, this tea house was originally found inside Fushimi Castle from where it was moved to Hongan-ji, Kyoto until it was disassembled in the late 16th/early 17th century and became property of the Tomishima family. Roteki-an is a single-storied, irimoya style structure with thatched roof. Inside it has a three-mat space for guests and a temaeza (seat for host) in the daime style (3/4 mat). There is a (shōbanseki, 相伴席) mat for additional or special guests.

Just south of the Roteki-an lies the storehouse (宝庫, hōko; ICP), built in the style of the traditional kura storehouses. It is a double-storied kirizuma style structure, 6.0 by 3.9 m (19.7 by 12.8 ft) in size with hongawarabuki roof and dates to 1759.

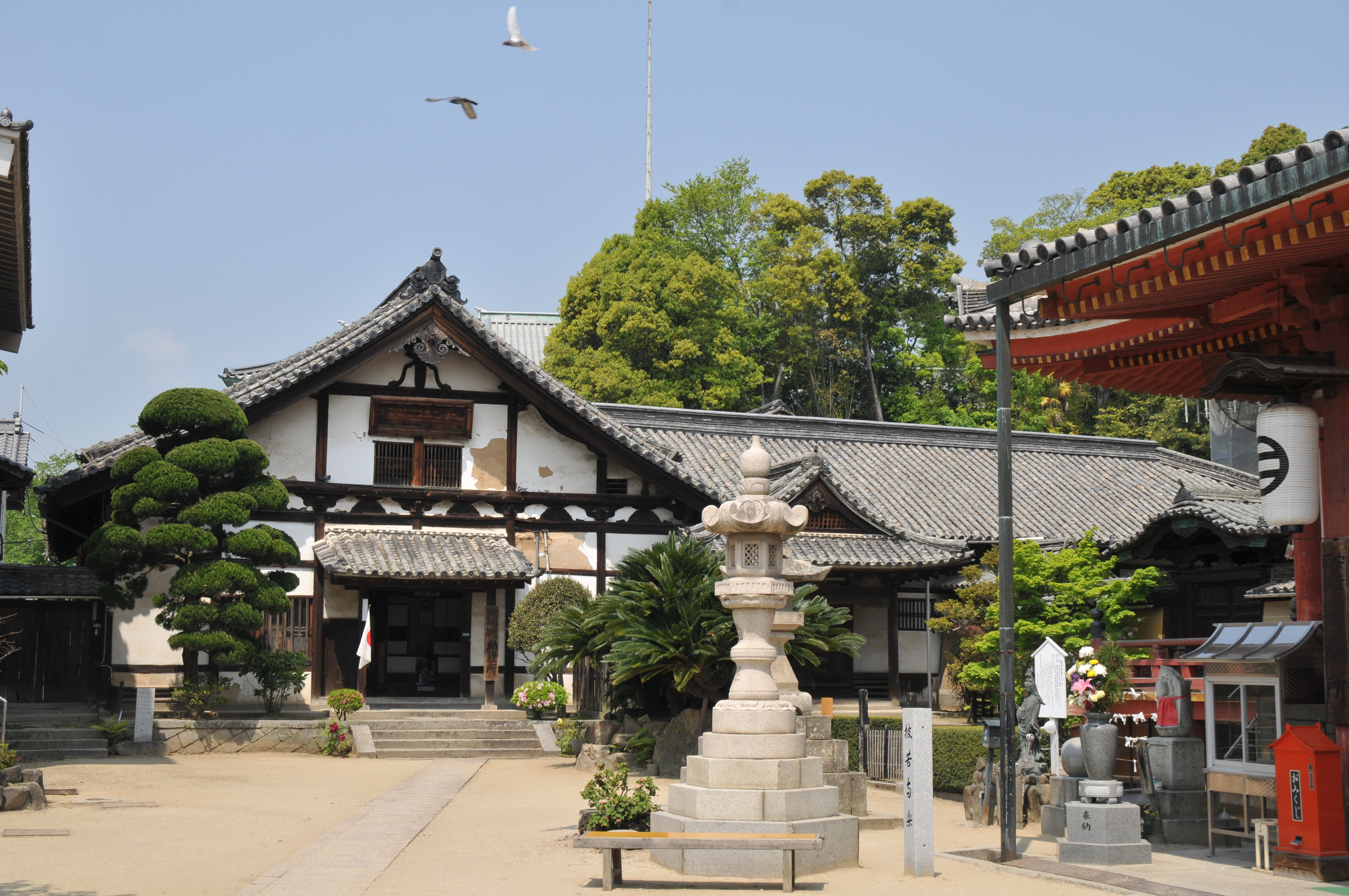
Kuri with kyakuden (right)

East of the hōko, lies the kuri (庫裏; ICP) with the guest hall (客殿, kyakuden; ICP) extending north from it towards the garden. They were built in 1719. The kuri is entered from its prominent gable facade (tsumairi) which opens towards the main plaza. Kuri were originally primarily used for food preparation but came to contain administrative and living quarters of the monks. The kuri is a 15.9 by 12.0 m (52.2 by 39.4 ft) kirizuma style structure. The kyakuden encircles a small courtyard. The eastern wing, in yosemune style runs in north–south direction and contains the drawing or guest rooms. It measures 18.0 by 7.0 m (59.1 by 23.0 ft) and has an attached entranceway facing the plaza in the east. The western wing is 5.0 by 7.2 m (16.4 by 23.6 ft) kirizuma style. A living room is found in the 12.8 by 4.0 m (42.0 by 13.1 ft) southern wing and a tea room in the 5.9 by 4.2 m (19 by 14 ft) northern wing which is in the kirizuma style. All parts have hongawarabuki roofs except for the northern wing and a small two-storied structure in the western wing which have sangawarabuki tile roofs. (Note: (sangawarabuki, 桟瓦葺): a roof tile combining a broad concave tile with a semi-cylindrical convex tile into one tile. The tile is square undulating from concave to convex.) Passing through a building in the south-west corner of the precinct, a 14.9 by 5.0 m (48.9 by 16.4 ft) kirizuma style back gate (裏門, uramon; ICP) with hongawarabuki roof from the late 18th century, a type of Nagayamon (長屋門), provides access from the outside to the back of the kuri.

There is a small Japanese rock garden surrounded by the kyakuden to the west, the hōjō to the north, the hōn-dō to the east and by a wall with a Karamon (唐門) gate to the south. This gate, made entirely of Japanese elm is a small 1×1 ken structure with hongawarabuki roof and dates to 1712. It was relocated in 1719 from its original position between the Main Hall and the Amida Hall. A couple of Shinto shrines and the Monju-dō (文殊堂), a small hall dedicated to Monju, the Bodhisattva of wisdom, are found beyond the tahōtō at the eastern end of the temple precincts.

=== Stone pagodas ===
There are three notable stone pagodas, designated as Important Cultural Property, found on the temple grounds: one Nōkyōtō (納経塔, lit. "sutra offering tower") and two in the Hōkyōintō (宝篋印塔) style. The Nōkyōtō is located next to the eastern wall of the temple and is a 2.7 m (8 ft 10 in) tall stone hōtō. It was built in the 10th month of 1278 by Kōa Yoshichika, as a memorial tower for his father, a wealthy Onomichi businessman. Inside the pagoda various holy scriptures were deposited as offering, such as the Lotus Sutra, The Three Pure Land Sutras and the Brahmajala Sutra.

Just north of the nōkyōtō is one of the hōkyōintō, a 3.2 m (10 ft) high pagoda with a notable lotus petal design (kaeribana) at the base. It was erected on the 1st day of the 10th month, 1348 to commemorate among others the monk Gyoen (行円) and Emperor Kōkō.

Another hōkyōintō, from the Nanboku-chō period (1333–1392) known as "tomb of Ashikaga Takauji", is found at the southern wall of the temple grounds. 1.9 m (6 ft 3 in) tall, this tower shows particularly fine carving work. Both hōkyōintō contain shuji seed syllables of among others the Four Buddhas of the Diamond Realm (金剛界四仏, kongōkai shibutsu).

== Notable Treasures ==
The treasure hall (宝物館, hōmotsukan) holds a number of Buddhist sculptures, paintings, crafts articles and written materials, some of which have been designated as Important Cultural Properties.

=== Sculptures ===
The principal image of the temple is a 9th-century early Heian period standing sculpture of the Eleven-faced Goddess of Mercy made of colored hinoki wood and designated as Important Cultural Property. Its right hand is bestowing the gift of fearlessness (abhayadāna) while a vase is placed in the left hand.

Three Shōtoku sculptures from the Kamakura and Nanboku-chō periods have been designated as Important Cultural Properties. Each of the three is made of several pieces of wood in the yoseki-zukuri style. They are all colored, have crystal eyes (玉眼, gyokugan) and are housed in the temple's treasure hall. Inside of the statues ink inscriptions were found informing of the date and circumstance of the works.

The oldest of these statues dates to 1303, is 94 cm (37 in) tall with the mizura hairstyle holding an incense burner in both hands in front of his body. According to tradition it shows Shōtoku at the age of 16 years. It is said to have been made by the Buddhist novice Jōshō (定証) on occasion of his son's death. This sculpture is known as Kōyō-zō (孝養像; lit. "statue of filial piety").

Namu-butsu Shōtoku-zō (南無仏太子像, lit. "praise Buddha Shōtoku statue") from 1337 is a 68 cm (27 in) tall image of a kneeling three year old Shōtoku with his hands folded in prayer. He is wearing a red ancient skirt (裳) with the upper part of the body naked. Like the "filial piety"-Shōtoku it is a work of the Kyoto sculptor 院憲.

A third statue known as Sesshō-zō (摂政像, lit. "regent statue") from 1339 is 1.35 m (4 ft 5 in) tall. Unlike other regent statues where a ritual baton (shaku) is held by both hands, here Shōtoku has the shaku in his right hand while an incense burner is placed in the left hand.

=== Paintings ===
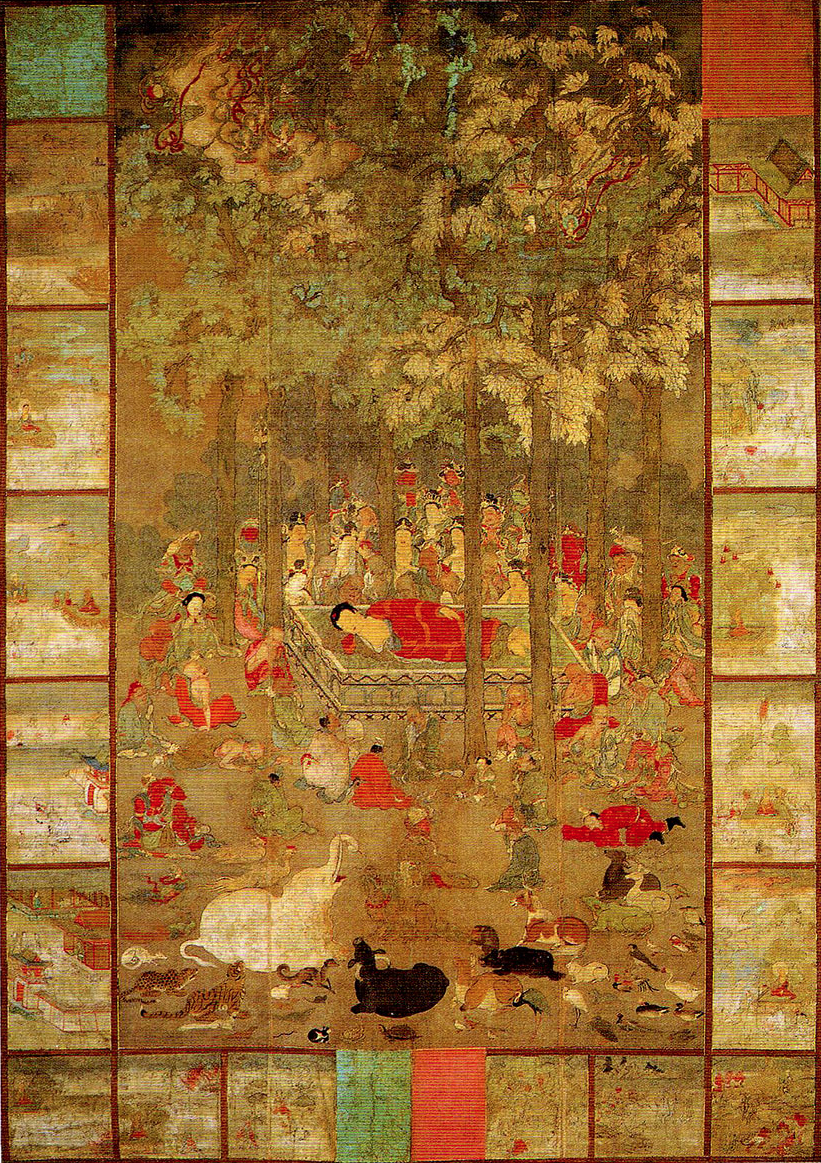
Nirvana painting

The temple's treasure hall houses two Important Cultural Properties in the painting category. One is a Nirvana painting from 1274 depicting the historical Buddha on his deathbed surrounded by mourners and animals. The painting is executed with colour on silk and measures 174.5 by 133.5 centimetres (68.7 by 52.6 in). Scenes from the life of the Buddha are drawn in 16 panels along the left, bottom and right border of the painting.

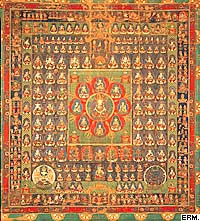

The Mandala of the Two Realms (両界曼荼羅図, Ryōkai mandara-zu) is a set of two mandalas painted on silk depicting the Diamond and Womb Realm respectively. The work has an inscription in ink dating it to the year 1317. The two paintings measure 251.0 by 185.0 cm (98.8 by 72.8 in) (Diamond) and 263.0 by 183.5 cm (103.5 by 72.2 in) (Womb) respectively.

=== Crafts ===
Jōdo-ji owns two notable and similar sutra boxes from 1315, differing in size, originating from China and designated as Important Cultural Properties. The Sutra Box with peacock design in gold (孔雀戧金経箱, kujakusō kinkyōbako) came into the possession of Jōdo-ji in 1358 to hold a copy of the Golden Light Sutra as translated into Chinese by the monk I Ching. Covered on the inside with red lacquer and outside black lacquer, the lid contains the character 首 ("head") and the body the character 性. This box has dimensions 40 by 22 by 25 cm (15.7 by 8.7 by 9.8 in). It is in custody of the Nara National Museum.

The second, larger Sutra Box with design of peacock in gold inlay (孔雀文沈金経箱, kujakusō kinkyōbako) has dimensions 54 by 36 by 29 cm (21 by 14 by 11 in) but is otherwise similar in design. On the sides of the body of the box are a pair of peacock and a pair of Onagadori, long-tailed chicken. The cover contains the character 天 on the front and 性, 静, 情, 逸 engraved in the four corners.

=== Writings ===
The temple's treasure hall holds four notable articles of written materials designated as Important Cultural Properties. The oldest of these is a copy of volume 7 of the Lotus Sutra on navy blue paper with gold and silver paint (紺紙金銀泥法華経, konshi kingin-dei hokekyō) an example of a mid-Heian period ornamental sutra. Initially it alternates between columns in gold and silver paint while the latter part is written in gold only. At the end of the 27.5 by 671 cm (10.8 by 264.2 in) scroll the date of completion is given as 22nd day of the 6th month, 949.

The Kamakura period shihon bokusho jōshō kishōmon (紙本墨書定証起請文) from 1306, written by Jōshō (定証), a disciple of the Shingon priest Eison (1201–1290) from Saidai-ji, is a written vow to the gods (起請文, kishomon) created during the time of the rebuilding of Jōdo-ji. The document contains a vermillion handprint by Jōshō.

Another treasure is the Kanzeon Hōraku Waka (観世音法楽和歌), a set of 33 waka poems on a 31.5 by 257 cm (12.4 by 101.2 in) scroll connected to a military campaign by Ashikaga Takauji. During the Kenmu era, Ashikaga Takauji, on the way to Kyushu stopped at Jōdo-ji to pray for military success at the temple's Kannon Bodhisattva. Later, on the 5th day of the 5th month, 1336, on the way back to Kyoto, he stopped by again and together with five of his sons had this scroll offered to the Eleven-faced goddess of mercy, the principal object of worship of Jōdo-ji. Seven of the poems are by Ashikaga Takauji and the scroll also contains Takauji's signature.

The treasure known as Jōdo-ji documents (紙本墨書浄土寺文書, shihon bokusho Jōdo-ji monjo) consists of 11 ancient documents from the 14th century Nanboku-chō period and the first half of the 15th century Muromachi period. The documents deal with the temple's annual tribute and contain among others a donation letter by Ashikaga Takauji and the seal of Ashikaga Yoshinori. A related set of 104 documents has been designated as Prefectural Important Cultural Property.

== In popular culture ==
In the 1953 movie Tokyo Story directed by Yasujirō Ozu, the temple is prominently featured as a place near the residence of the elderly couple, Shūkichi and Tomi. The view from Jōdo-ji is shown and remarked at in the movie and it also appears in other scenes. Tomi's funeral is at Jōdo-ji.

== See also ==
- List of National Treasures of Japan (temples)
