= Daiwa, Hiroshima =

Former town in Hiroshima Prefecture, Japan

Daiwa (大和町, Daiwa-chō) was a town located in Kamo District, Hiroshima Prefecture, Japan.

As of 2003, the town had an estimated population of 7,262 and a density of 59.58 persons per km^{2}. The total area was 121.88 km^{2}.

On March 22, 2005, Daiwa, along with the town of Kui (from Mitsugi District), and the town of Hongō (from Toyota District), was merged into the expanded city of Mihara and no longer exists as an independent municipality.
