= Wood One Museum of Art =

- ウッドワン美術館
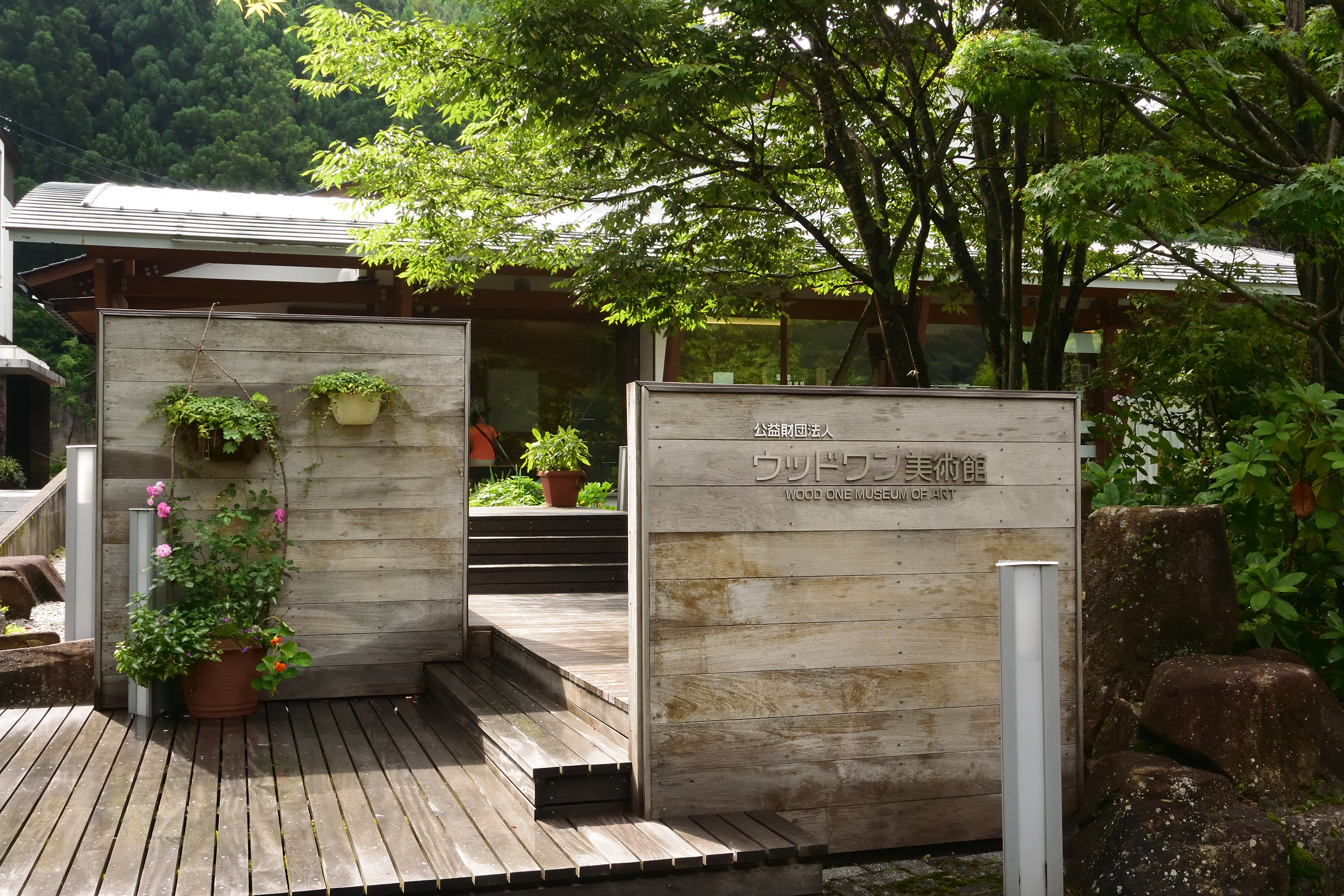

General information
- Location: 4278 Yoshiwa, Hatsukaichi, Hiroshima Prefecture, Japan
- Coordinates: 34°29′56″N 132°08′37″E
- Opened: September 1996

Website
- www.woodone-museum.jp

Wood One Museum of Art (ウッドワン美術館, Uddo-Wan Bijutsukan) opened in Hatsukaichi, Hiroshima Prefecture, Japan in 1996. The collection of some 800 works acquired by the Wood One Company (株式会社ウッドワン) centres around Modern Japanese Painting, Meissen porcelain, Art Nouveau glass, Qing ceramics, and Satsuma ware of the Bakumatsu and Meiji periods, and includes paintings by Kishida Ryūsei, Renoir, and Van Gogh.

== See also ==
- List of Cultural Properties of Japan - paintings (Hiroshima)
- Hiroshima Prefectural Art Museum
- Itsukushima Jinja
