= Mihara, Hiroshima =

Mihara 三原市
- City
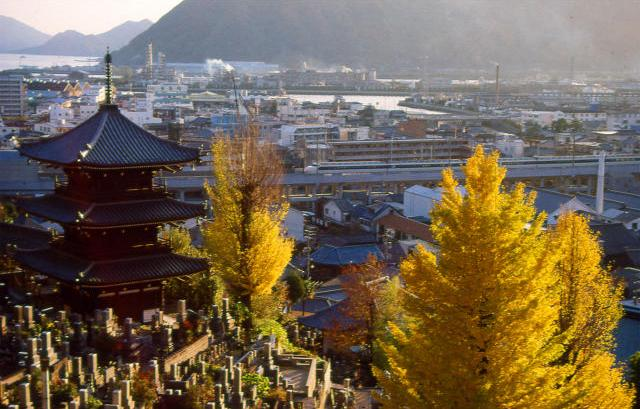

- Flag Emblem
- Interactive map of Mihara
- Location in Japan
- Coordinates: 34°23′51″N 133°04′43″E
- Country: Japan
- Region: Chūgoku (San'yō)
- Prefecture: Hiroshima
- Town status: April 1, 1889
- City status: November 15, 1936

Government
  - Mayor: Yoshihiro Okada (from August 2020)

Area
  - Total: 471.55 km^{2} (182.07 sq mi)

Population (April 30, 2023)
  - Total: 88,591
  - Density: 187.87/km^{2} (486.59/sq mi)
- Time zone: UTC+09:00 (JST)
- City hall address: 3-5-1, Minatomachi, Mihara-shi, Hiroshima-ken 723-8601
- Climate: Cfa
- Website: Official website
- Symbols
- Flower: Ume and Satsuki azalea
- Tree: Camphor laurel

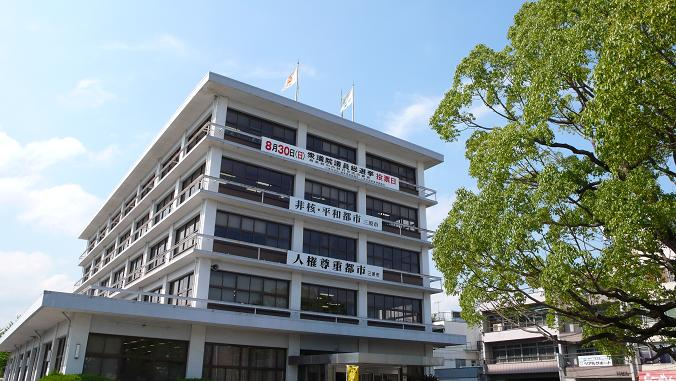
Mihara City Hall

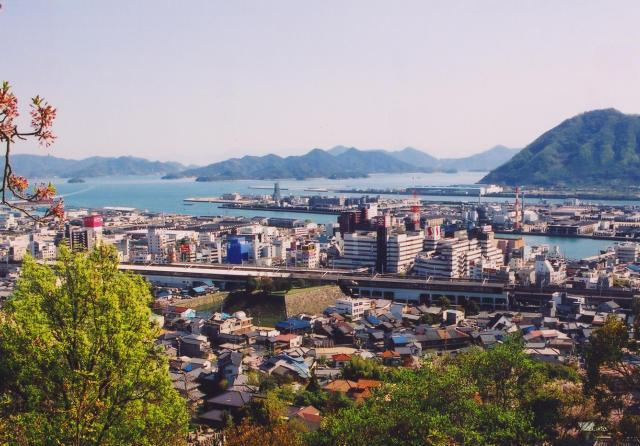
Mihara City parorama

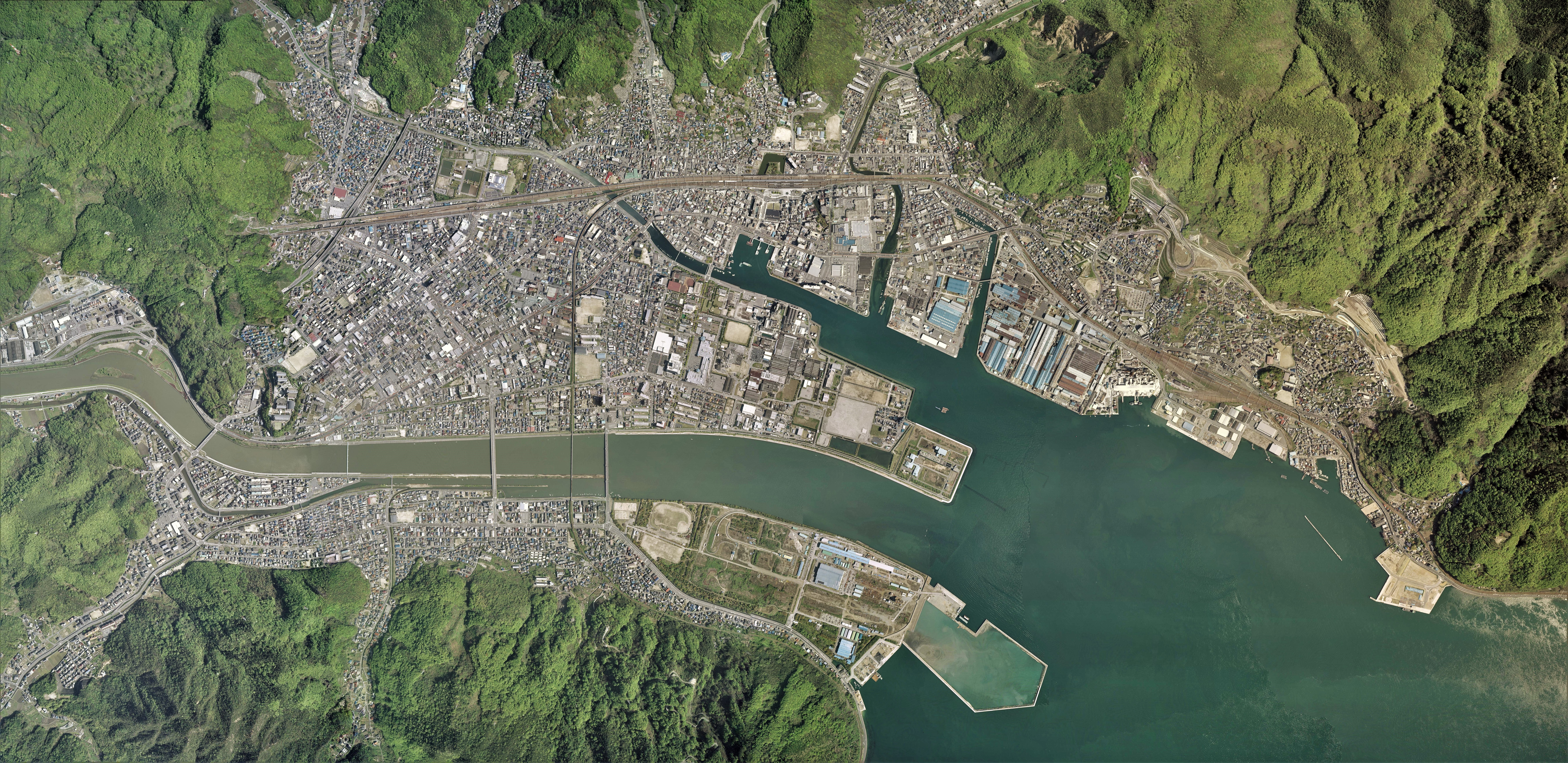
Aerial photo of Mihara City center

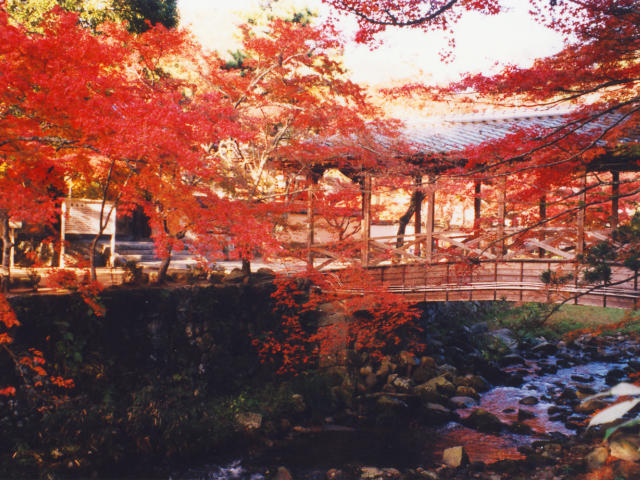
Butsu-ji

Mihara (三原市, Mihara-shi) is a city located in Hiroshima Prefecture, Japan. As of 30 April 2023, the city had an estimated population of 88,591 in 43253 households and a population density of 190 persons per km^{2}. The total area of the city is 258.14 square kilometres (99.67 sq mi).

== Geography ==
Mihara is located in south-central Hiroshima Prefecture. It faces the Seto Inland Sea to the south, and part of the coastline forms part of the Setonaikai National Park. The origin of the name of "Mihara" is from the alluvial fans of Yubara, Komagahara, and Konishihara Rivers. The Numata River, a second-class river that originates from the Kamo plateau of Higashihiroshima City, flows through the center of the city, and the central urban area flourishes at its mouth. Most of the current central city area is reclaimed land, and steep mountains approach the coastline, while the northern part is a highland area with an elevation of 400 meters or more at the southern tip of Kibi Plateau, and the western part is mostly hilly.

=== Adjoining municipalities ===
Hiroshima Prefecture

- Higashihiroshima
- Onomichi
- Sera
- Takehara

=== Climate ===
Mihara has a humid subtropical climate (Köppen climate classification Cfa) characterized by cool to mild winters and hot, humid summers. The average annual temperature in Mihara is 14.2 °C (57.6 °F). The average annual rainfall is 1,374.6 mm (54.12 in) with July as the wettest month. The temperatures are highest on average in August, at around 25.9 °C (78.6 °F), and lowest in January, at around 2.9 °C (37.2 °F). The highest temperature ever recorded in Mihara was 36.3 °C (97.3 °F) on 24 July 2018; the coldest temperature ever recorded was −9.4 °C (15.1 °F) on 16 January 2011.

Climate data for Hiroshima Airport, Mihara (2003−2020 normals, extremes 2003−present)
Month	Jan	Feb	Mar	Apr	May	Jun	Jul	Aug	Sep	Oct	Nov	Dec	Year
Record high °C (°F)	14.6 (58.3)	19.3 (66.7)	22.0 (71.6)	27.3 (81.1)	29.4 (84.9)	32.1 (89.8)	36.3 (97.3)	35.8 (96.4)	34.9 (94.8)	29.0 (84.2)	24.9 (76.8)	19.6 (67.3)	36.3 (97.3)
Mean daily maximum °C (°F)	7.2 (45.0)	8.5 (47.3)	12.2 (54.0)	17.7 (63.9)	22.6 (72.7)	25.2 (77.4)	28.6 (83.5)	30.4 (86.7)	26.6 (79.9)	21.2 (70.2)	15.3 (59.5)	9.3 (48.7)	18.7 (65.7)
Daily mean °C (°F)	2.9 (37.2)	3.9 (39.0)	7.2 (45.0)	12.6 (54.7)	17.6 (63.7)	21.0 (69.8)	24.6 (76.3)	25.9 (78.6)	22.3 (72.1)	16.7 (62.1)	11.0 (51.8)	5.2 (41.4)	14.2 (57.6)
Mean daily minimum °C (°F)	−0.9 (30.4)	−0.1 (31.8)	2.5 (36.5)	7.8 (46.0)	13.1 (55.6)	17.5 (63.5)	21.6 (70.9)	22.7 (72.9)	19.0 (66.2)	13.1 (55.6)	7.2 (45.0)	1.4 (34.5)	10.4 (50.7)
Record low °C (°F)	−9.4 (15.1)	−8.3 (17.1)	−4.7 (23.5)	−0.6 (30.9)	3.5 (38.3)	10.7 (51.3)	15.4 (59.7)	15.8 (60.4)	10.9 (51.6)	4.1 (39.4)	−2.2 (28.0)	−7.2 (19.0)	−9.4 (15.1)
Average precipitation mm (inches)	33.4 (1.31)	53.9 (2.12)	88.0 (3.46)	115.3 (4.54)	133.4 (5.25)	189.7 (7.47)	240.8 (9.48)	140.6 (5.54)	152.3 (6.00)	105.6 (4.16)	64.4 (2.54)	57.2 (2.25)	1,374.6 (54.12)
Average precipitation days (≥ 1.0 mm)	4.8	7.4	9.0	9.3	8.7	10.4	10.9	7.7	8.7	6.9	6.1	6.4	96.3
Source: Japan Meteorological Agency

=== Demographics ===
Per Japanese census data, the population of Mihara in 2020 is 90,573 people. Mihara has been conducting censuses since 1960.

Historical population
Year	Pop.	±%
1950	111,480	—
1955	112,720	+1.1%
1960	109,641	−2.7%
1965	108,059	−1.4%
1970	106,376	−1.6%
1975	107,602	+1.2%
1980	109,236	+1.5%
1985	111,108	+1.7%
1990	110,524	−0.5%
1995	108,617	−1.7%
2000	106,229	−2.2%
2005	104,196	−1.9%
2010	100,449	−3.6%
2015	96,194	−4.2%
2020	90,573	−5.8%
Mihara population statistics

== History ==
The Mihara area is part of ancient Aki Province and has been settled since prehistoric times. The area has many burial mounds from the Kofun period. During the Sengoku Period, Mihara developed as a jōkamachi around Mihara Castle, the stronghold of Kobayakawa Takakage from 1582. Following the 1600 Battle of Sekigahara, Fukushima Masanori was granted Aki Province, which he ruled from Hiroshima Castle; Mihara Castle has retained as a branch castle. In 1619, his holdings were divided between Fukuyama Domain and Hiroshima Domain, with Mihara becoming part of the holdings of the Asano clan of Hiroshima. Following the Meiji restoration, the town of Mihara was established on April 1, 1889, with the creation of the modern municipalities system. Mihara merged with the town of Itozaki and several neighboring villages to become the city of Mihara on November 15, 1936.

On March 22, 2005, the town of Daiwa (from Kamo District), the town of Kui (from Mitsugi District), and the town of Hongō (from Toyota District) were merged into Mihara.

== Government ==
Mihara has a mayor-council form of government with a directly elected mayor and a unicameral city council of 25 members. Mihara, collectively with the town of Sera, contributes three members to the Hiroshima Prefectural Assembly.

In terms of national politics, Mihara is part of the Hiroshima 5th district of the lower house of the Diet of Japan.

== Economy ==
Mihara is a key point of transportation in Hiroshima Prefecture, with major transportation infrastructure, such as the Sanyo Shinkansen, Sanyo Main Line, Mihara Port, Hiroshima Airport, and Sanyo Expressway. The city is a center for heavy industry, with metallurgical and chemical-related companies in the coastal areas, and electronic equipment-related companies in the inland industrial parks. In terms of agriculture, citrus fruits are grown in coastal areas, and paddy rice and fruit trees are cultivated in mountainous areas.

== Education ==
Mihara has 20 public elementary schools, and ten public junior high schools operated by the city government, and three public high schools operated by the Hiroshima Prefectural Board of Education. The prefecture also operates one special education school for the disabled. There is also one national elementary school, one national junior high schools. two private junior high schools and two private high schools.

The Prefectural University of Hiroshima has a campus in Mihara.

== Transportation ==
=== Airports ===
- Hiroshima Airport

=== Railway ===
JR West – San'yō Shinkansen

- Mihara

JR West (JR West) - San'yō Main Line

- Itozaki - Mihara - Hongō

JR West (JR West) - Kure Line

- Mihara - Sunami - Akisaizaki

=== Highways ===
- San'yō Expressway
- National Route 2
- National Route 185
- National Route 432
- National Route 486

=== Ports ===
- Mihara Port
- Onomichi-itozaki Port
- Sagi Port
- Sunami Port

== Sister city relations ==
- – Palmerston North, New Zealand
- – Yugawara, Kanagawa, Japan

== Local attractions ==
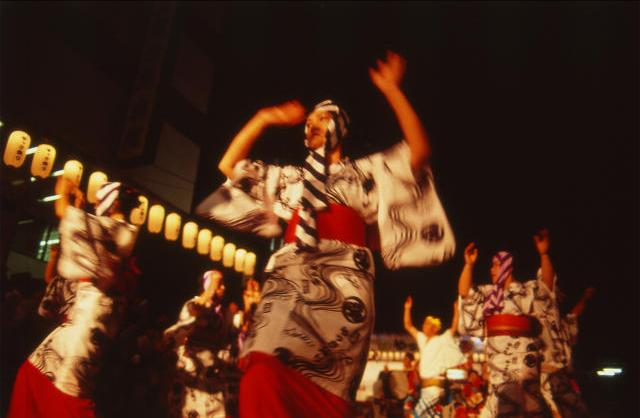
Yassa Festival in August

=== Castles ===
- Mihara Castle, National Historic Site
- Niitakayama Castle - A castle ruin, one of the Continued Top 100 Japanese Castles.
- Takayama Castle

=== Temples ===
- Buttsū-ji – Chūgoku 33 Kannon Pilgrimage #12
- Daizen-ji

=== Shrines ===
- Mitsugi-hachimangu

=== Festivals ===
- Mihara Shinmeiichi Festival
- Mihara Yassa Matsuri
- Satsuki Matsuri

== Notable people from Mihara ==
=== Historical ===
- Kobayakawa Takakage
- Fukushima Masanori
- Lady Kasuga
- Inaba Masanari

=== Modern ===
- Keiko Ikeda, former Japanese gymnast and Bronze medalist of 1964 Summer Olympics in Tokyo
- Ryuji Imada, professional golfer
- Yoshihisa Ishida (石田義久), shot putter
- Masatoshi Kawahara, manga artist
- Leyona, singer and songwriter
- Choji Murata (村田兆治), baseball player
- Hisatoshi Shintaku, long-distance runner
- Toshiko Shirasu-Aihara, former Japanese gymnast and Bronze medalist of 1964 Summer Olympics in Tokyo
- Satoshi Urushihara, manga artist

== In popular culture ==
A small island off the coast of Sagishima, called Sukune, was the location of Kaneto Shindo's film The Naked Island released in 1960. Director Shindo and his wife Nobuko Otowa both had their ashes scattered on the island.
