= Buttsū-ji =

Buddhist temple in Mihara, Japan

Buttsū-ji 佛通寺
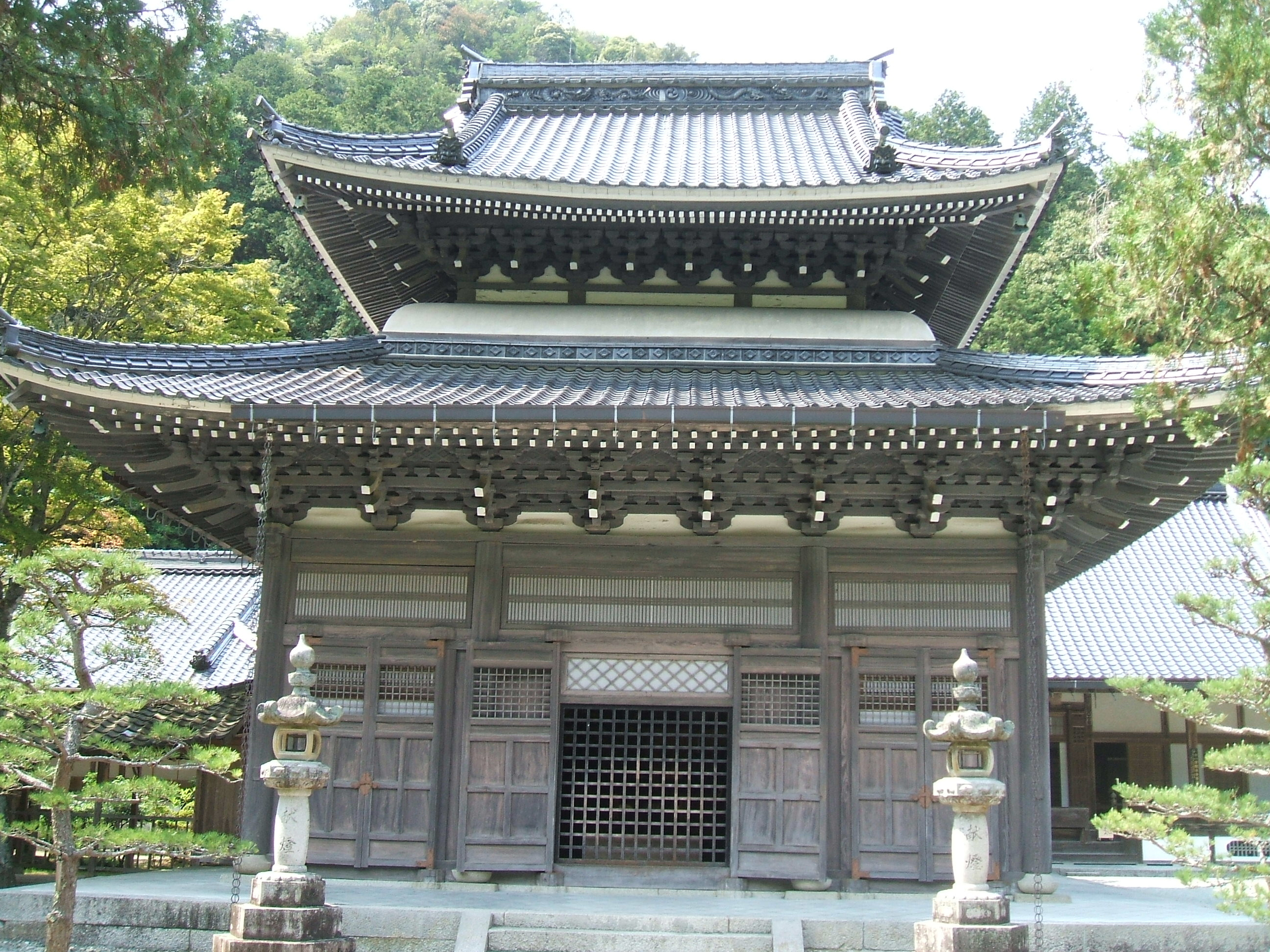
- Main Hall

Religion
- Affiliation: Buttsū-ji Rinzai
- Deity: Shaka Nyorai (Śākyamuni)
- Status: Head Temple

Location
- Location: 22 Motoyama, Takasaka-chō, Mihara, Hiroshima Prefecture
- Country: Japan
- Interactive map of Buttsū-ji 佛通寺
- Coordinates: 34°27′21.1″N 133°1′35.6″E

Architecture
- Founder: Kobayakawa Haruhira and Guchū Shūkyū
- Completed: 1397

Website
- http://www.buttsuji.or.jp/

Buttsū-ji (佛通寺) is a Buddhist temple head one of fourteen autonomous branches of the Rinzai school of Zen Buddhism, founded in 1397 by the lord of Mihara; Kobayakawa Haruhira; its first Abbot was Buttoku Daitsu Zenji. The temple is named after its honorary founder, the Chinese master Buttsu Zenji. Located in Mihara, Hiroshima Prefecture, Japan, the temple is head of the Buttsū-ji branch of Rinzai Zen, governing forty-seven temples.
