= Mitsugi District, Hiroshima =

Mitsugi
- District
- Country: Japan
- Prefecture: Hiroshima

Area
  - Total: 163.55 km^{2} (63.15 sq mi)

Population (2003)
  - Total: 29,682
  - Density: 181.49/km^{2} (470.05/sq mi)

Mitsugi (御調郡, Mitsugi-gun) was a district in Hiroshima Prefecture, Japan.

As of 2003, the district had an estimated population of 29,682 and a density of 181.49 persons per km^{2}. The total area was 163.55 km^{2}.

== Former towns and villages ==
- Kui
- Mitsugi
- Mukaishima

=== Mergers ===
- On March 22, 2005 - the town of Kui, along with the town of Daiwa (from Kamo District), and the town of Hongō (from Toyota District), was merged into the expanded city of Mihara.
- On March 28, 2005 - the towns of Mitsugi and Mukaishima were merged into the expanded city of Onomichi. Mitsugi District was dissolved as a result of this merger.
