= Kōsan-ji =

Buddhist temple in Hiroshima Prefecture, Japan

Kōsan-ji 耕三寺
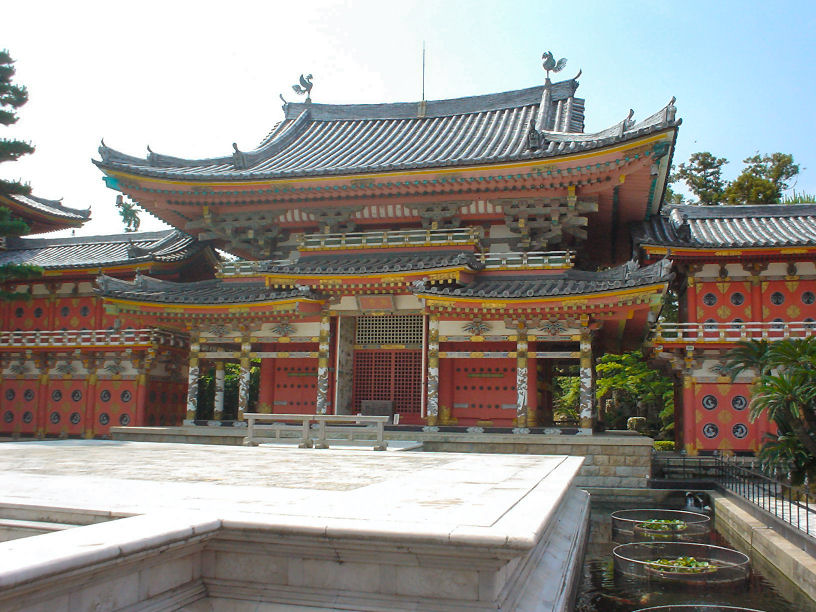

- Location within Japan

Religion
- Affiliation: Jōdo Shinshū Honganji-ha

Location
- Location: 5553-2 Setoda, Setoda-chō, Onomichi, Hiroshima Prefecture
- Country: Japan
- Coordinates: 34°18′13.5″N 133°5′25″E

Architecture
- Founder: Kanamoto Kōzō
- Completed: 1936

Website
- http://www.kousanji.or.jp/english/

Kōsan-ji (耕三寺) is a Hongan-ji school Jōdo Shinshū temple on the island of Ikuchijima in Onomichi, Hiroshima Prefecture, Japan. Founded by the industrialist Kōzō Kanamoto (later Koso Kōsanji) in 1936 in honour of his deceased mother, and with an area of approximately fifty thousand square metres, many of its structures are modelled upon the country's most famous historic temples and shrines. The Hill of Hope (未来心の丘, Miraishin no Oka) is a monument landscaped with five thousand square metres of Carrara marble, weighing some three thousand tons, by Kazuto Kuetani. The Kōsan-ji Museum houses over two thousand items, including nineteen Important Cultural Properties.

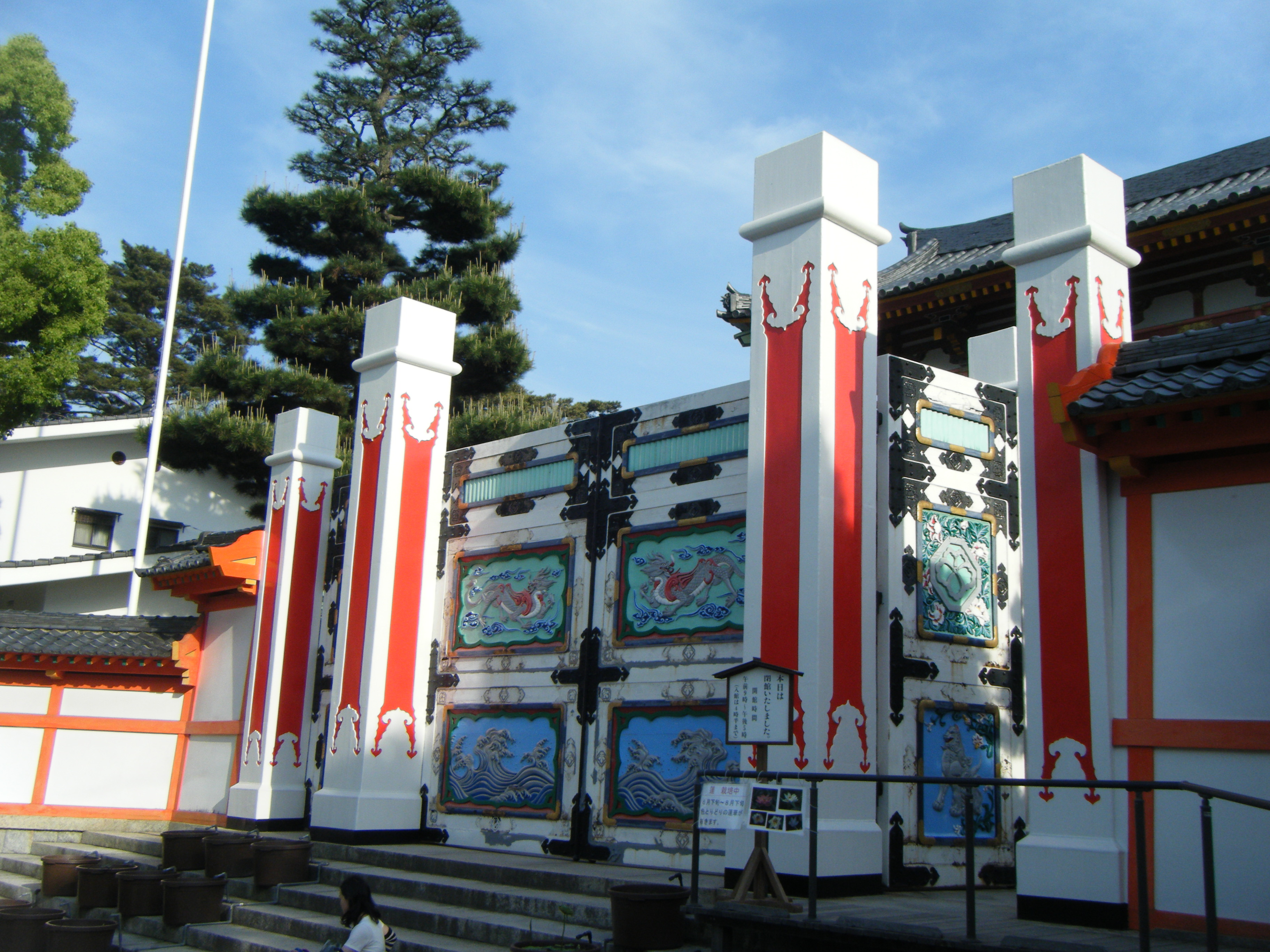

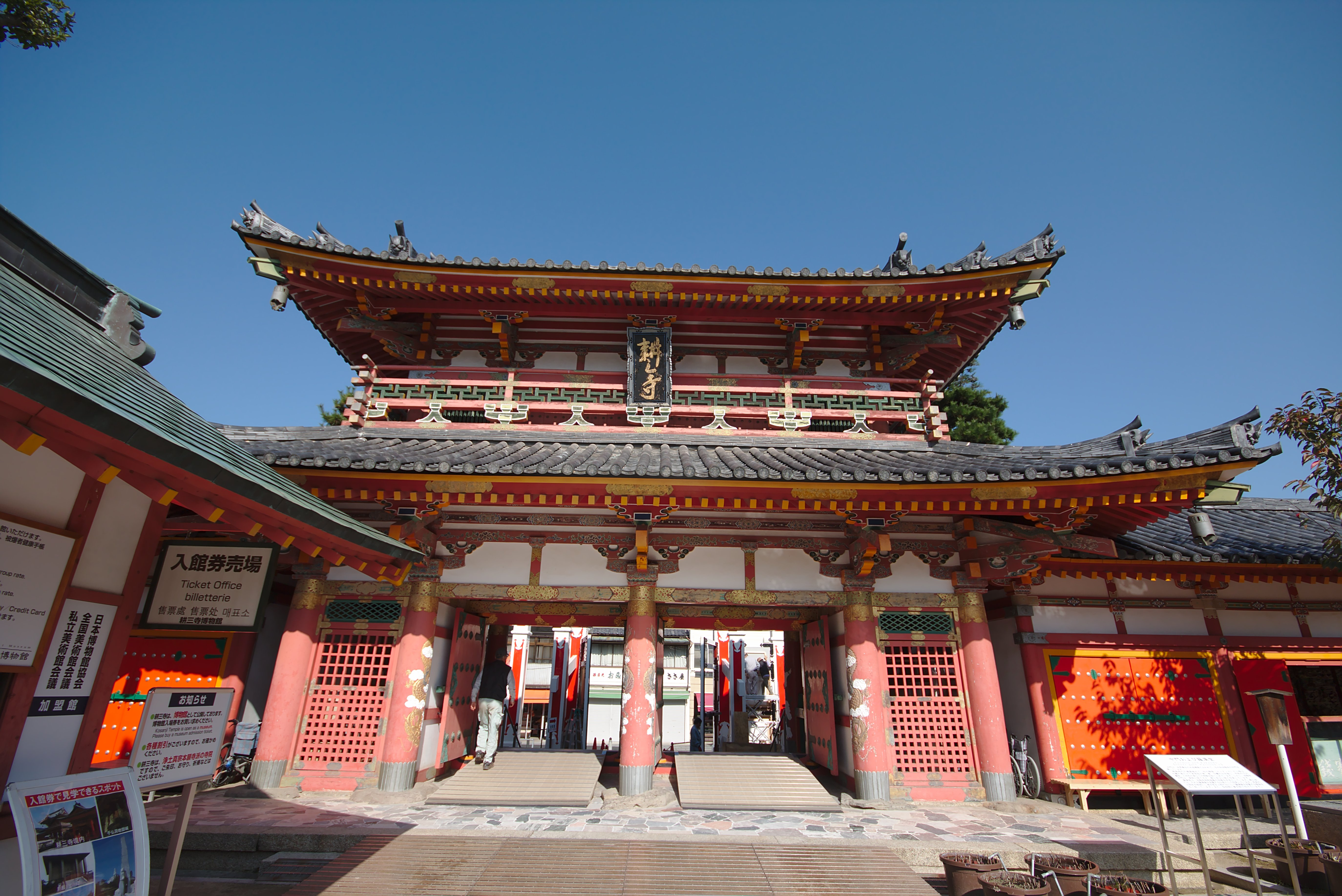

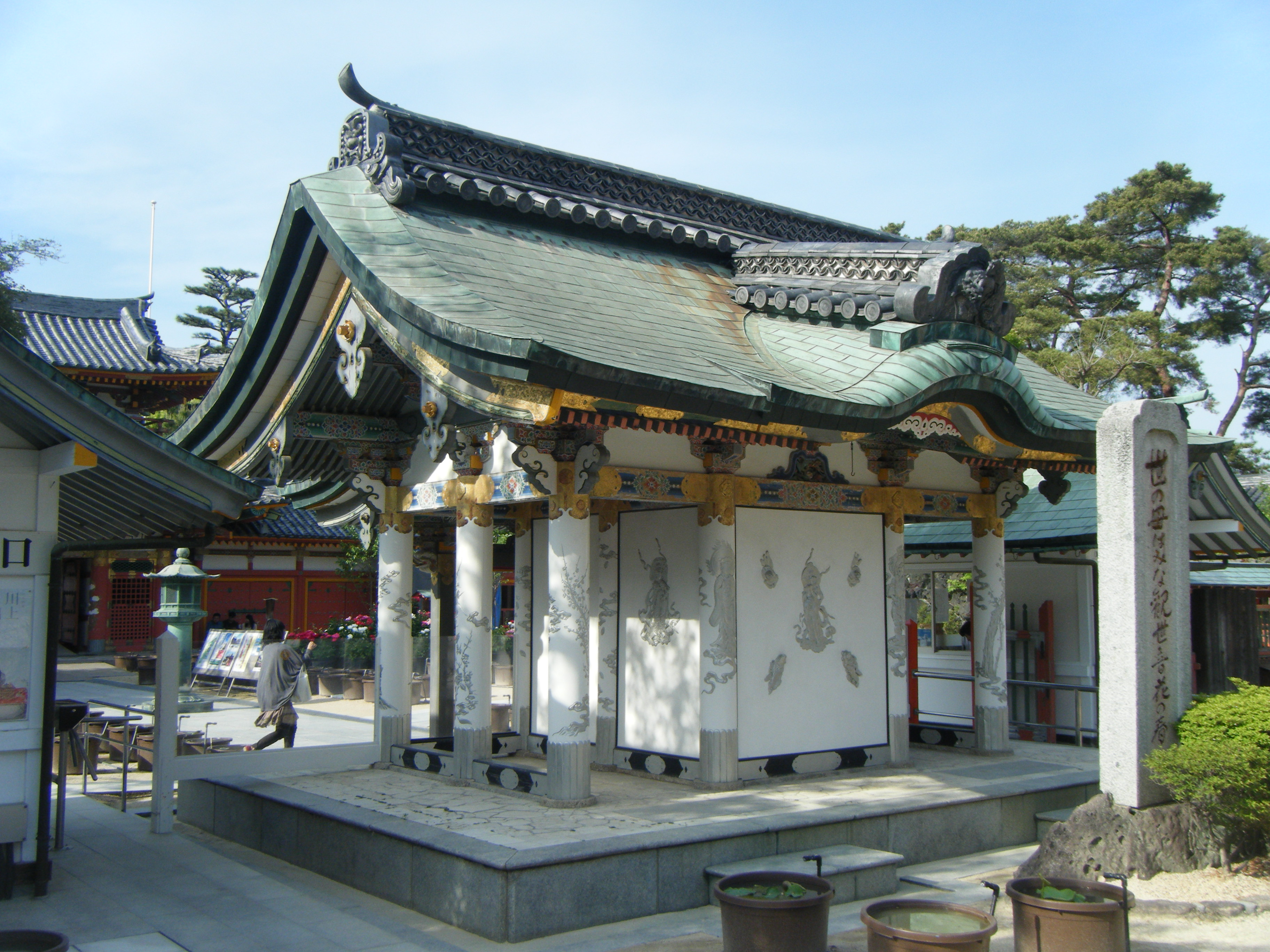

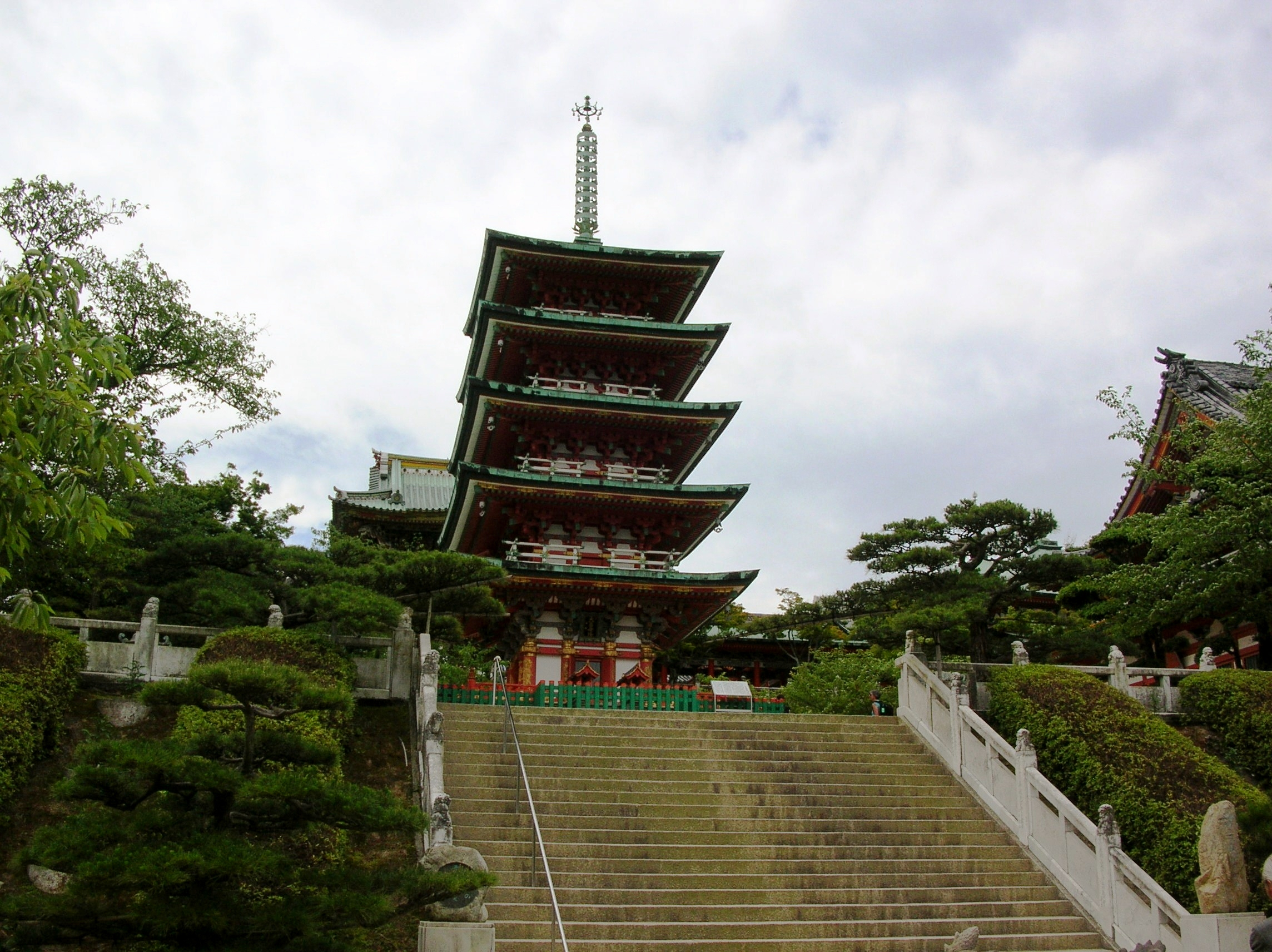

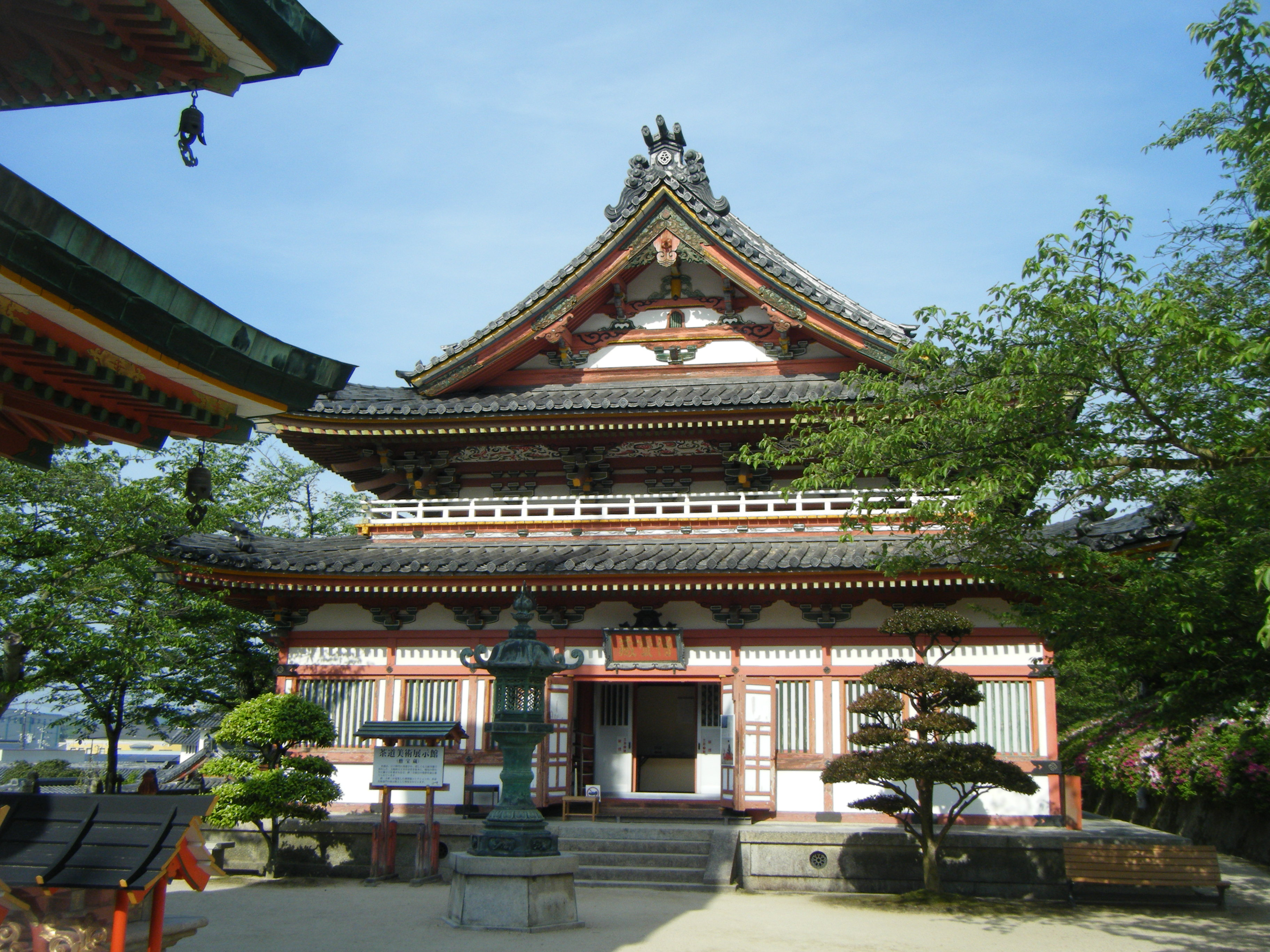

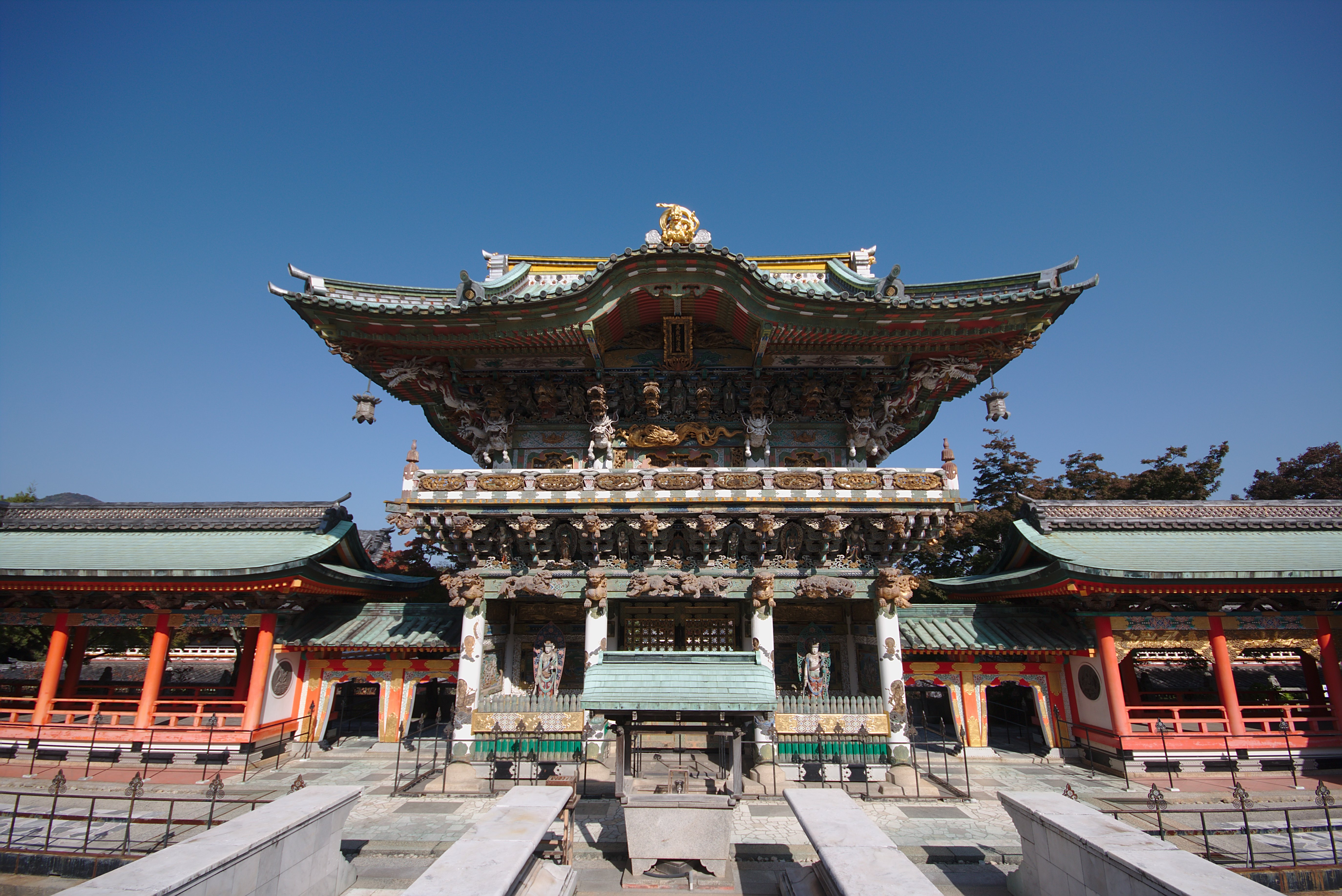

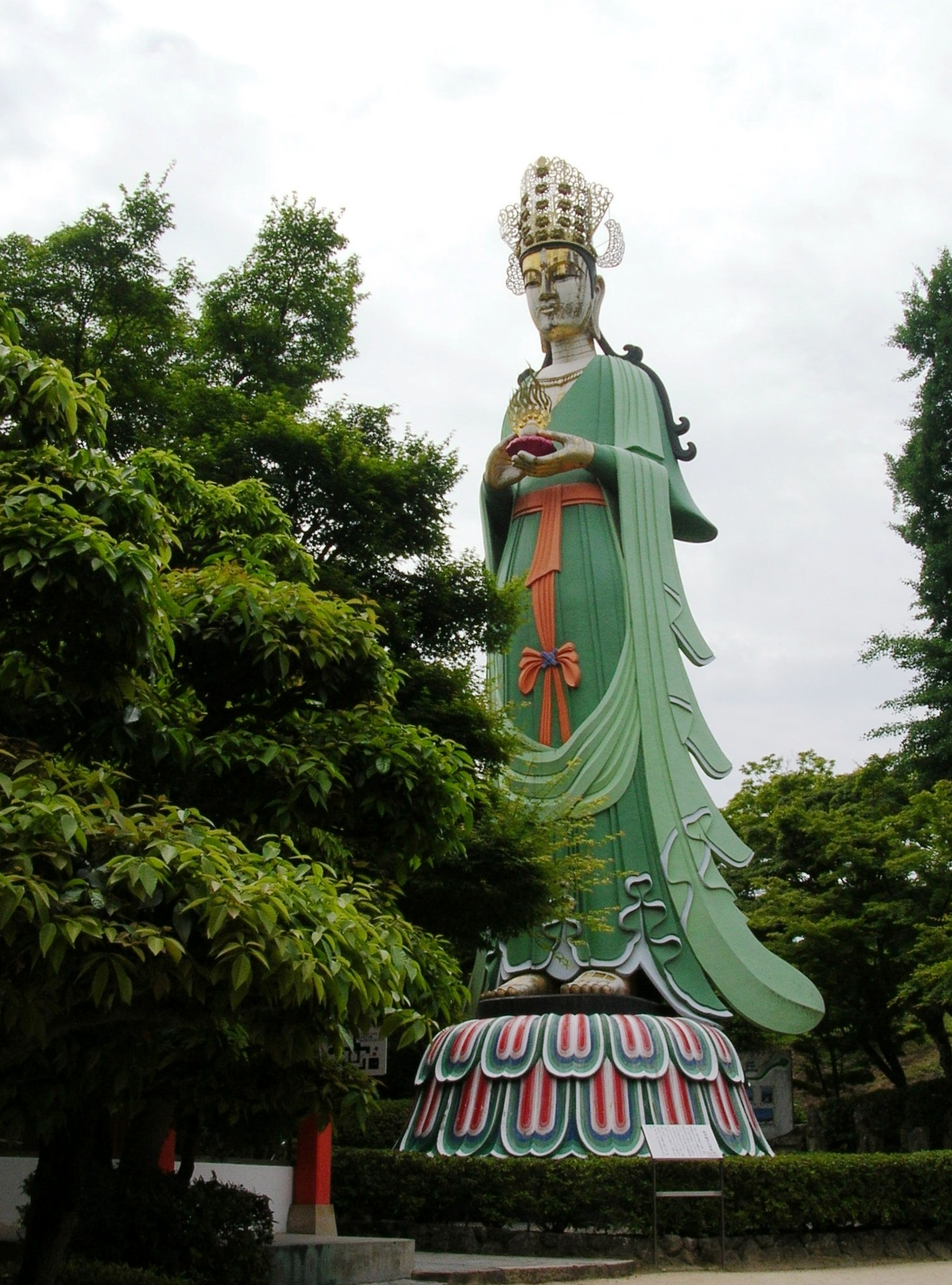

== See also ==
- Jōdo Shinshū
