= Mukaishima, Hiroshima =

Mukaishima 向島町
- Town
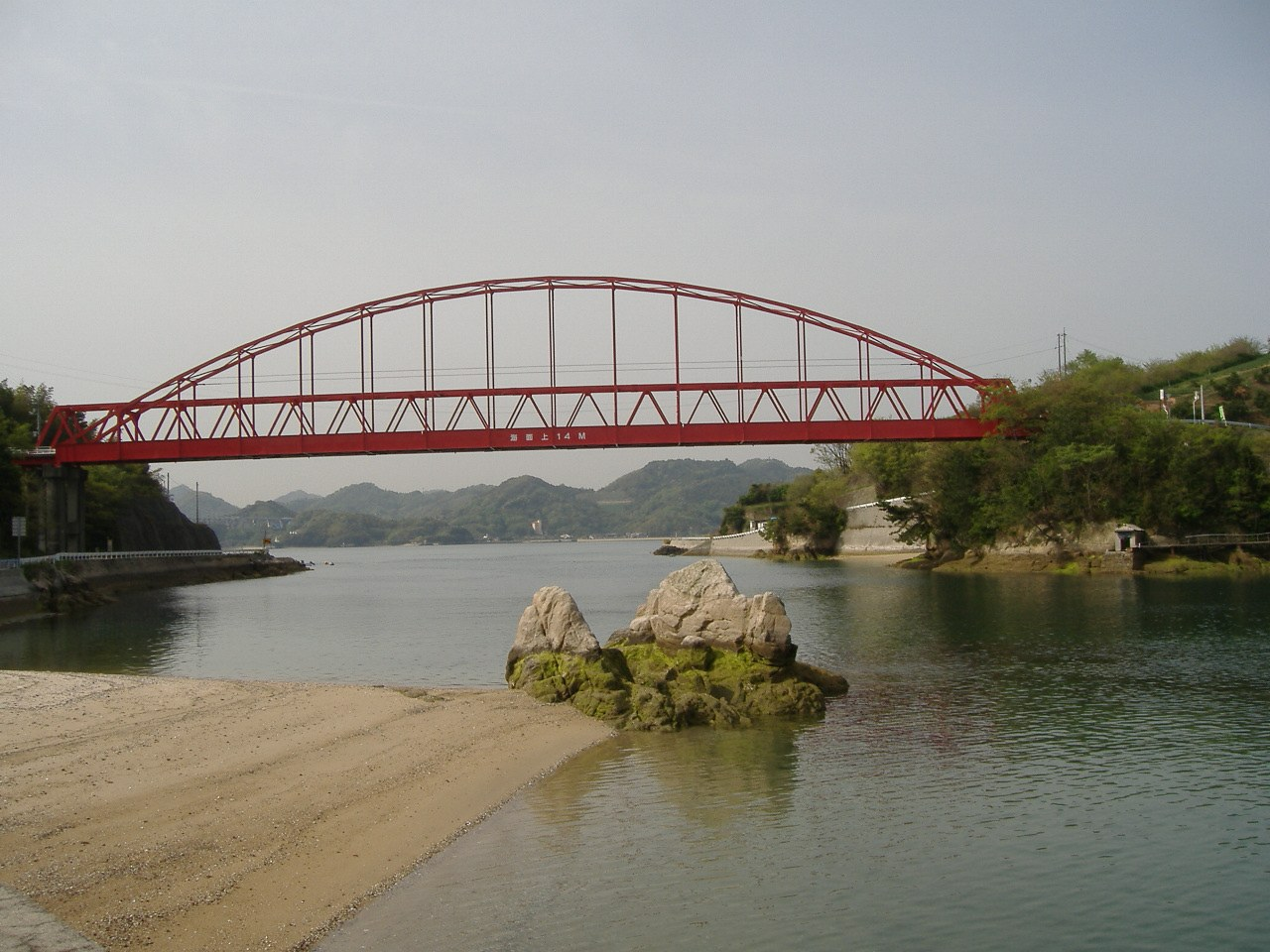

- Flag Emblem
- Interactive map of Mukaishima
- Coordinates: 34.386088°N 133.200866°E
- Country: Japan
- Prefecture: Hiroshima
- District: Mitsugi

Area
  - Total: 18.40 km^{2} (7.10 sq mi)

Population (2003)
  - Total: 16,283
  - Density: 884.9/km^{2} (2,292/sq mi)

Mukaishima (向島町, Mukaishima-chō) was a town in Mitsugi District, Hiroshima Prefecture, Japan.

== Demographics ==
As of 2003, the town had an estimated population of 16,283 and a population density of 884.95 persons per km^{2}. The total area was 18.40 km^{2}, covering the majority of Mukaishima Island.

On March 28, 2005, Mukaishima, along with the town of Mitsugi (also from Mitsugi District), was merged into the expanded city of Onomichi.

== History ==
From November 1942 until September 1945, 100 British POWs who had been brought to Japan on the Dainichi Maru hell ship were imprisoned in Mukaishima and forced to work at the Hitachi Zosen shipyard. Twenty-three of these prisoners died due to a combination of disease, malnutrition and inadequate clothing for the harsh winter conditions.

A further 116 American POWs were imprisoned in the same camp from September 1944 that were brought over from the Philippines on the hell ship Noto Maru.
