= Mitsugi, Hiroshima =

Former town in Hiroshima Prefecture, Japan

Mitsugi (御調町, Mitsugi-chō) was a town located in Mitsugi District, Hiroshima Prefecture, Japan.

As of 2004, the town had an estimated population of 8,144 and the density of 98.14 persons per km^{2}. The total area was 82.98 km^{2}.

On March 28, 2005, Mitsugi, along with the town of Mukaishima (also from Mitsugi District), was merged into the expanded city of Onomichi.

Mitsugi is divided into seven hamlets: Kamikawabe, Ichi, Kawachi, Imatsuno, Ayame, Yamato and Sugano.

Points of interest in the town include:

- The bus station, a roadside station
- The children's library
- The Entsuba Memorial Museum.

The town's special product is dried persimmons.

The town was founded on February 1, 1955.
