= Shinkansen =

Japanese high-speed rail system

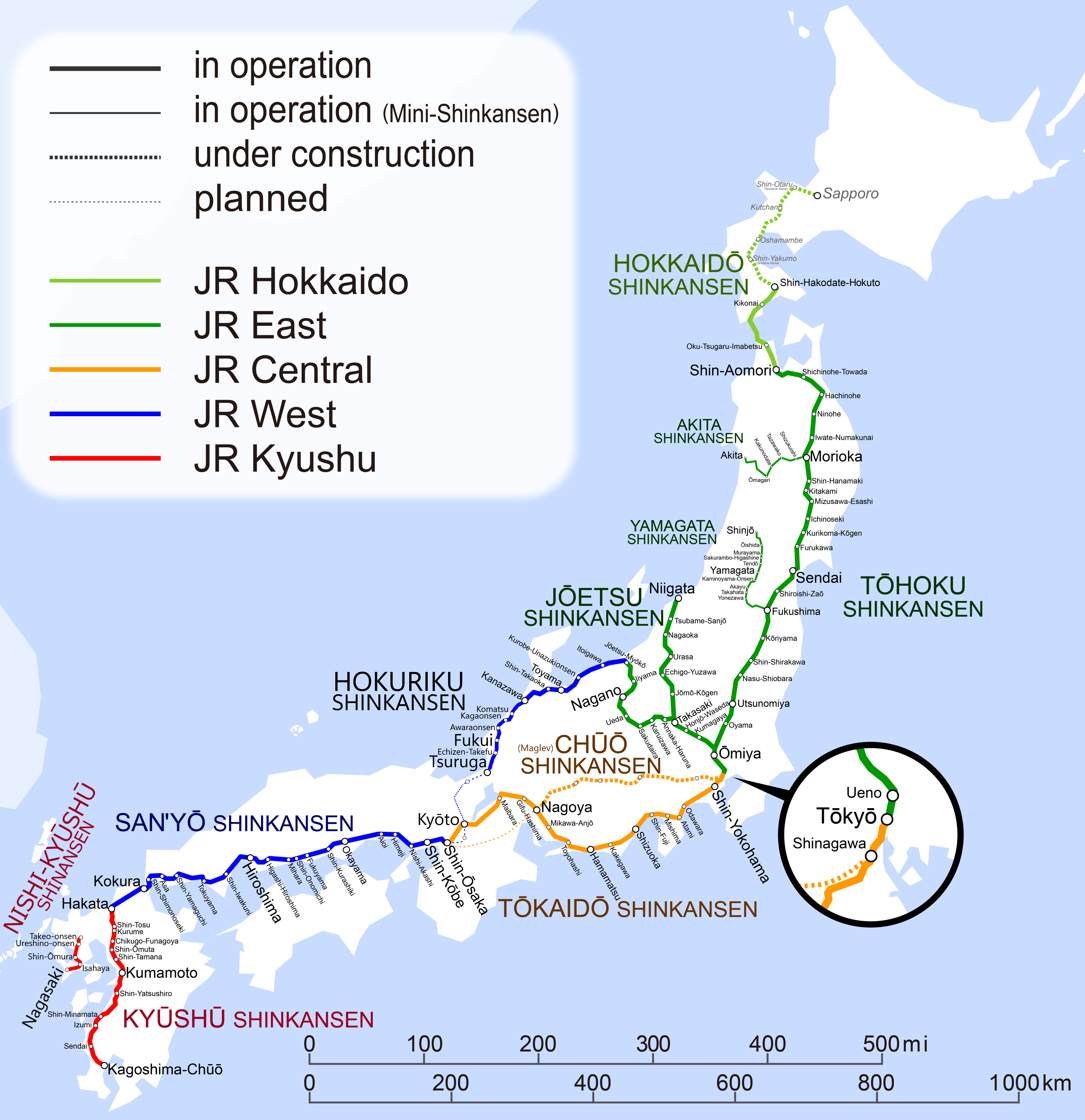
Map of Shinkansen lines, as of May 2024

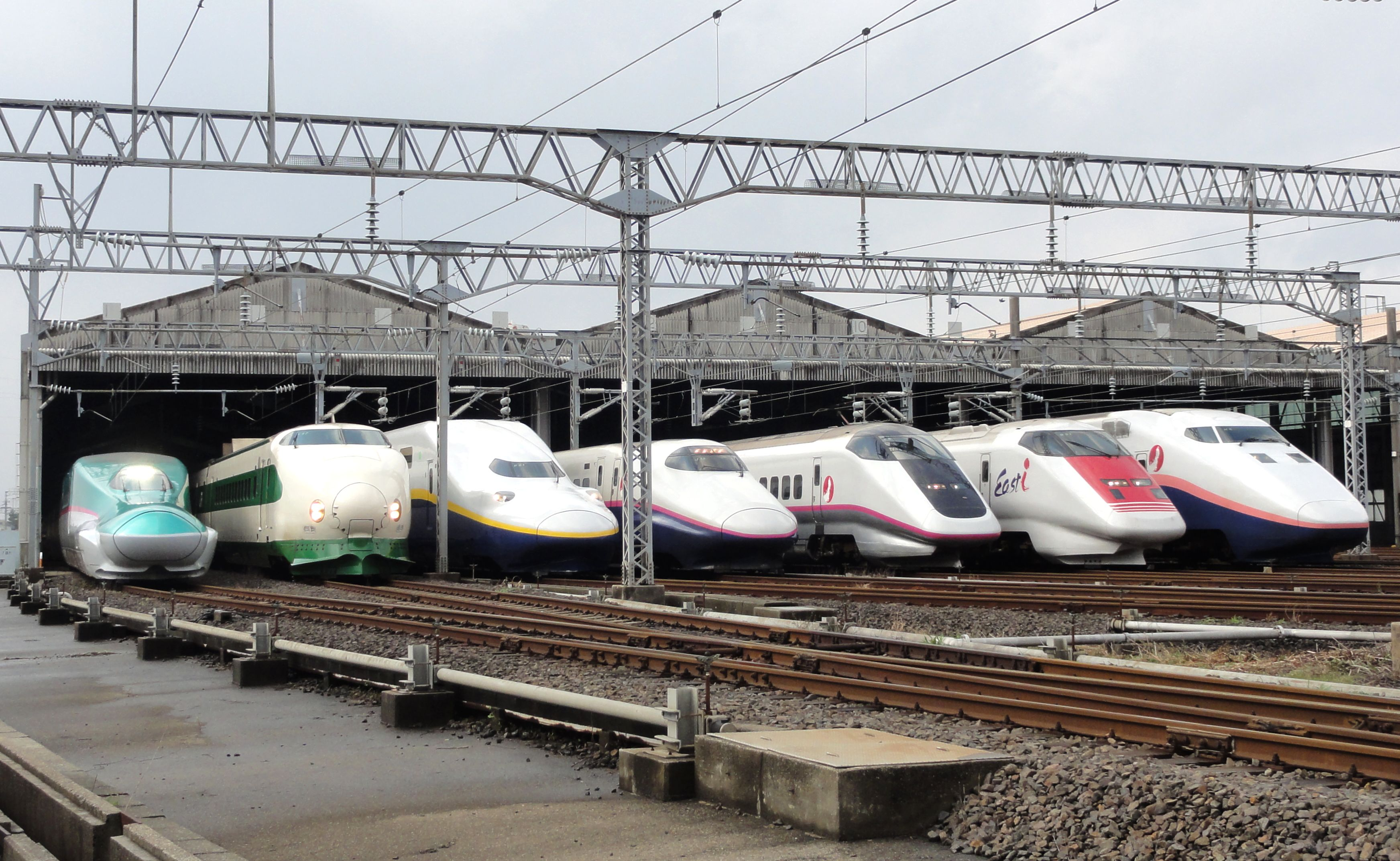
A lineup of JR East Shinkansen trains in October 2012. From left to right: E5, 200, E4, E2, E3, E926 "East i", and E1.

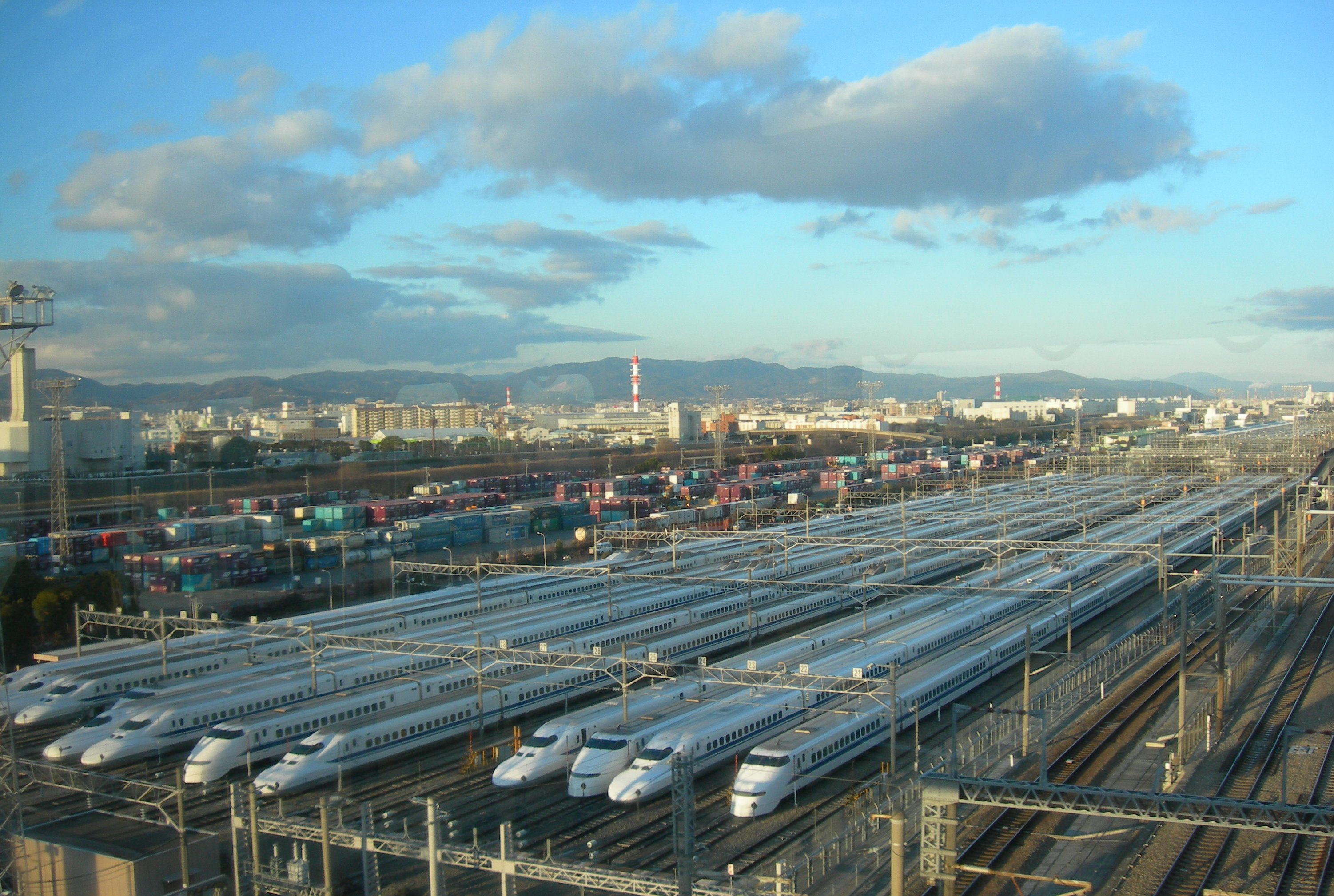
A lineup of JR Central and JR West Shinkansen trains: 300, 700, and N700 series.

The Shinkansen (Japanese: 新幹線; [ɕiŋkaꜜɰ̃seɴ], lit. 'new main line'), colloquially known in English as the bullet train, is a network of primarily high-speed railway lines in Japan. The system was developed to provide connections between Tokyo and other regions of the country. In addition to long-distance services, some sections in and around the largest metropolitan areas are used for commuter travel.

The first line, the Tōkaidō Shinkansen, opened shortly before the 1964 Tokyo Summer Olympics. The 552.6-kilometre (343.4 mi) route connects Tōkyō, Yokohama, Nagoya, and Ōsaka, the four largest cities in Japan. It remains the busiest line in the network, carrying 161 million passengers in fiscal 2023 and more than 6.5 billion passengers in total since opening. During peak periods, up to 16 trains per hour operate in each direction, using 16-car trainsets with a seating capacity of 1,323 and a minimum scheduled headway of three minutes.

Since the opening of the Tōkaidō Shinkansen, the network has expanded to include 2,951.3 kilometres (1,833.9 mi) of lines with maximum operating speeds ranging from 260 to 320 kilometres per hour (160 to 200 mph), the latter achieved on a 387.5-kilometre (240.8 mi) section of the Tōhoku Shinkansen. The network also includes 283.5 kilometres (176.2 mi) of mini-Shinkansen lines with maximum speeds of 130 kilometres per hour (81 mph) and 10.3 kilometres (6.4 mi) of spur lines with Shinkansen services. Shinkansen services operate to most major cities on the islands of Honshu and Kyushu and extend to Hakodate on Hokkaido, with an extension to Sapporo under construction and scheduled to open at the end of fiscal year 2038. In 2024, the Shinkansen network recorded 385.9 million passenger journeys.

The highest speed recorded on the Shinkansen network for conventional rail is 443 km/h (275 mph), achieved by the Class 955 (300X) in 1996, while a speed of 603 km/h (375 mph) was achieved by the L0 Series Maglev in 2015 on the Yamanashi Maglev Test Line (part of the Chūō Shinkansen).

The distinctive geographical conditions of Japan present particular challenges to increasing the operating speed of the Shinkansen. The country is prone to frequent earthquakes, features soft ground conditions and mountainous terrain, includes regions subject to heavy snowfall, and faces spatial constraints in urban areas. Compared with high speed railways in other countries, Shinkansen lines have narrower track spacing between opposing directions, smaller minimum curve radii, and smaller tunnel cross sections, all of which are disadvantageous for higher speeds. The elongated and complex streamlined nose profiles seen in more recent Shinkansen rolling stock, which differ from those of many foreign high speed trains, are designed to mitigate the intense noise resembling an explosive sound generated by compression waves when trains enter tunnels with relatively small cross sections, a phenomenon often referred to as a tunnel boom, thereby ensuring compliance with stringent noise regulations.

Commercial operation at 360 km/h (224 mph), raising the current maximum speed on the Shinkansen network from 320 km/h (199 mph), is planned to begin following the full opening of the Hokkaidō Shinkansen in the late 2030s. In addition, commercial operation by maglev at 505 km/h (314 mph) is planned with the opening of the Chūō Shinkansen between Tokyo and Nagoya.

== Etymology ==
Shinkansen (新幹線) literally means 'new main line' or 'new trunk line' in Japanese. The term is used to refer both to the dedicated high-speed railway infrastructure and to the trains that operate on it.

In English, Shinkansen trains are commonly referred to as the bullet train. This expression is a literal translation of the Japanese nickname dangan ressha (弾丸列車), which dates to 1939 and was originally applied to early high-speed rail proposals during the initial planning stages of the project. The name later became firmly associated with Shinkansen services due to their high operating speeds and the distinctive, bullet-like profile of the original 0 Series Shinkansen trains.

== History ==
=== Background ===
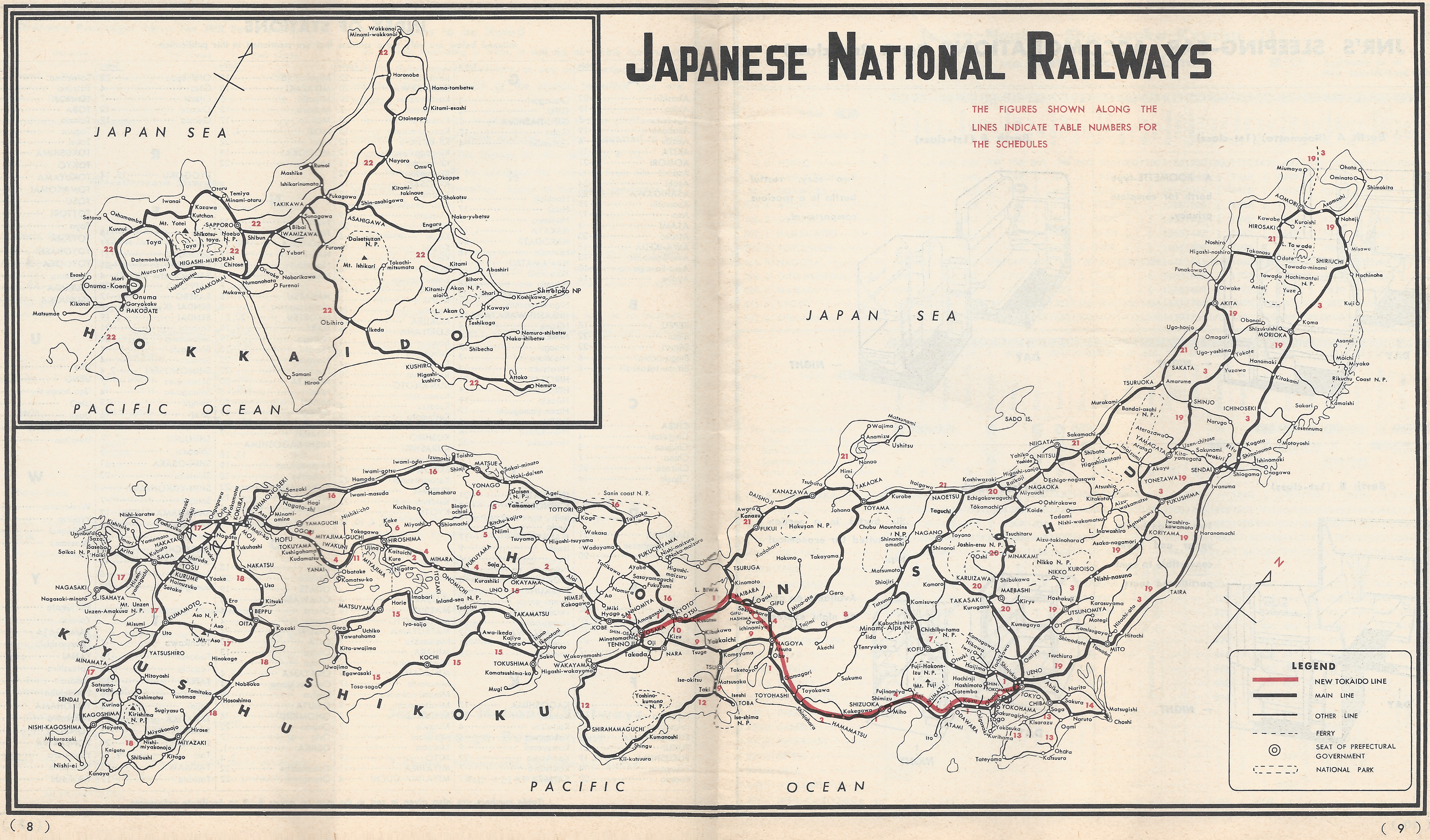
A JNR map from the October 1964 English-language timetable, showing the then-new Tokaido Shinkansen line (in red) and conventional lines

Japan was the first country to construct railway lines dedicated to high-speed travel. Owing to the country's mountainous terrain, the pre-existing rail network was built primarily to a 1,067 mm (3 ft 6 in) narrow-gauge and followed indirect alignments. These lines could not be readily adapted for sustained high-speed operation because of inherent technical limitations, including lower permissible speeds on curves compared with wider gauges. For example, a curve allowing a maximum speed of 145 kilometres per hour (90 mph) on standard-gauge track would typically be limited to around 130 kilometres per hour (81 mph) on narrow-gauge track. As a result, Japan had a greater need to construct entirely new high-speed lines than countries whose existing standard- or broad-gauge networks offered greater potential for incremental upgrades.

=== Early proposal ===
The term Shinkansen was first formally used in 1940, to describe a proposed standard-gauge passenger and freight railway between Tokyo and Shimonoseki. The line was intended to be operated by steam and electric locomotives at speeds of up to 200 kilometres per hour (120 mph). Over the following three years, the Ministry of Railways developed increasingly ambitious plans to extend the route to Beijing—via a proposed tunnel to Korea—and onward to Singapore, forming part of a projected Greater East Asia Railroad serving the Japanese Empire. The network was also envisioned to connect with the Trans-Siberian Railway and other major trunk lines across Asia. These plans were abandoned in 1943 as Japan's strategic position in World War II deteriorated. Nevertheless, limited construction had already begun, and three tunnels built during this period were later incorporated into the present-day Tōkaidō Shinkansen.

=== Construction ===
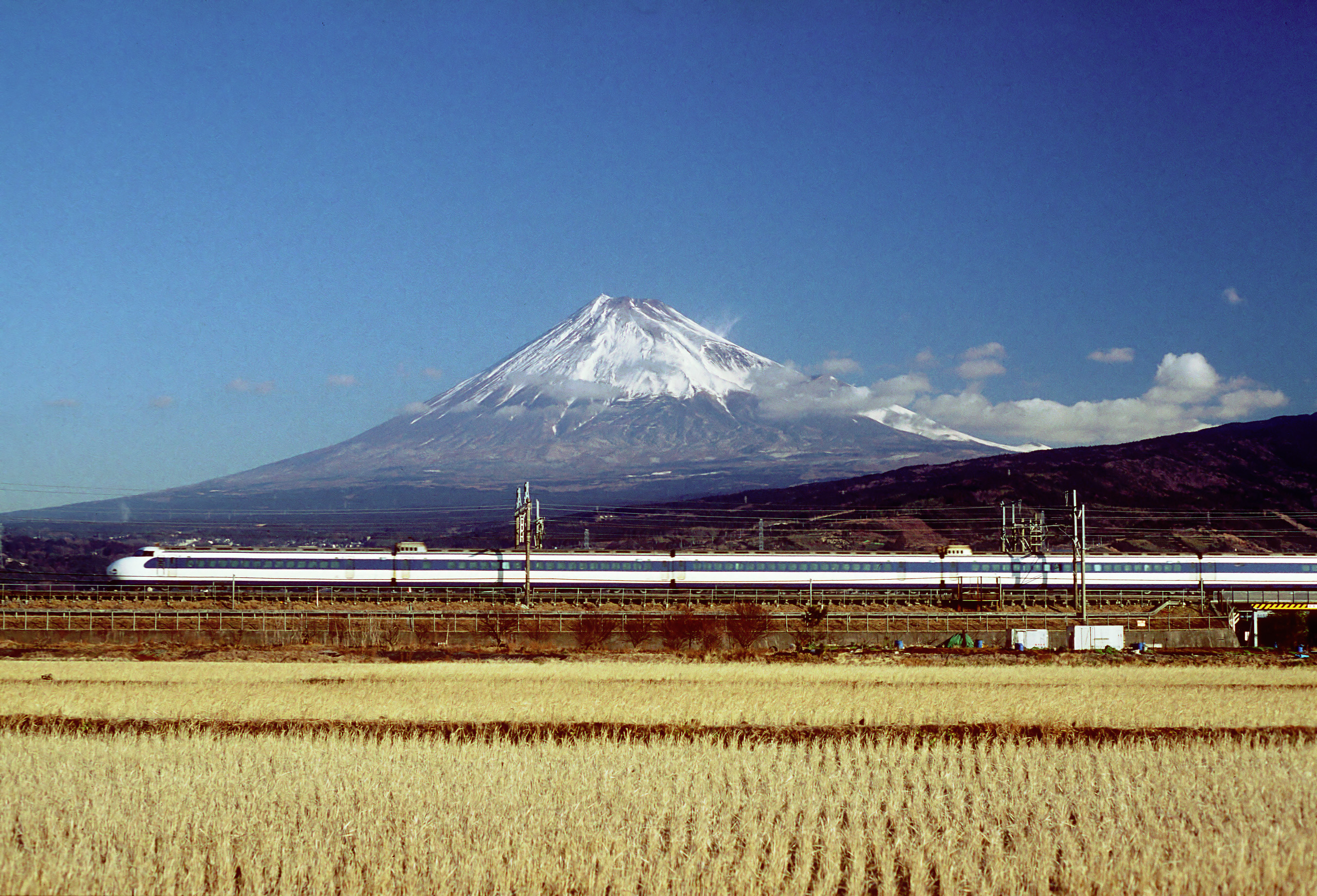
A 0 series set running between Mishima and Shin-Fuji on the Tokaido Shinkansen, with Mount Fuji in the background

Following the end of World War II, high-speed rail was forgotten for several years while traffic of passengers and freight steadily increased on the conventional Tōkaidō Main Line along with the reconstruction of Japanese industry and economy. By the mid-1950s the Tōkaidō Line was operating at full capacity, and the Ministry of Railways decided to revisit the Shinkansen project. In 1957, Odakyu Electric Railway introduced its 3000 series SE Romancecar train, setting a world speed record of 145 km/h (90 mph) for a narrow-gauge train when JNR leased a trainset in order to perform high-speed tests. This train gave designers the confidence that they could safely build an even faster standard-gauge train. Thus the first Shinkansen, the 0 series, was built on the success of the Romancecar.

In the 1950s, prevailing opinion in Japan held that railways would soon become obsolete, following trends in the United States toward air travel and highway construction. In contrast, Shinji Sogō, president of Japanese National Railways (JNR), strongly advocated the viability of high-speed rail and played a decisive role in securing political support for the Shinkansen project. Technical leadership was provided by Hideo Shima, JNR's chief engineer. Other major contributors included Tadanao Miki, Tadashi Matsudaira, and Hajime Kawanabe of the Railway Technical Research Institute (RTRI), then part of JNR. This group was responsible for much of the engineering work on the first Shinkansen line, the Tōkaidō Shinkansen. All three had prior experience in aircraft design during World War II.

Government approval came in December 1958, and construction of the first segment of the Tōkaidō Shinkansen between Tokyo and Osaka started in April 1959. The cost of constructing the Shinkansen was at first estimated at nearly 200 billion yen, (Note: 194,800 million yen)(equivalent to ¥1.239294631884×10^{12} in 2024) which was raised in the form of a government loan, railway bonds and a low-interest loan of US$80 million (equivalent to $883,561,644 in 2025) from the World Bank. Initial estimates, however, were understated and the actual cost was about 380 billion yen. As the budget shortfall became clear in 1963, Sogō resigned to take responsibility.

A test facility for rolling stock, called the Kamonomiya Model Section, opened in Odawara in 1962.

=== Initial success ===
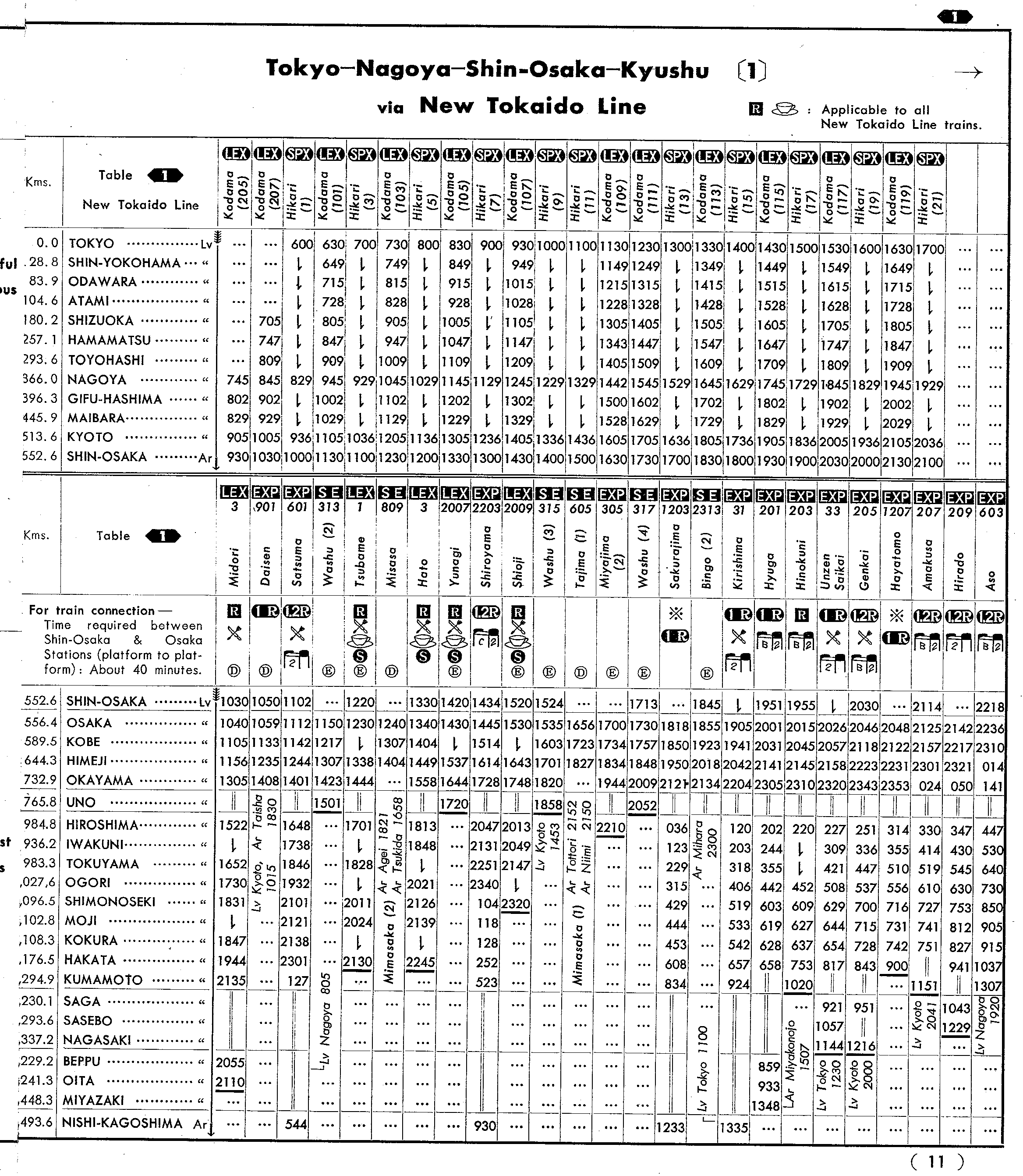
1964 JNR Passenger Timetable showing first Shinkansen services

The Tōkaidō Shinkansen began service on 1 October 1964, shortly before the opening of the 1964 Tokyo Olympics on 10 October 1964. Prior to the introduction of the high-speed line, conventional limited express services required approximately 6 hours and 40 minutes to travel between Tokyo and Osaka. With the opening of the Shinkansen, the limited-stop Hikari service reduced the journey time to four hours, while the all-stations Kodama service completed the trip in five hours. The first Shinkansen trains, the 0 series, ran at speeds of up to 210 km/h (130 mph), later increased to 220 km/h (137 mph), reducing end-to-end trip times on Hikari services to three hours and ten minutes.

The new service enabled same-day travel between Tokyo and Osaka, Japan's two largest metropolitan areas, significantly influencing business practices and daily life while generating substantial new passenger demand.

The line was an immediate success, carrying 100 million passengers within three years, a milestone reached on 13 July 1967, and surpassing one billion passengers in 1976. Sixteen-car trainsets were introduced in time for Expo '70 in Osaka.

By 1992, the Tōkaidō Shinkansen carried an average of approximately 23,000 passengers per hour in each direction, making it the world's busiest high-speed rail line at the time. As of 2014, the line's 50th anniversary year, average daily ridership had increased to about 391,000 passengers, which, over an 18-hour operating day, represented an average of just under 22,000 passengers per hour.

=== Network expansion ===
The Tōkaidō Shinkansen's rapid success prompted an extension westward to Okayama, Hiroshima and Fukuoka (the San'yō Shinkansen), which was completed in 1975. Prime Minister Kakuei Tanaka was an ardent supporter of the Shinkansen, and his government proposed an extensive network paralleling most existing trunk lines. Two new lines, the Tōhoku Shinkansen and Jōetsu Shinkansen, were built following this plan. Many other planned lines were delayed or scrapped entirely as JNR slid into debt throughout the late 1970s, largely because of the high cost of building the Shinkansen network and the effects of the 1973 oil crisis. By 1987, the company was deeply in debt, leading to its privatization.

Video Documentary: Tōkaidō Shinkansen N700 Tokyo to Kyoto

Development of the Shinkansen by the privatized regional JR companies has continued, with new train models developed, each generally with its own distinctive appearance (such as the 500 series introduced by JR West). Since 2014, Shinkansen trains run regularly at speeds up to 320 km/h (200 mph) on the Tōhoku Shinkansen; only the Shanghai maglev train, China Railway High-speed networks, and the Indonesian Jakarta-Bandung High-speed railway have commercial services that operate faster.

Since 1970, development has also been underway for the Chūō Shinkansen, a planned maglev line from Tokyo to Osaka. On 21 April 2015, a seven-car L0 series maglev trainset, planned to be used on the line, set a world speed record of 603 km/h (375 mph). The line is expected to operate at 500 kilometres per hour (310 mph), with the estimated travel time between Tokyo and Osaka taking 67 minutes. Construction commenced in 2011 and was originally scheduled to open in 2027, though it has since been delayed to at least 2034.

== Technology ==
To enable high-speed operation, Shinkansen uses a range of advanced technologies compared with conventional rail, achieving high speed and a high standard of safety.

=== Routing ===
The majority of Shinkansen routes never intersect with slower, narrow-gauge conventional lines. Consequently, the Shinkansen is not affected by slower trains and has the capacity to operate many high-speed trains punctually. Routes are also completely grade separated from road traffic and tracks are strictly off-limits, with penalties against trespassing regulated by law. The routes make extensive use of tunnels and viaducts to go through and over obstacles rather than around them, with a minimum curve radius of 4,000 m (13,123 ft), although the older Tōkaidō Shinkansen line has a minimum of 2,500 m (8,202 ft).

While most Shinkansen routes follow this pattern, two exceptions exist. These are the mini-shinkansen lines, which run on conventional lines converted to standard gauge; and the Hokkaido Shinkansen, which shares trackage with narrow-gauge freight trains through the Seikan Tunnel.

=== Track ===
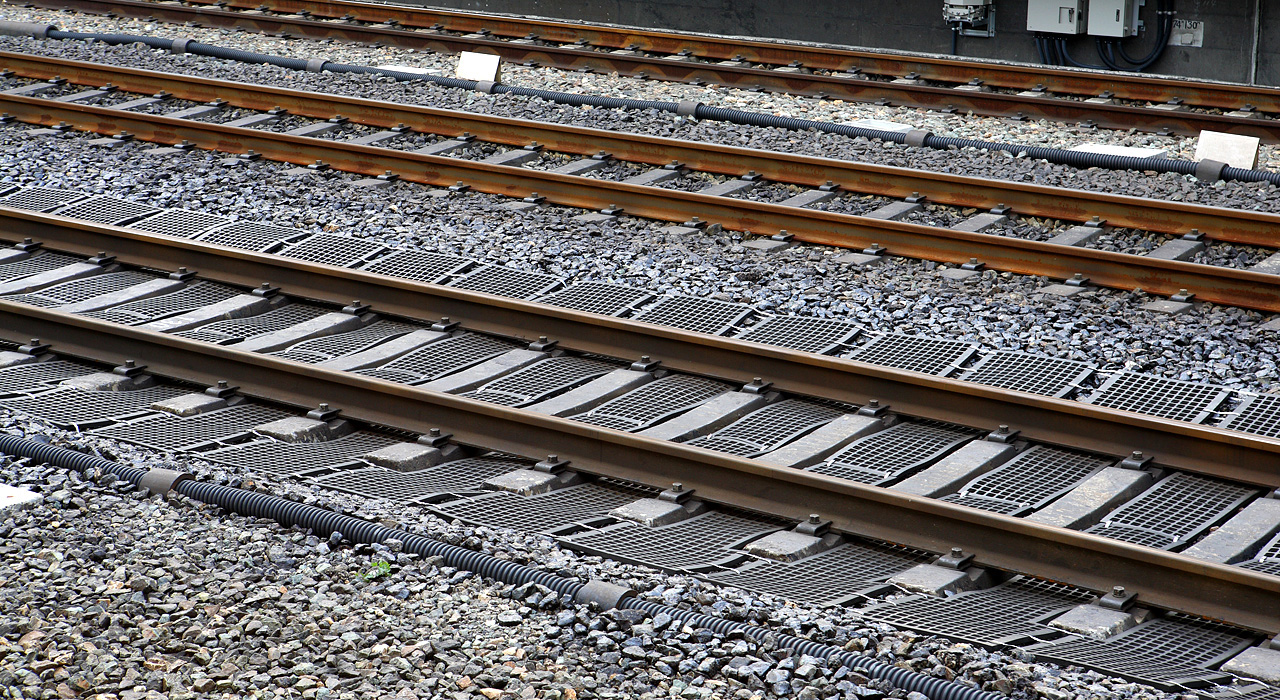
Shinkansen standard-gauge track, with welded rails to reduce vibration

The Shinkansen uses 1,435 mm (4 ft 8 1/2 in) standard gauge in contrast to the 1,067 mm (3 ft 6 in) narrow gauge of most other lines in Japan. Continuous welded rail and swingnose crossing points are employed, eliminating gaps at turnouts and crossings. Long rails are used, joined by expansion joints to minimize gauge fluctuation due to thermal elongation and shrinkage.

A combination of ballasted and slab track is used, with slab track exclusively employed on concrete bed sections such as viaducts and tunnels. Slab track is significantly more cost-effective in tunnel sections, since the lower track height reduces the cross-sectional area of the tunnel, reducing construction costs up to 30%. However, the smaller diameter of Shinkansen tunnels, compared to some other high-speed lines, has resulted in the issue of tunnel boom becoming a concern for residents living close to tunnel portals.

The slab track consists of rails, fasteners and track slabs with a cement asphalt mortar. On the roadbed and in tunnels, circular upstands, measuring 400–520 mm (16–20 inches) in diameter and 200 mm (7.9 inches) high, are located at 5-metre intervals. The prefabricated upstands are made of either reinforced concrete or pre-stressed reinforced concrete; they prevent the track slab from moving latitudinally or longitudinally. One track slab weighs approximately 5 tons and is 2,220–2,340 mm (87–92 inches) wide, 4,900–4,950 mm (193–195 inches) long and 160–200 mm (6.3–7.9 inches) thick.

=== Signal system ===
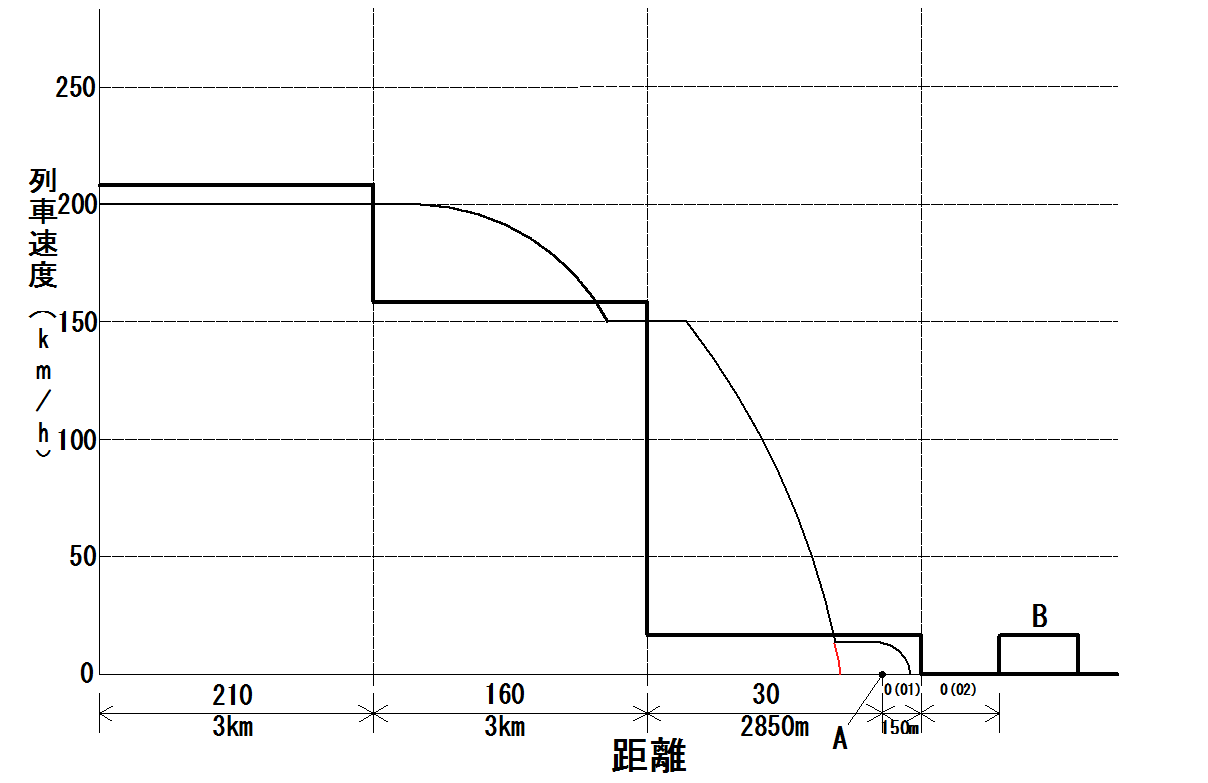
Braking curve for the original ATC-1 used on the Tokaido Shinkansen (Vertical axis represents the speed of the train whereas the horizontal axis represents the distance.)

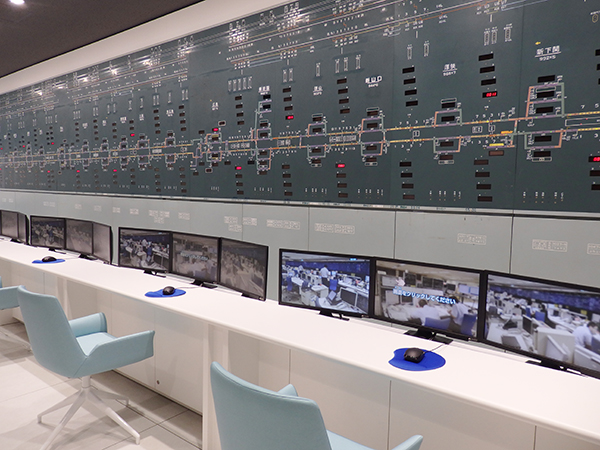
Replica of the Shinkansen CTC as seen at the Kyoto Railway Museum

The Shinkansen employs an ATC (automatic train control) system, eliminating the need for trackside signals. It uses a comprehensive system of automatic train protection. Centralized traffic control manages all train operations, and all tasks relating to train movement, track, station and schedule are networked and computerized.

=== Electrical systems ===
The Shinkansen uses a 25 kV AC overhead power supply (20 kV AC on Mini-shinkansen lines) to overcome the limitations of the 1,500 V direct current used on the existing electrified narrow-gauge system. Power is distributed among the train's axles to reduce the heavy axle loads under single power cars. The AC frequency of the power supply for the Tokaido Shinkansen is 60 Hz.

=== Trains ===
Japanese loading gauge legend. Green: Shinkansen loading gauge Grey: Conventional loading gauge Blue: Rural loading gauge Figures in brackets are former limits.

Shinkansen trains are electric multiple units (EMUs), offering fast acceleration, deceleration and reduced damage to the track because of the use of lighter vehicles compared to locomotives or power cars. The coaches are air-sealed to ensure stable air pressure when entering tunnels at high speed. Shinkansen trains (excluding mini-Shinkansen) are also built to a larger loading gauge compared to conventional-speed rolling stock. This larger loading gauge permits wider coaches, allowing for 5-abreast seating (2+3) in Standard Class coaches, compared to the more common 4-abreast (2+2) seating usually found elsewhere. On occasions, this wider loading gauge was also used to allow 6-abreast seating (3+3) on certain trains, such as the E1 and E4 series sets. This, combined with a lack of power cars, allows for a higher passenger capacity within a shorter train length. However, since mini-Shinkansen lines are effectively track-regauged conventional lines, the conventional loading gauge for 1,067mm lines still applies on mini-Shinkansen lines.

Shinkansen N700A Series

=== Traction ===
The Shinkansen has used EMUs from the outset, with the 0 Series Shinkansen having all axles powered. Other railway manufacturers were traditionally reluctant or unable to use distributed traction configurations (Talgo, the German ICE 2 and the French (and subsequently South Korean) TGV (and KTX-I and KTX-Sancheon) use the locomotive (also known as power car) configuration with the Renfe Class 102 and continues with it for the Talgo AVRIL because it is not possible to use powered bogies as part of Talgo's bogie design, which uses a modified Jacobs bogie with a single axle instead of two and allows the wheels to rotate independently of each other; on the ICE 2, TGV and KTX it is because it easily allows for a high ride quality and less electrical equipment.) In Japan, significant engineering desirability exists for the electric multiple unit configuration. A greater proportion of motored axles permits higher acceleration, so the Shinkansen does not lose as much time if stopping frequently. Shinkansen lines have more stops in proportion to their lengths compared to high-speed lines elsewhere in the world owing to the distribution of major population centers across the country.

== Shinkansen lines ==
=== Current lines ===
The main Shinkansen lines are:

Line		Start	End	Top speed	Length	Operator	Opened	Passengers (2024, thousands)	Passenger km (2024, thousands)
	Tōkaidō	Tōkyō	Shin-Ōsaka (Note: Some trains operate through service to Hakata via San'yō Shinkansen.)	285 km/h (177 mph)	552.6 km (343 mi)	JR Central	1964	170,516	55,407,825
■	San'yō	Shin-Ōsaka (Note: Some trains operate through service to Tōkyō via Tokaido Shinkansen.)	Hakata (Note: Some trains operate through service to Kagoshima-Chūō via Kyushu Shinkansen or Hakataminami via Hakataminami Line.)	300 km/h (186 mph)	553.7 km (344 mi)	JR West	1972	73,856	19,114,179
	Tōhoku	Tōkyō	Shin-Aomori	320 km/h (199 mph)	674.9 km (419 mi)	JR East	1982	87,052	14,989,300
	Jōetsu	Ōmiya (Note: Trains operate through service to Tōkyō via Tōhoku Shinkansen.)	Niigata	275 km/h (171 mph)	269.5 km (167 mi)	JR East	1982	44,053	5,020,645
■	Hokuriku	Takasaki	Tsuruga	260 km/h (162 mph)	470.6 km (292 mi)	JR East; JR West	1997	41,385	5,262,356
	Kyushu	Hakata (Note: Some trains operate through service to Shin-Ōsaka via San'yō Shinkansen.)	Kagoshima-Chūō	260 km/h (162 mph)	256.8 km (160 mi)	JR Kyushu	2004	17,020	2,022,711
	Nishi Kyushu	Takeo-Onsen	Nagasaki	260 km/h (162 mph)	66 km (41 mi)	JR Kyushu	2022	17,020	2,022,711
	Hokkaido	Shin-Aomori	Shin-Hakodate-Hokuto	260 km/h (162 mph)	148.8 km (92 mi)	JR Hokkaido	2016	1,616	246,139

The Tōkaidō, San'yō, and Kyūshū lines form a contiguous west- and southbound corridor from Tōkyō station. Train services operate between the Tōkaidō and San'yō lines and between the San'yō and Kyūshū lines, even though they are operated by different companies.

The Tōkaidō and Tōhoku lines are not physically connected at Tokyo Station, as they use different electrification standards, signaling systems, and earthquake-mitigation devices.

All northbound services from Tōkyō station travel along the Tōhoku line until at least Ōmiya before diverging to other Shinkansen or mini-Shinkansen routes.

==== Mini-Shinkansen ====
Instead of constructing a new right of way, two further lines known as mini-Shinkansen have been constructed by re-gauging existing sections of conventional lines. The mini-Shinkansen trains are coupled to a Tōhoku Shinkansen train between Tokyo and their start station where they couple/decouple on the platform before continuing their journey. While operating on the mini-Shinkansen lines trains have a maximum speed of 130 kilometres per hour (81 mph).

Line	Start	End	Conventional lines used	Top speed	Length	Operator	Opened
Yamagata	Fukushima	Shinjō	Ōu Main	130 km/h (81 mph)	148.6 km (92 mi)	JR East	1992
Akita	Morioka	Akita	Tazawako, Ōu Main	130 km/h (81 mph)	127.3 km (79 mi)	JR East	1997

==== Non-Shinkansen lines operated with Shinkansen equipment ====
There are two standard-gauge lines that are not classified as Shinkansen or mini-Shinkansen lines but are operated with Shinkansen equipment, as they use tracks leading to Shinkansen storage yards:

Line	Start	End	Top speed	Length	Operator	Opened
Hakataminami	Hakata	Hakataminami	120 km/h (75 mph)	8.5 km (5 mi)	JR West	1990
Gala-Yuzawa	Echigo-Yuzawa	Gala-Yuzawa		1.8 km (1 mi)	JR East	1990

=== Lines under construction ===
The following lines are under construction. These lines except Chūō Shinkansen, called Seibi Shinkansen or planned Shinkansen, are the Shinkansen projects designated in the Basic Plan of the Shinkansen Railway decided by the government.

- The Hokkaido Shinkansen from Shin-Hakodate-Hokuto to Sapporo is under construction and scheduled to open by 2038.
- The Chūō Shinkansen (Tokyo–Nagoya–Osaka) is the first maglev Shinkansen line, which has been under construction since 2014. JR Central originally aimed to begin commercial service between Tokyo and Nagoya in 2027. However, in 2024, Central Japan Railway Co President Shunsuke Niwa said that due to construction delays a 2027 opening was now impossible and it is not expected to open until at least 2034.

Line	Start	End	Top speed	Length	Construction began	Expected opening	Operator
Chūō Phase 1	Shinagawa	Nagoya	505 km/h (314 mph)	285.6 km (177 mi)	2014	2034	JR Central
Hokkaido Phase 2	Shin-Hakodate-Hokuto	Sapporo	320 km/h (199 mph)	211.3 km (131 mi)	2012	JFY2038	JR Hokkaido

=== Planned lines ===
- The extension of Hokuriku Shinkansen to Osaka is proposed, with the route via Obama and Kyoto selected by the government on 20 December 2016. Construction is proposed to commence in 2030, and take 15 years.
- The Nishi Kyushu Shinkansen has been built to full Shinkansen standards between Takeo-Onsen and Nagasaki while the existing narrow-gauge line from Shin-Tosu to Takeo Onsen remains as narrow-gauge track. However, there is a proposal to build the section between Shin-Tosu and Takeo Onsen to full Shinkansen standards. In 2018, the Ministry of Land, Infrastructure, Transport and Tourism released cost-benefit analysis results to compare and contrast full Shinkansen, mini-shinkansen, and Gauge Change Trains for this section.

Line	Start	End	Top speed	Length	Construction proposed	Expected opening
Chūō Phase 2	Nagoya	Shin-Ōsaka	505 km/h (314 mph)	152.4 km (95 mi)	TBA	2037
Hokuriku Phase 4	Tsuruga	Shin-Ōsaka	260 km/h (162 mph)	TBA	2030	JFY2045
Nishi Kyushu Phase 2	Takeo-Onsen	Shin-Tosu	260 km/h (162 mph)	TBA	TBA	TBA

=== Proposed lines ===
Map of proposed Shinkansen lines

Many Shinkansen lines were proposed during the boom of the early 1970s but have yet to be constructed and have subsequently been shelved indefinitely.

- Hokkaido Shinkansen northern extension: Sapporo–Asahikawa
- Hokkaido South Loop Shinkansen (北海道南回り新幹線, Hokkaidō Minami-mawari Shinkansen): Oshamanbe–Muroran–Sapporo
- Uetsu Shinkansen (羽越新幹線): Toyama–Niigata–Aomori
  - Toyama–Jōetsu-Myōkō exists as part of the Hokuriku Shinkansen, and Nagaoka–Niigata exists as part of the Jōetsu Shinkansen, with provisions for the Uetsu Shinkansen at Nagaoka.
- Ōu Shinkansen (奥羽新幹線): Fukushima–Yamagata–Akita
  - Fukushima–Shinjō and Ōmagari–Akita exist as the Yamagata Shinkansen and Akita Shinkansen, respectively, but as "Mini-shinkansen" upgrades of existing track, they do not meet the requirements of the Basic Plan.
- Hokuriku-Chūkyō Shinkansen (北陸・中京新幹線): Nagoya–Tsuruga
- Sanin Shinkansen (山陰新幹線): Osaka–Tottori–Matsue–Shimonoseki
- Trans-Chūgoku Shinkansen (中国横断新幹線, Chūgoku Ōdan Shinkansen): Okayama–Matsue
- Shikoku Shinkansen (四国新幹線): Osaka–Tokushima–Takamatsu–Matsuyama–Ōita
- Trans-Shikoku Shinkansen (四国横断新幹線, Shikoku Ōdan Shinkansen): Okayama–Kōchi–Matsuyama
  - There have been some activity regarding the Shikoku and Trans-Shikoku Shinkansen in recent years. In 2016, the Shikoku and Trans-Shikoku Shinkansen were identified as potential future projects in a review of long-term plans for the Shikoku area and funds allocated towards the planning of the route. A profitability study has also been commissioned by the city of Oita in 2018 that found the route to be potentially profitable
- East Kyushu Shinkansen (東九州新幹線, Higashi-Kyushu Shinkansen): Fukuoka–Ōita–Miyazaki–Kagoshima
- Trans-Kyushu Shinkansen (九州横断新幹線, Kyushu Ōdan Shinkansen): Ōita–Kumamoto

In addition, the Basic Plan specified that the Jōetsu Shinkansen should start from Shinjuku, not Tokyo Station, which would have required building an additional 30 km (19 mi) of track between Shinjuku and Ōmiya. While no construction work was ever started, land along the proposed track, including an underground section leading to Shinjuku Station, remains reserved. If capacity on the Tokyo–Ōmiya section proves insufficient at some point, construction of the Shinjuku–Ōmiya link may be reconsidered.

In December 2009, then transport minister Seiji Maehara proposed a bullet train link to Haneda Airport, using an existing spur that connects the Tōkaidō Shinkansen to a train depot. JR Central called the plan "unrealistic" due to tight train schedules on the existing line, but reports said that Maehara wished to continue discussions on the idea. The succeeding minister has not indicated whether this proposal remains supported. While the plan may become more feasible after the opening the Chūō Shinkansen (sometimes referred to as a bypass to the Tokaido Shinkansen) frees up capacity, construction is already underway for other rail improvements between Haneda and Tokyo station expected to be completed prior to the opening of the 2020 Tokyo Olympics, so any potential Shinkansen service would likely offer only marginal benefit. Despite these plans ultimately not being realized (owing in part due to the effects of the COVID-19 pandemic), rail projects in the vicinity of Haneda Airport, including the Haneda Airport Access Line and the Tokyo Rinkai Subway Line, continue to undergo planning.

=== Cancelled lines ===
The Narita Shinkansen project to connect Tokyo to Narita International Airport, initiated in the 1970s but halted in 1983 after landowner protests, has been officially cancelled and removed from the Basic Plan governing Shinkansen construction. Parts of its planned right-of-way were used by the Narita Sky Access Line which opened in 2010, and the Keiyo Line reused space originally set aside for the Narita Shinkansen terminus at Tokyo Station. Although the Sky Access Line uses standard-gauge track, it was not built to Shinkansen specifications and there are no plans to convert it into a full Shinkansen line.

== Services ==
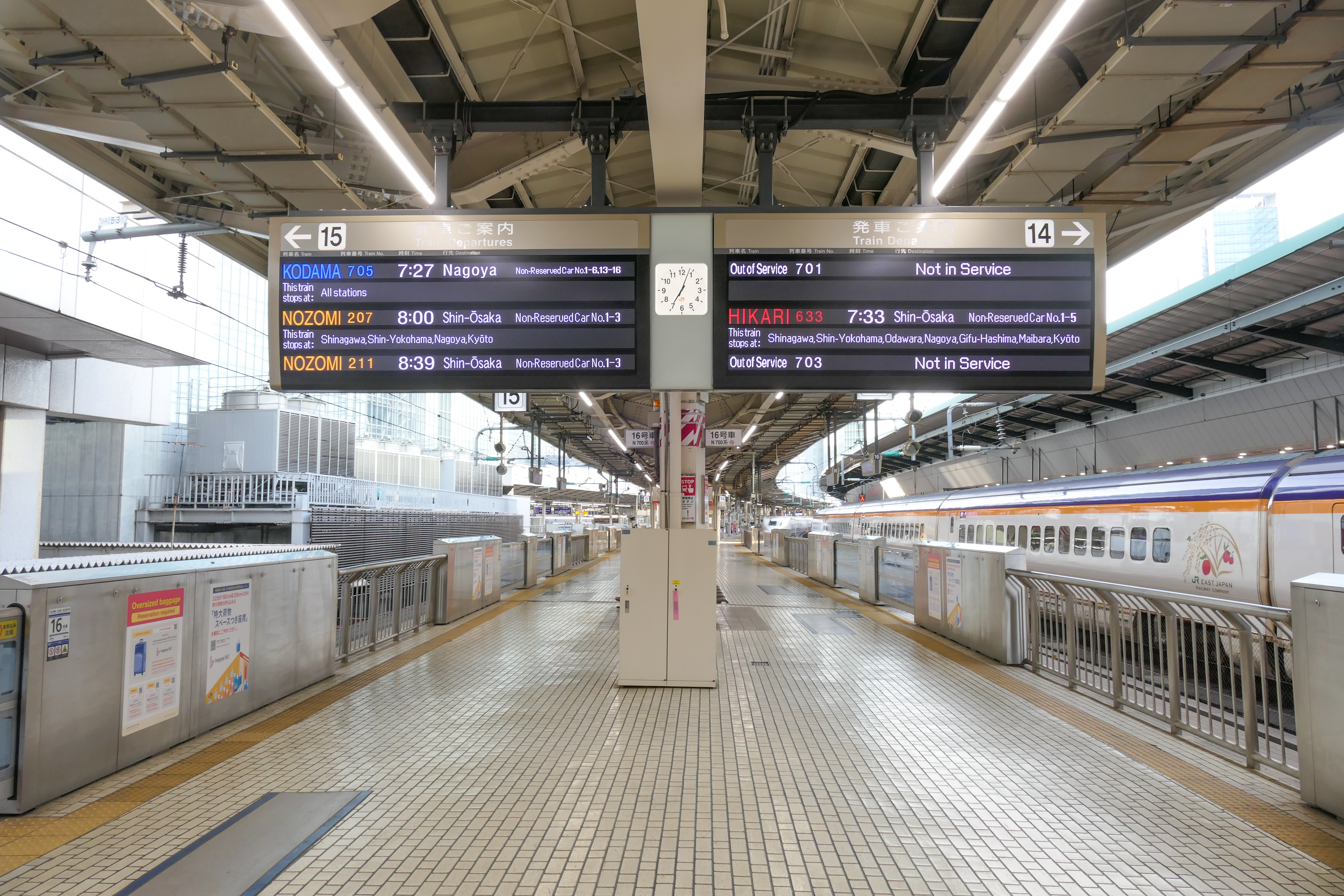
Tokyo Station Tokaido Shinkansen platforms, September 2021

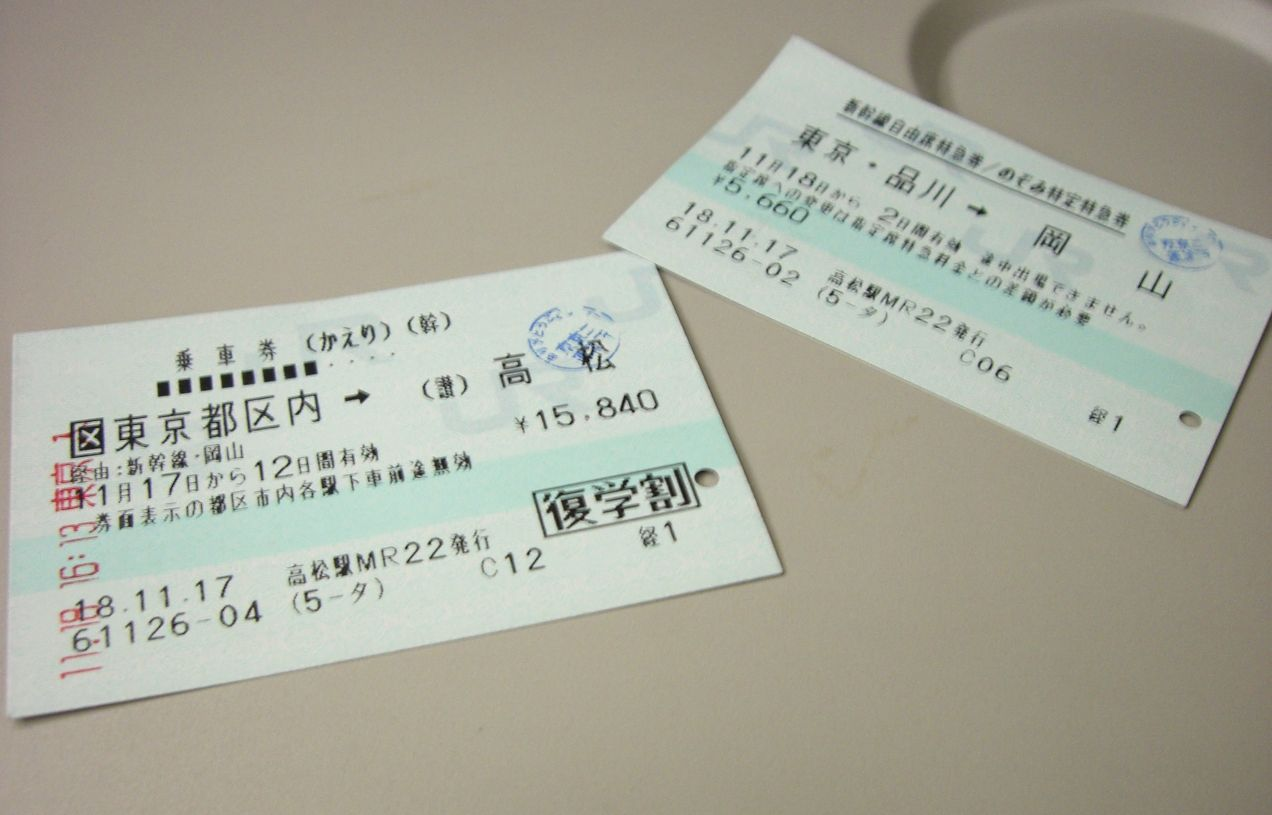
The Shinkansen fare system is integrated with Japan's conventional lines. In this example, a base-fare ticket from Tokyo to Takamatsu is paired with a Shinkansen express surcharge ticket from Tokyo to Okayama, allowing travel by Shinkansen to Okayama and by conventional lines to Takamatsu.

Originally intended to carry passenger trains by day and freight trains by night, the Shinkansen lines carried exclusively passengers for the first five and a half decades of their operation. Light freight has been carried on some passenger services since 2019, and there are plans to expand this with freight-only trains in the future.

The system shuts down between midnight and 06:00 every day for maintenance. Japan's few remaining overnight passenger trains run on the older, narrow-gauge network that the Shinkansen parallels.

There are three principal service types on the Shinkansen:

- Express – stop only at major stations and are the fastest services in terms of average journey time.
- Limited-stop – serve a mix of major stations and selected intermediate stations, providing faster journeys for smaller cities than would be possible using local services.
- Local – stop at every station along the section they operate over, and therefore have the lowest average speeds. These services typically operate over only part of a line rather than end to end.

=== Tōkaidō, San'yō and Kyushu Shinkansen ===
- Nozomi (express, Tokaido and San'yō)
- Hikari (limited-stop, Tokaido and San'yō)
- Hikari Rail Star (limited-stop, San'yō)
- Kodama (local, Tokaido and San'yō)
- Sakura (limited-stop, San'yō and Kyushu)
- Mizuho (express, San'yō and Kyushu)
- Tsubame (local, Kyushu)

=== Tōhoku, Hokkaido, Yamagata and Akita Shinkansen ===
- Hayabusa (express, Tōhoku & Hokkaido)
- Hayate (local, Tōhoku & Hokkaido)
- Yamabiko (limited-stop, Tohoku)
- Nasuno (local, Tohoku)
- Komachi (express, Akita)
- Tsubasa (limited-stop, Yamagata)

=== Jōetsu Shinkansen ===
- Toki (limited-stop)
- Tanigawa (local)

=== Hokuriku Shinkansen ===
- Kagayaki (express)
- Hakutaka (limited-stop)
- Tsurugi (local)
- Asama (local)

=== Nishi Kyushu Shinkansen ===
- Kamome (local)

== Rolling stock ==
Shinkansen trains are up to sixteen cars long, and the longest are over 400 metres (1/4 mi) from end to end. Stations are similarly long to accommodate these trains.

=== Passenger trains ===
==== Tōkaidō and San'yō Shinkansen ====
- 0 series – The first Shinkansen trains which entered service in 1964. Maximum operating speed was 220 km/h (135 mph). More than 3,200 cars were built. Withdrawn in December 2008.
- 100 series – Entered service in 1985, and featured bilevel cars with restaurant car and compartments. Maximum operating speed was 230 km/h (145 mph). Later used only on San'yō Shinkansen Kodama services. Withdrawn in March 2012.
- 300 series – Entered service in 1992, initially on Nozomi services with maximum operating speed of 270 km/h (170 mph). Withdrawn in March 2012.
- 500 series – Introduced on Nozomi services in 1997, with an operating speed of 300 km/h (185 mph). Since 2008, sets have been shortened from 16 to 8 cars for use on San'yō Shinkansen Kodama services with a maximum operating speed of 285 km/h (175 mph).
- 700 series – 8 and 16-car trainsets introduced in 1999, with maximum operating speed of 285 km/h (175 mph). The JR Central owned units were withdrawn in March 2020, with the JR West owned units continuing to operate on the San'yō Shinkansen line between Shin-Osaka and Hakata.
- N700 series – 16-car trainsets introduced in 2007 and 8-car S&R trainsets introduced in 2011, with a maximum operating speed of and 300 km/h (185 mph) for the 8-car S&R sets and 16-car sets.
- N700A series – 16-car trainsets introduced in 2013. An upgraded version of N700 series with improved acceleration/deceleration and quieter traction motors. All N700 series sets have been converted to N700A. In 2025, JR West introduced shortened N700A series trains from 16 to 8 cars to replace the 500 series on the San'yō Shinkansen Kodama service with a maximum operating speed of 285 km/h (177 mph).
- N700S series – 16-car trainsets introduced in 2020. An evolution of the N700A series.
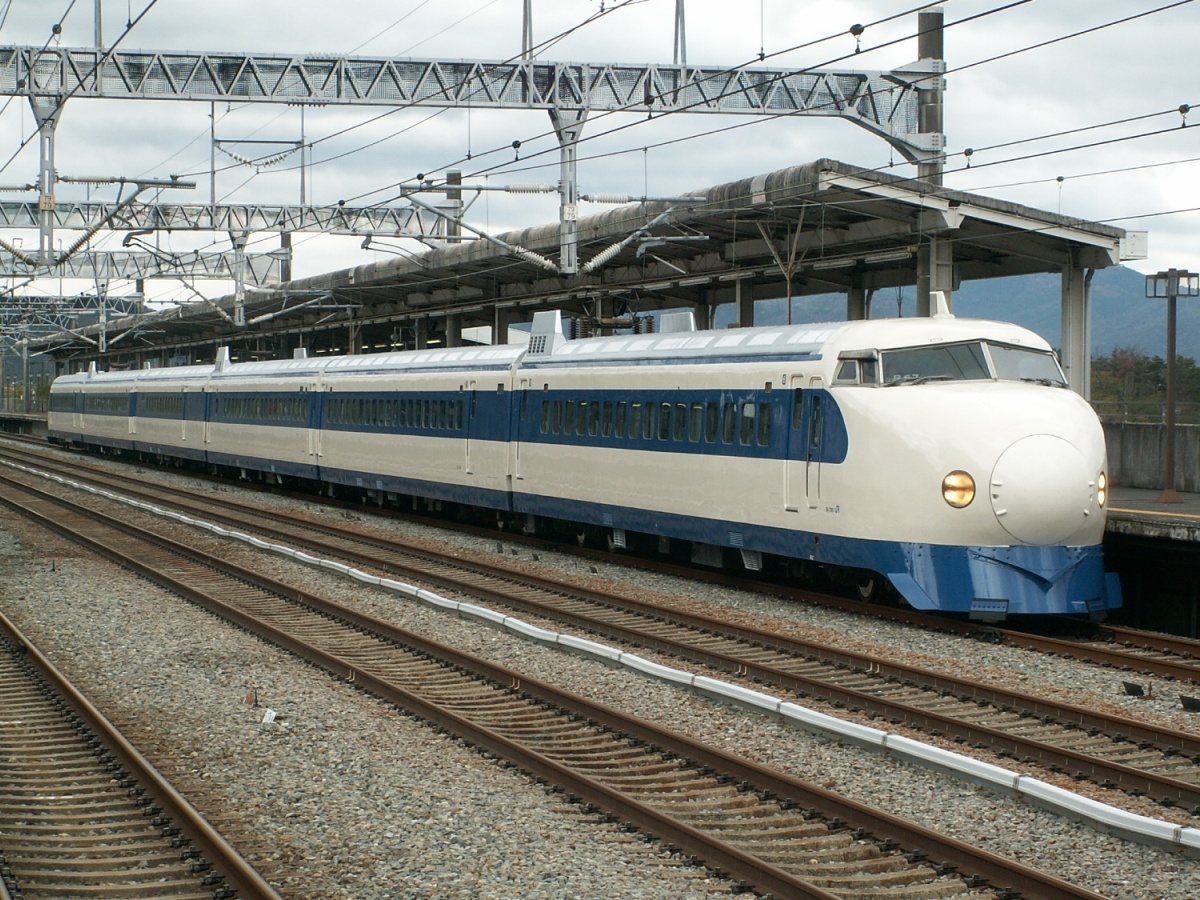
0 series

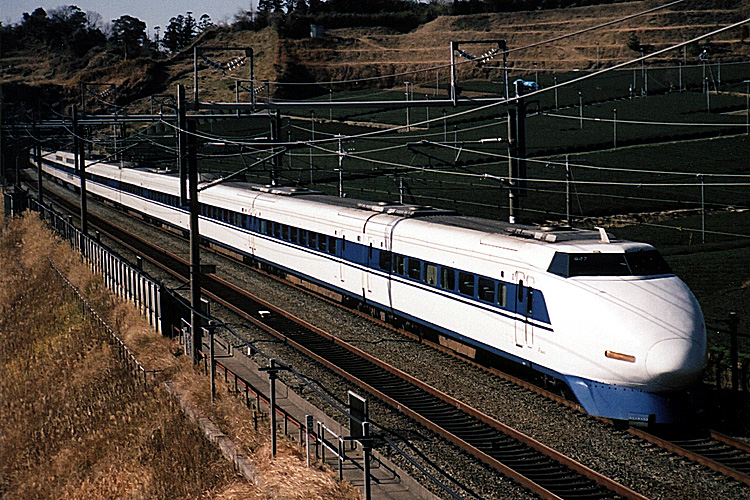
100 series

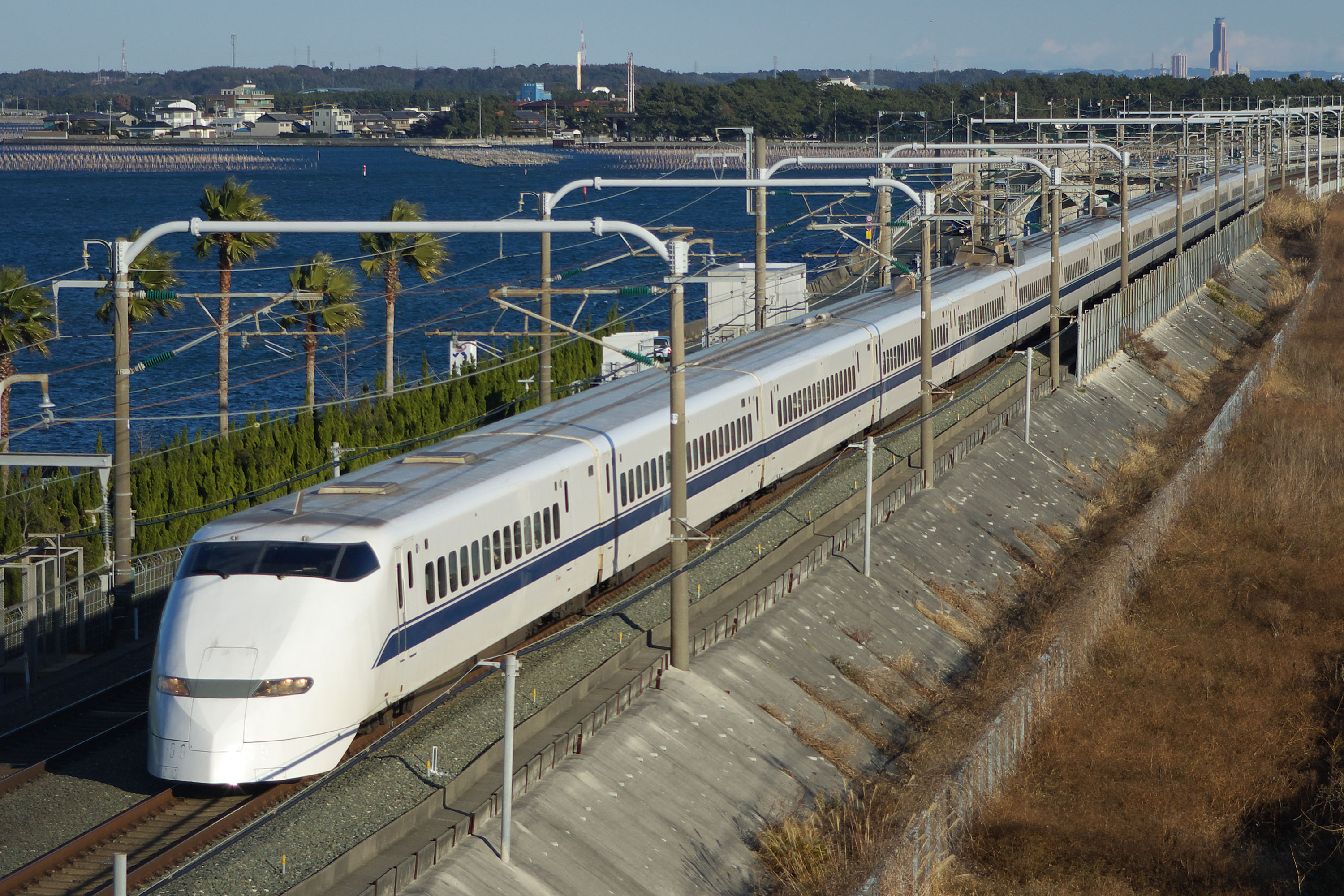
300 series

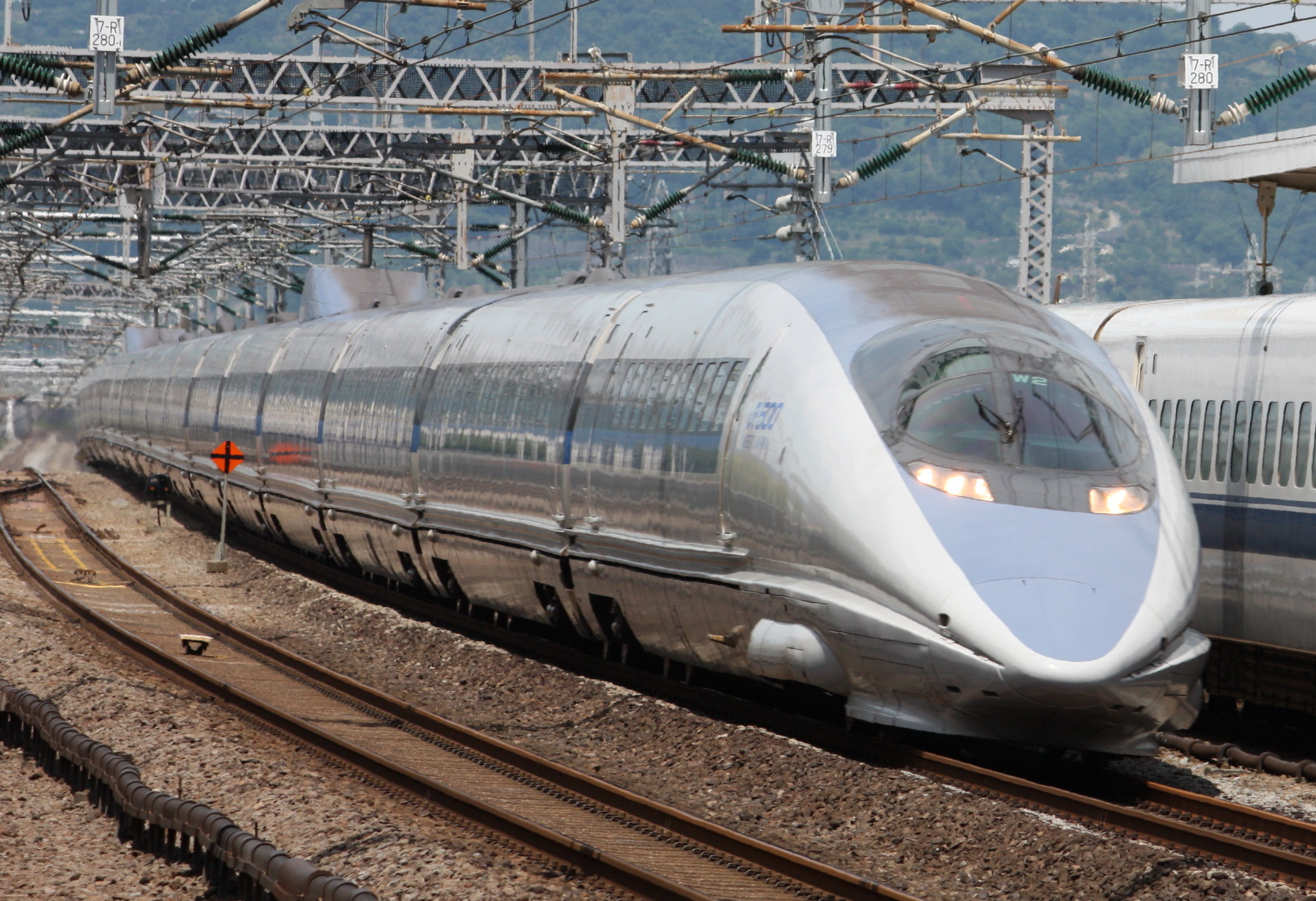
500 series

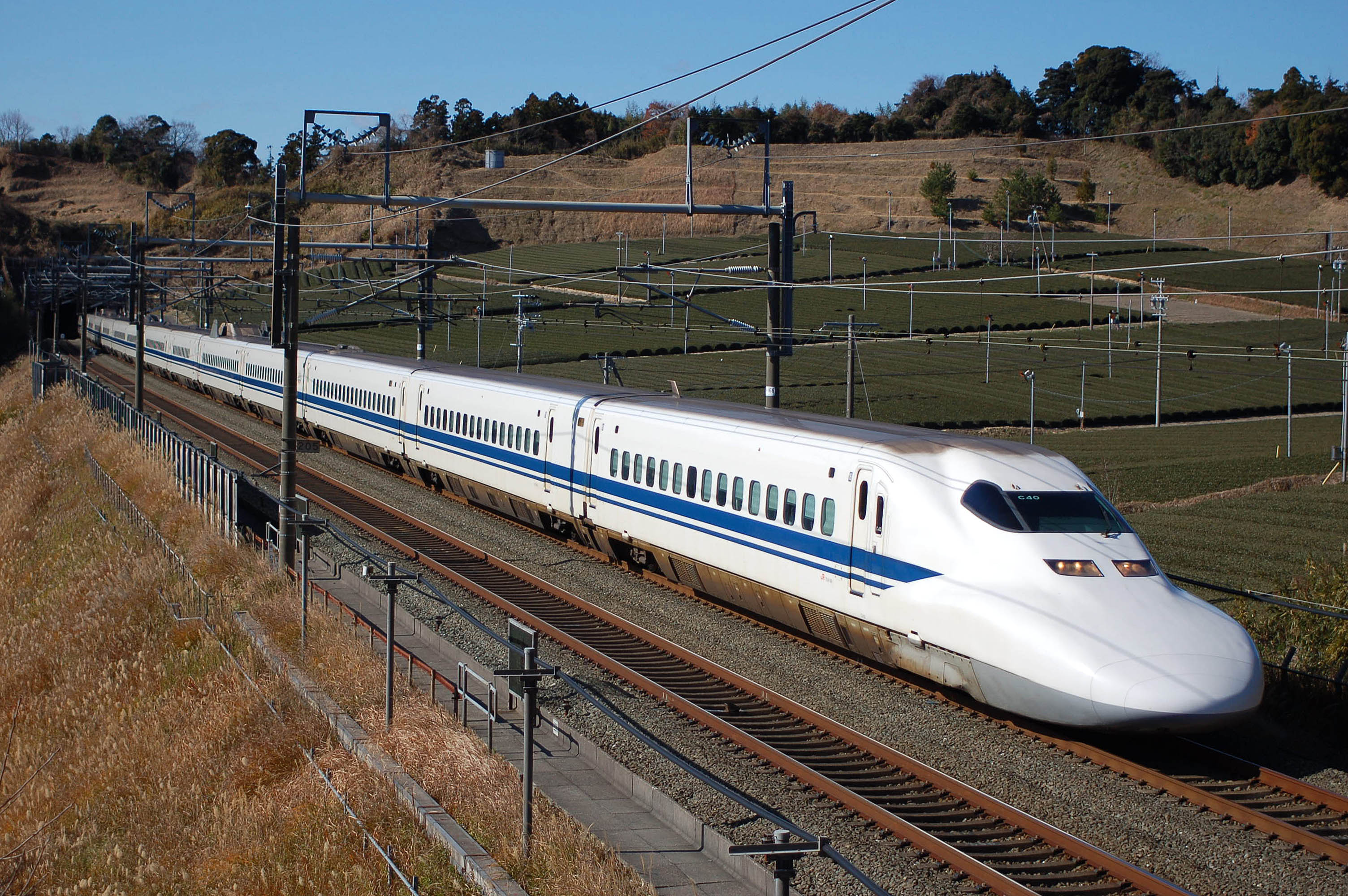
700 series

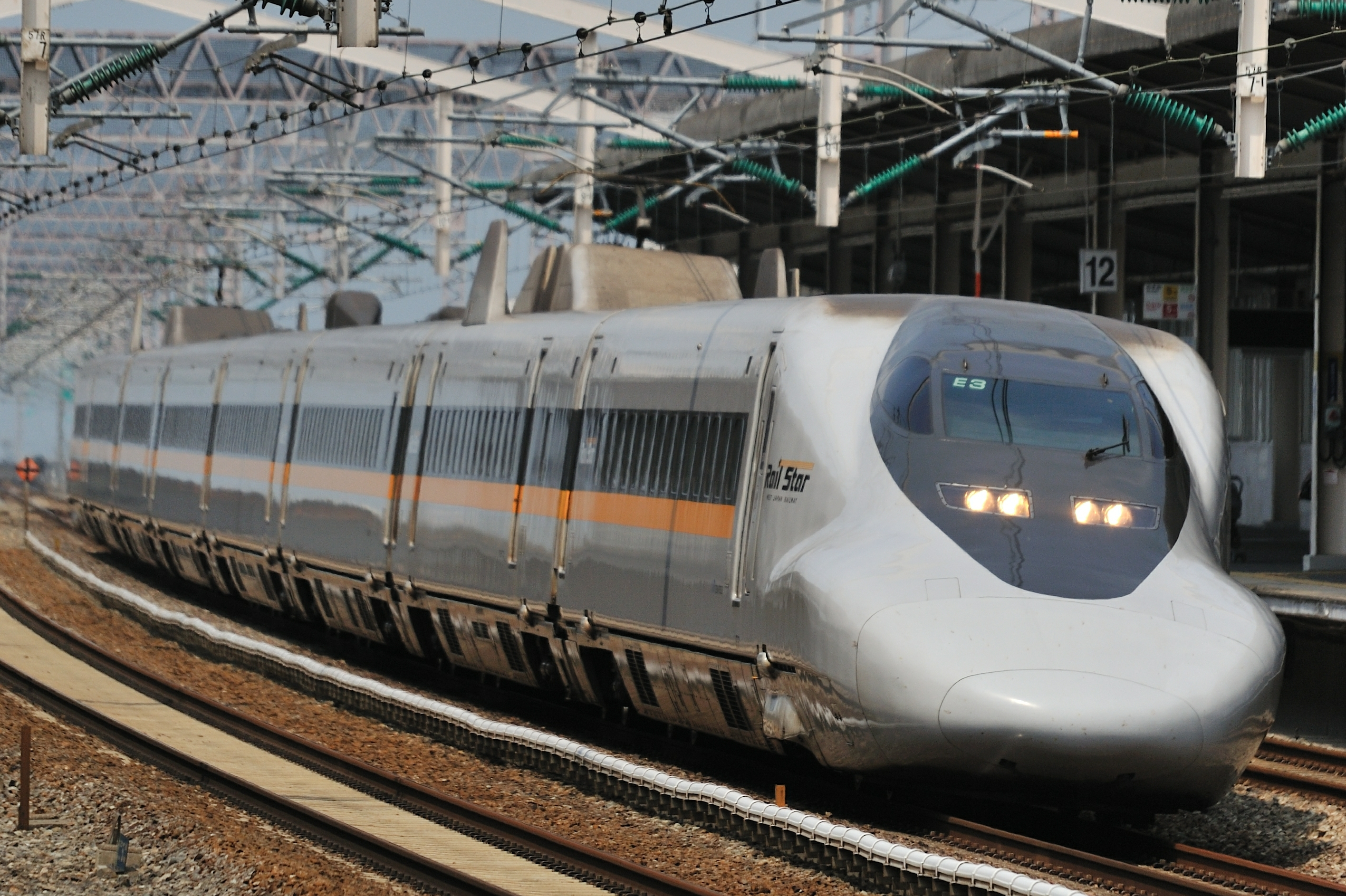
700 series (Hikari Rail Star)

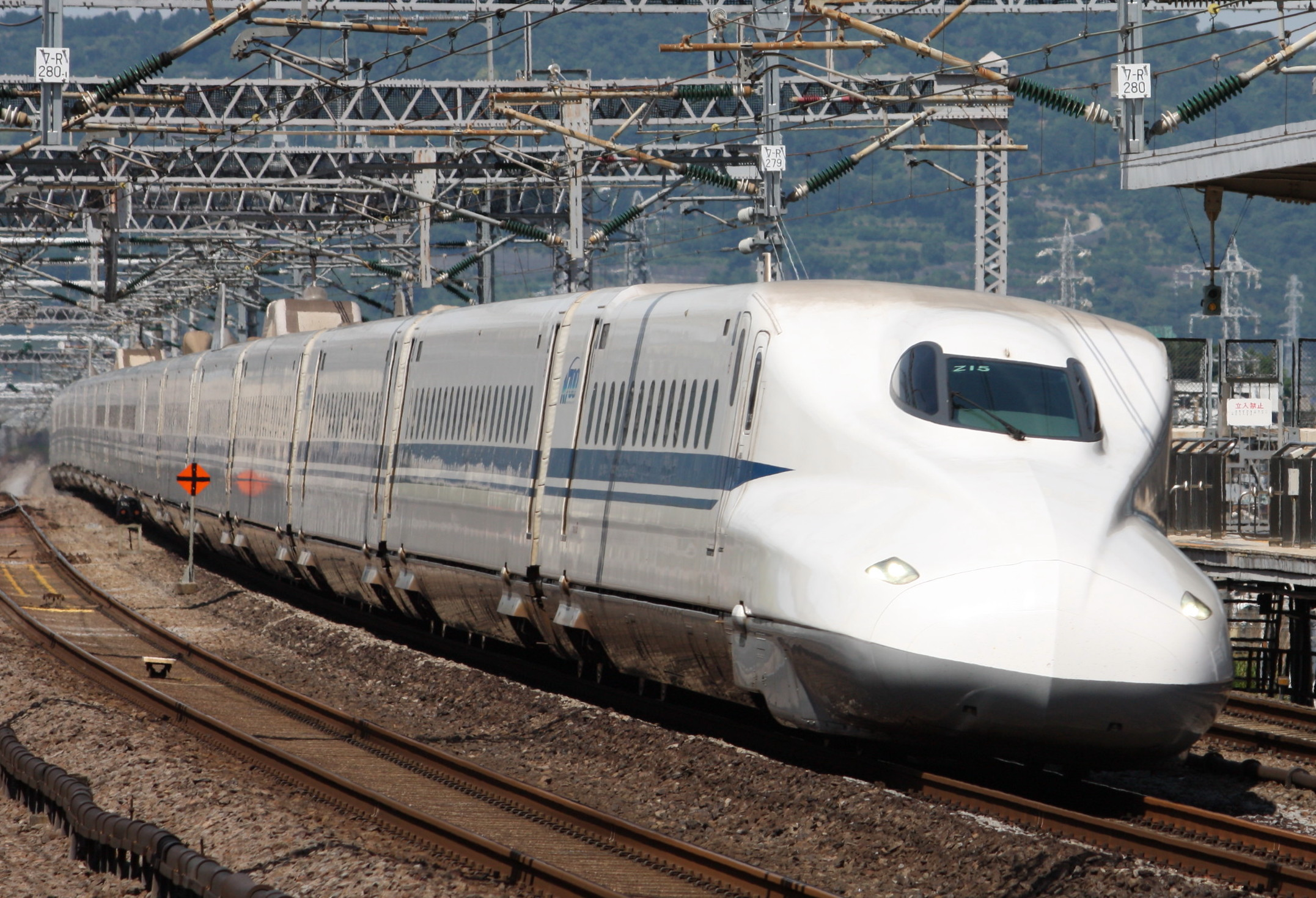
N700 series

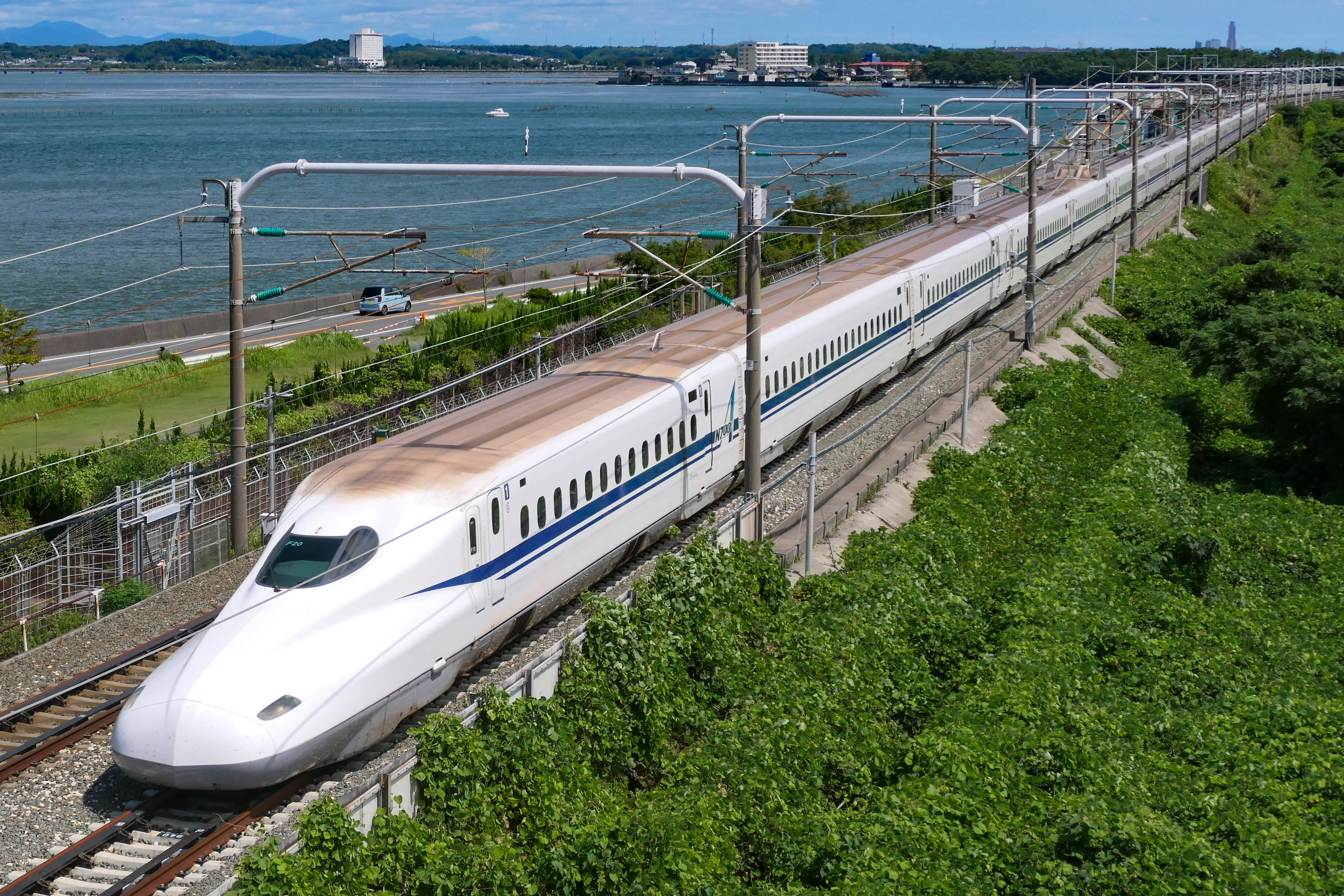
N700A series

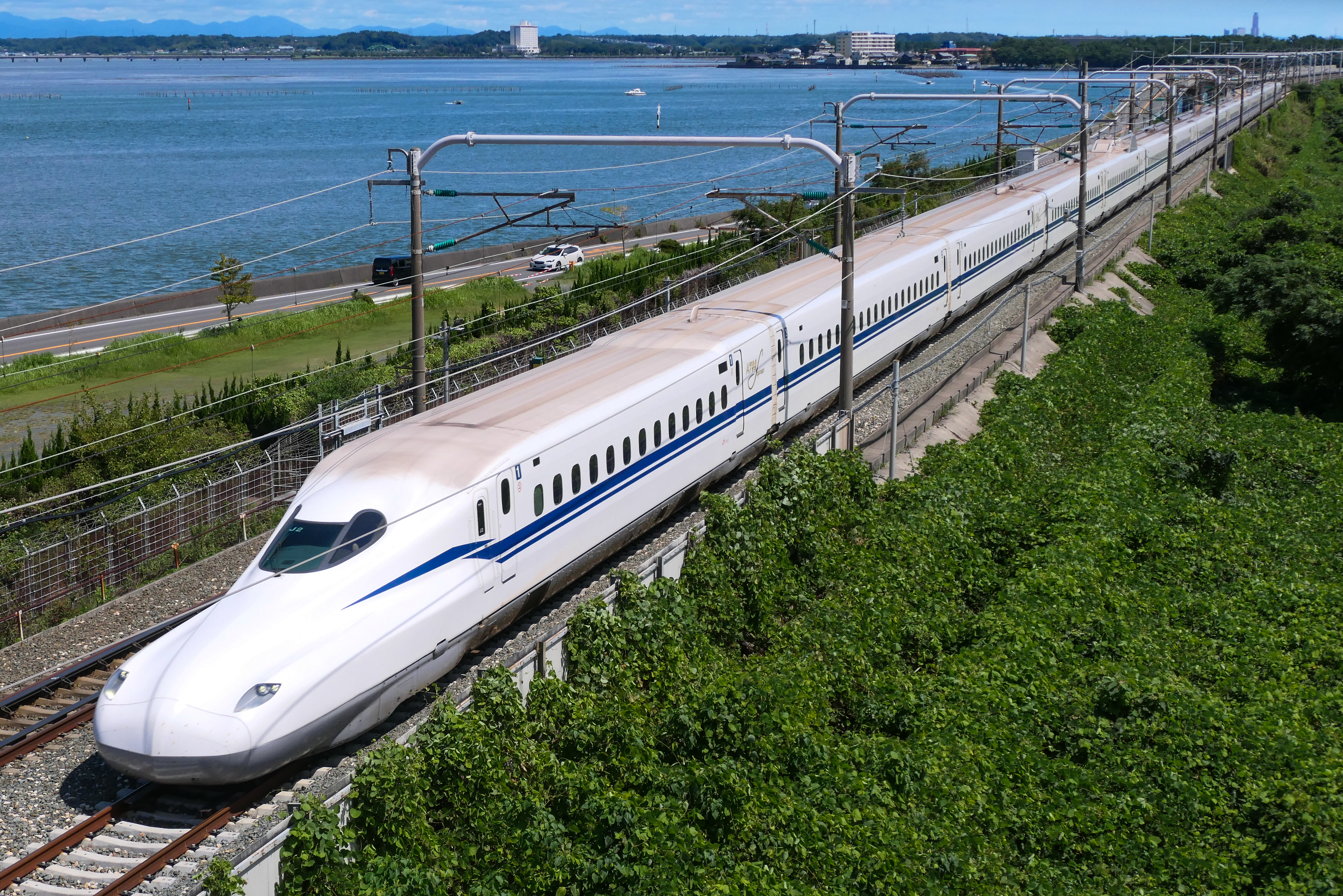
N700S series

==== Kyushu and Nishi Kyushu Shinkansen ====
- 800 series – 6-car trainsets introduced in March 2004 on the Kyushu Shinkansen with a maximum speed of 260 km/h (160 mph).
- N700-7000/8000 series – 8-car trainsets introduced in March 2011 on the Kyushu Shinkansen with a maximum speed of 300 km/h (185 mph).
- N700S-8000 series – 6-car trainsets introduced in 2022 on the Nishi Kyushu Shinkansen with a maximum speed of 260 km/h (160 mph).
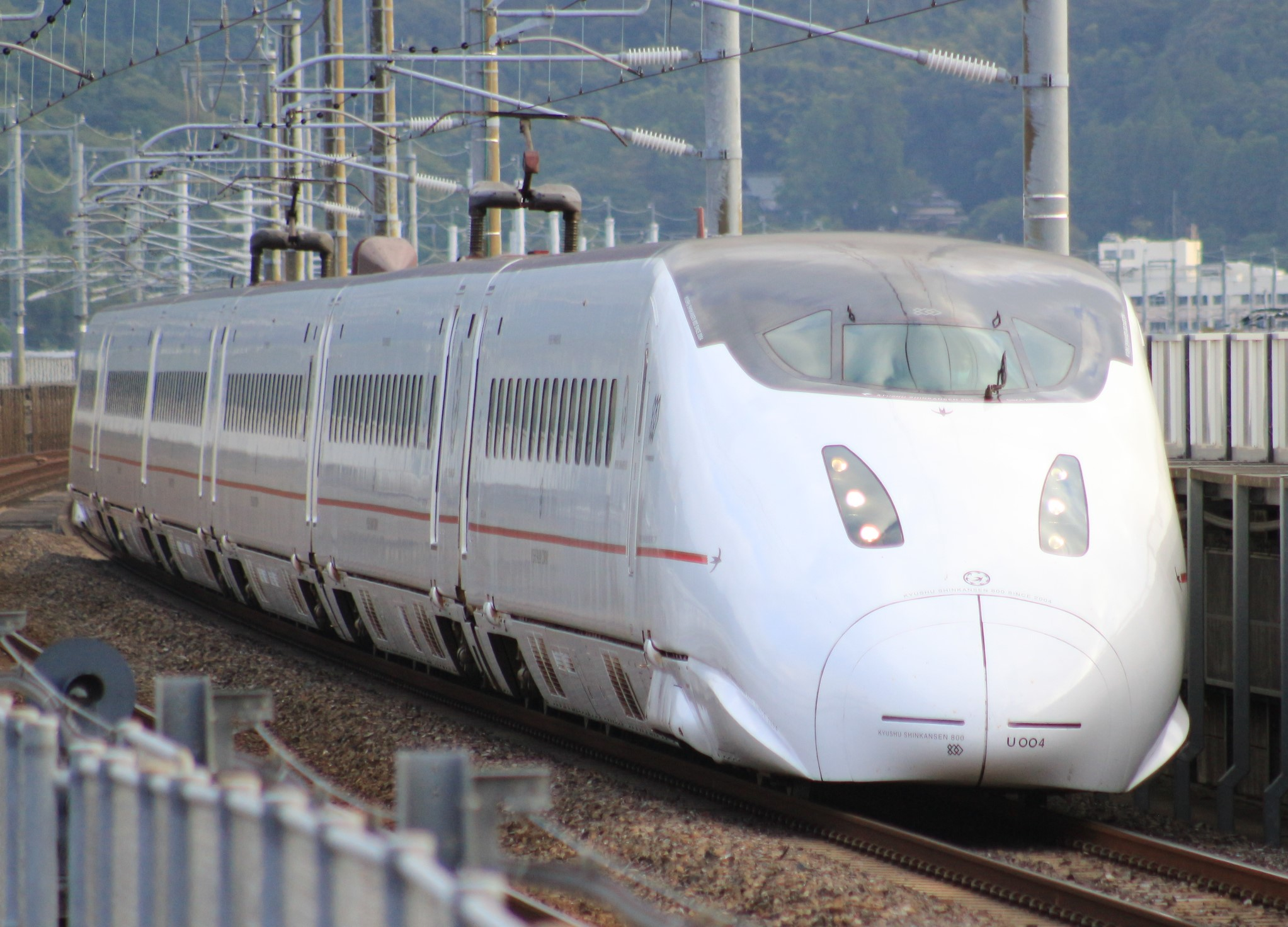
800 series

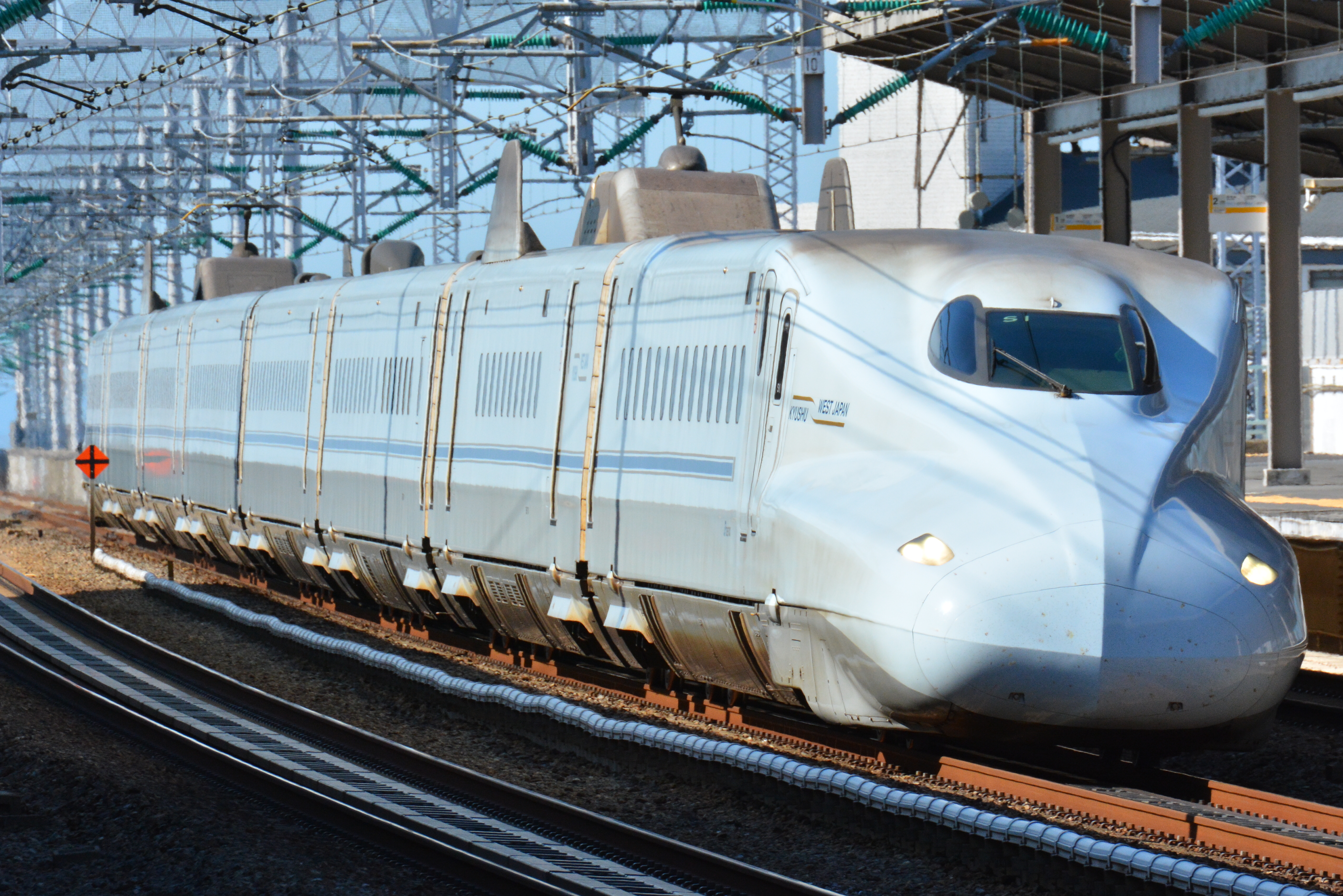
N700 series

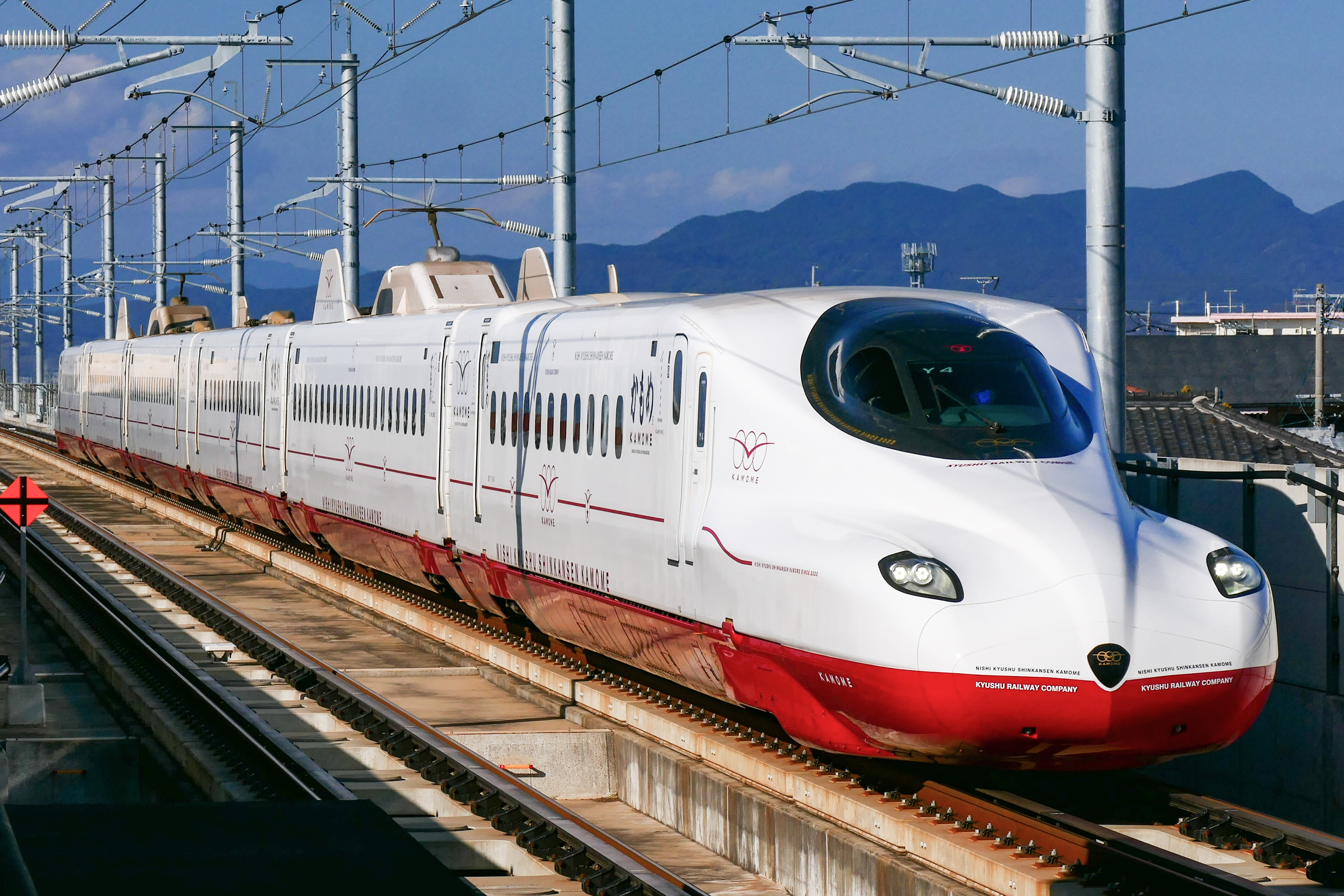
N700S-8000 series (Nishi Kyushu)

==== Tōhoku, Jōetsu, Hokuriku and Hokkaido Shinkansen ====
- 200 series – The first type introduced on the Tōhoku and Jōetsu Shinkansen in 1982. The first Shinkansen type designed for cold-weather operation, with a maximum operating speed of 240 km/h (150 mph). Trainsets were operated in 10-, 12-, and 16-car formations; the final configuration was 10 cars. Withdrawn from service in April 2013.
- E1 series – Double-deck 12-car trainsets introduced in 1994 for use on the Tōhoku and Jōetsu Shinkansen. They had a maximum operating speed of 240 km/h (150 mph) and were withdrawn in September 2012.
- E2 series – Introduced in 1997, operating in 8- and 10-car formations. The type has a maximum operating speed of 275 km/h (170 mph) and remains in service on the Tōhoku Shinkansen. It was previously used on the Hokuriku and Jōetsu Shinkansen.
- E4 series – Double-deck 8-car trainsets introduced in 1997 and used on the Tōhoku, Jōetsu, and Hokuriku Shinkansen. Maximum operating speed was 240 km/h (150 mph). The type was withdrawn from service in October 2021.
- E5 series – 10-car trainsets introduced in March 2011, operating primarily on the Tōhoku Shinkansen. The type has a maximum operating speed of 320 km/h (200 mph).
  - H5 series – A cold-weather derivative of the E5 series, introduced from March 2016 for use primarily on the Hokkaido Shinkansen.
- E7/W7 series – 12-car trainsets introduced in March 2014 for the Hokuriku Shinkansen and later introduced on the Jōetsu Shinkansen in 2019. Maximum operating speed is 260 km/h (160 mph) on the Hokuriku Shinkansen and 275 km/h (171 mph) on the Jōetsu Shinkansen. The E7 series is owned by JR East and the W7 series by JR West; the two types are otherwise identical.
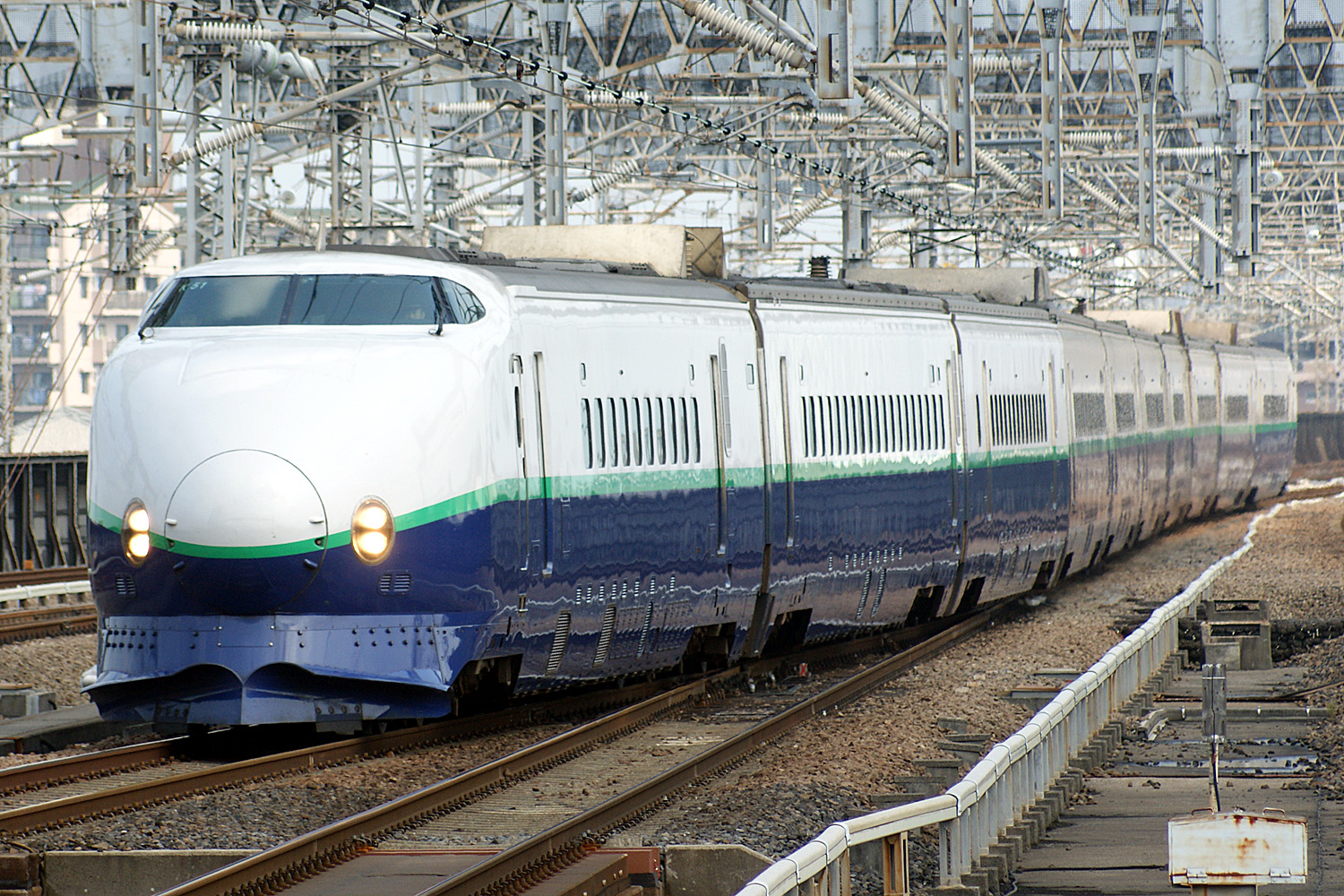
200 series

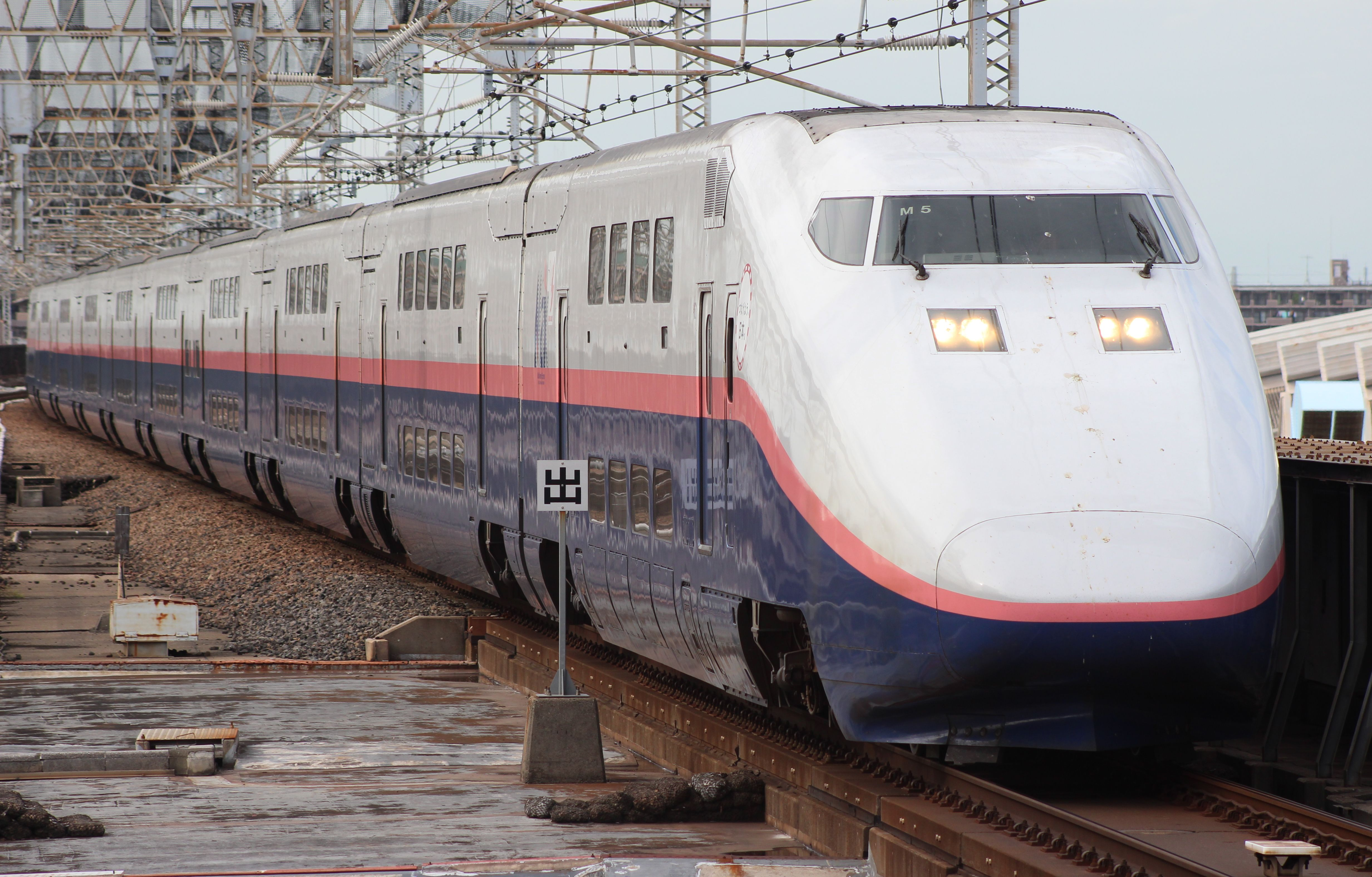
E1 series

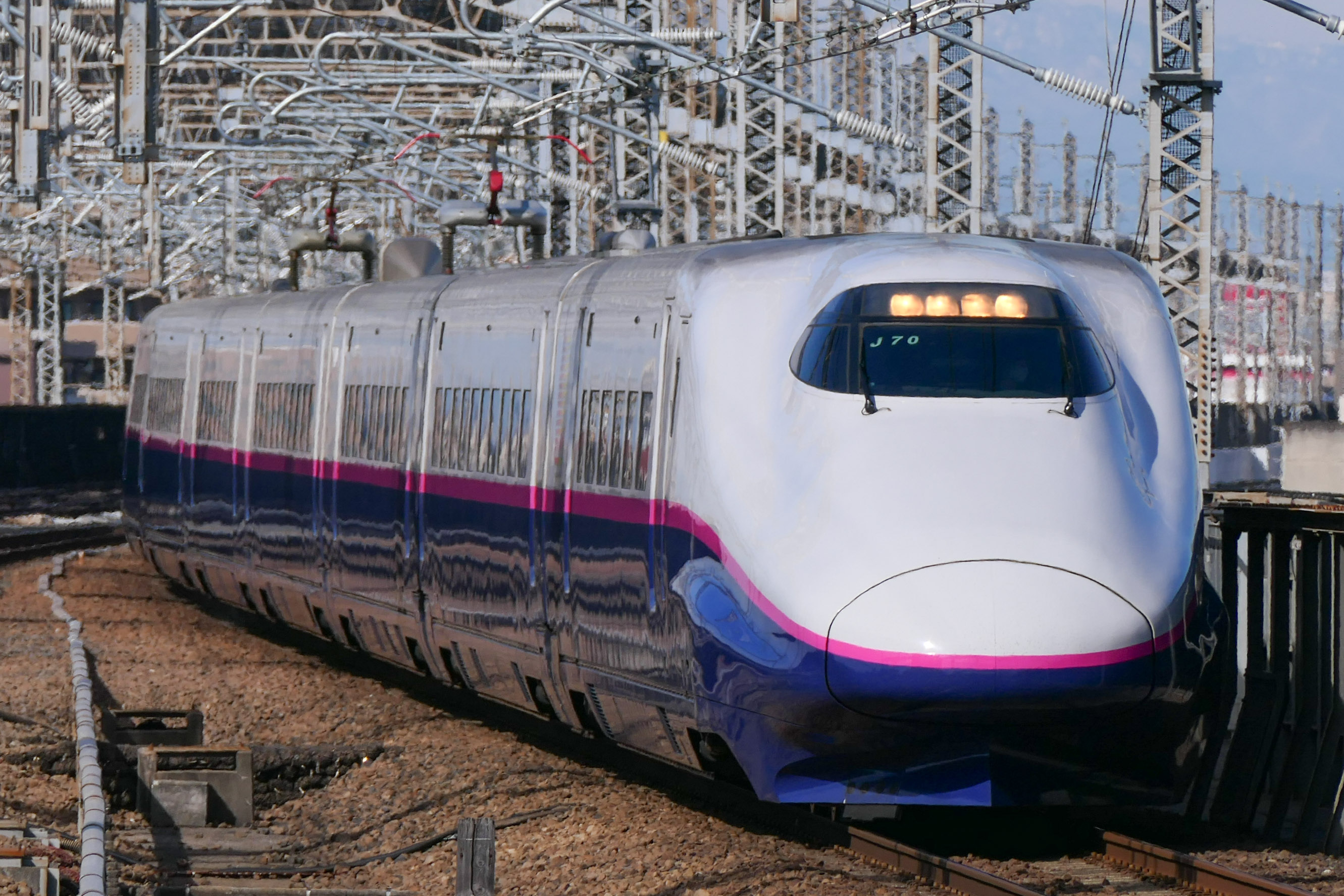
E2 series

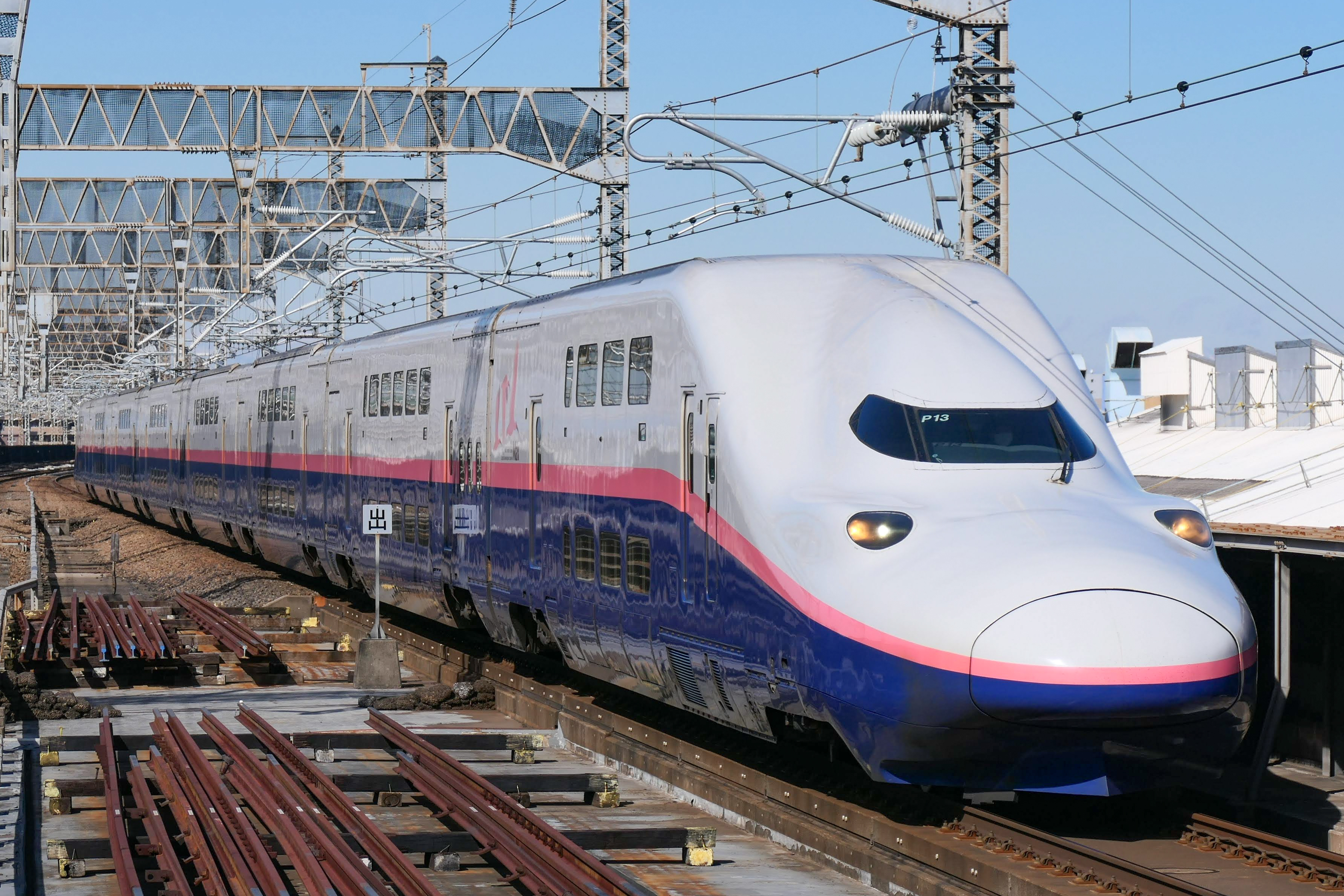
E4 series

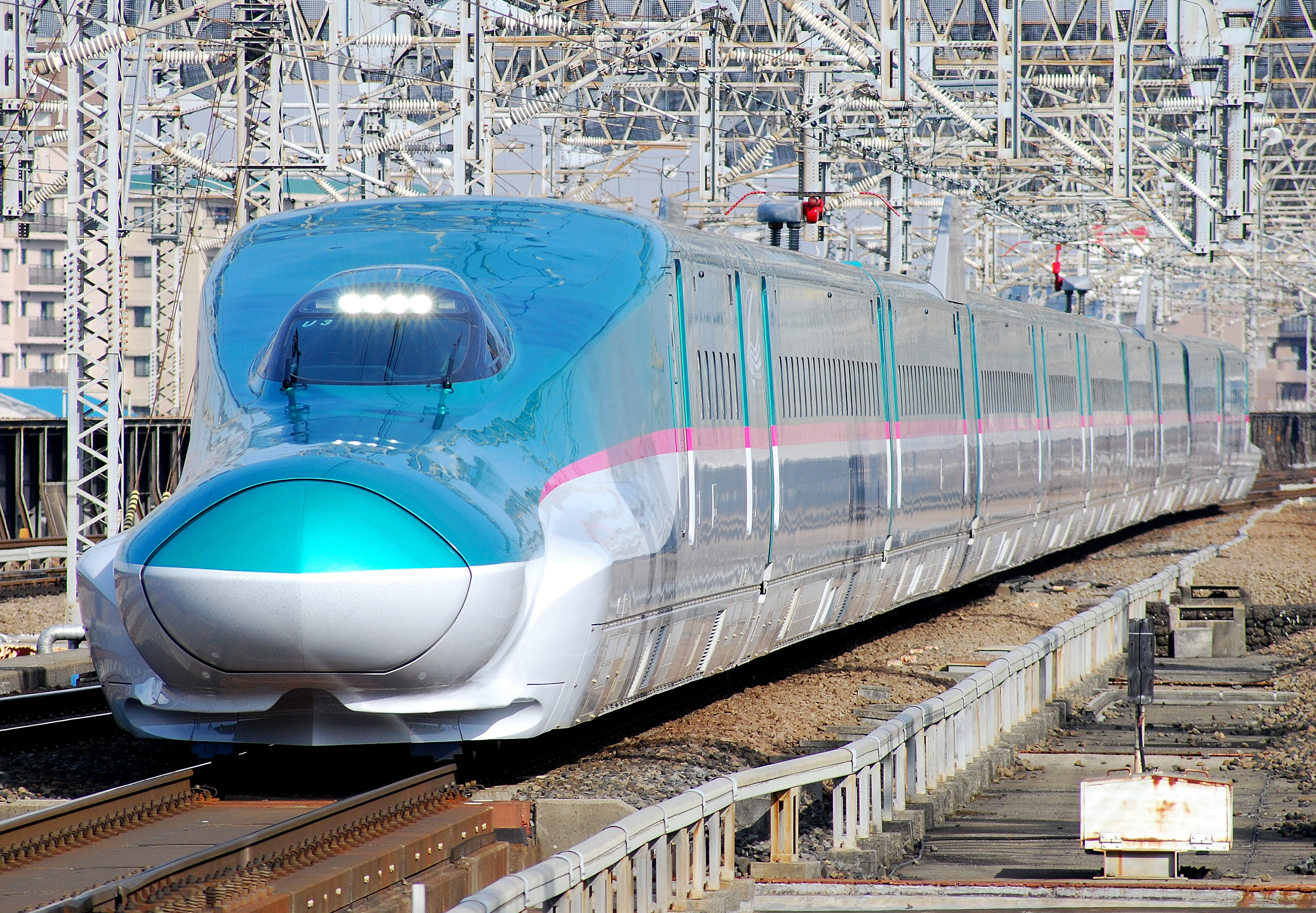
E5 series

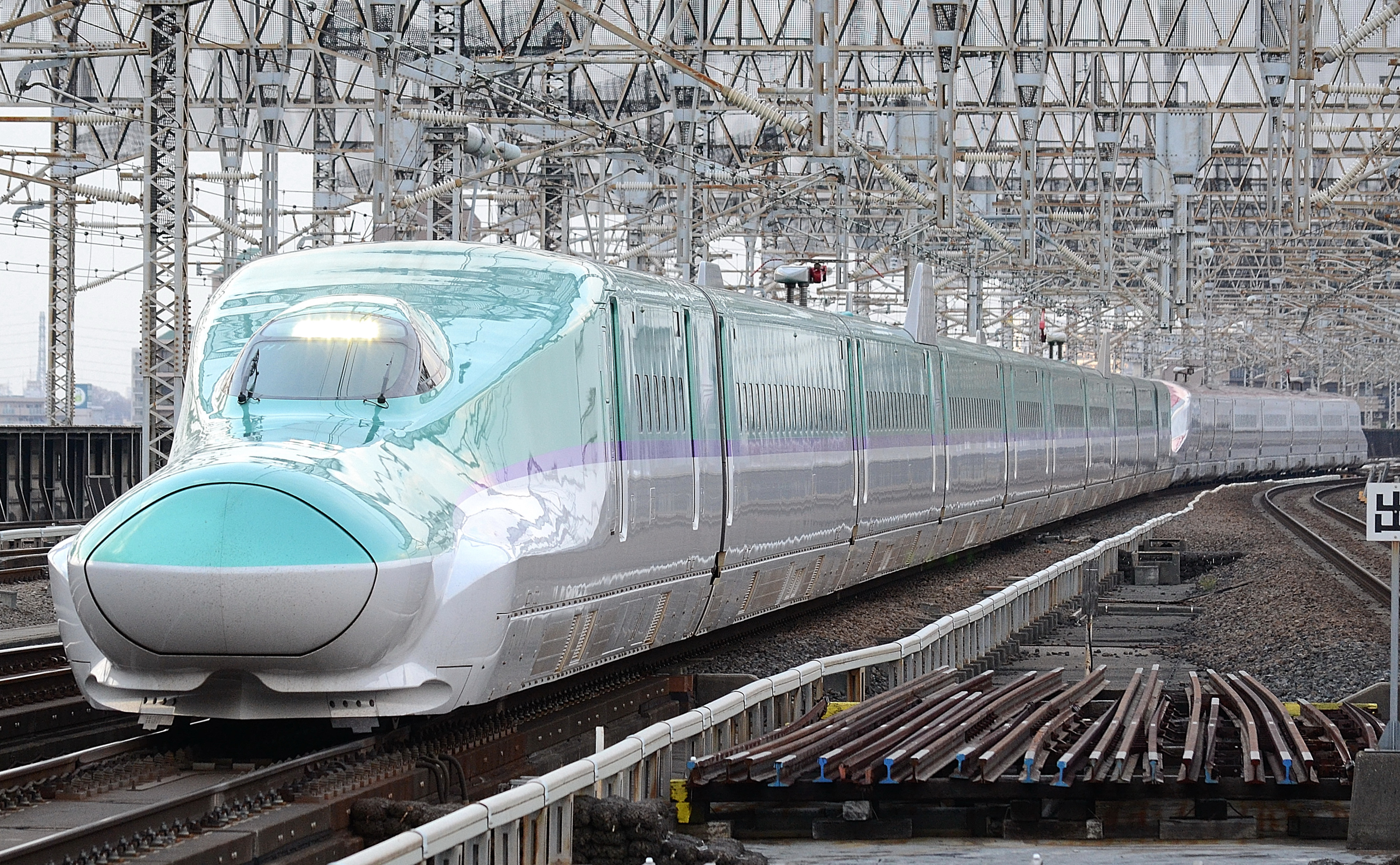
H5 series

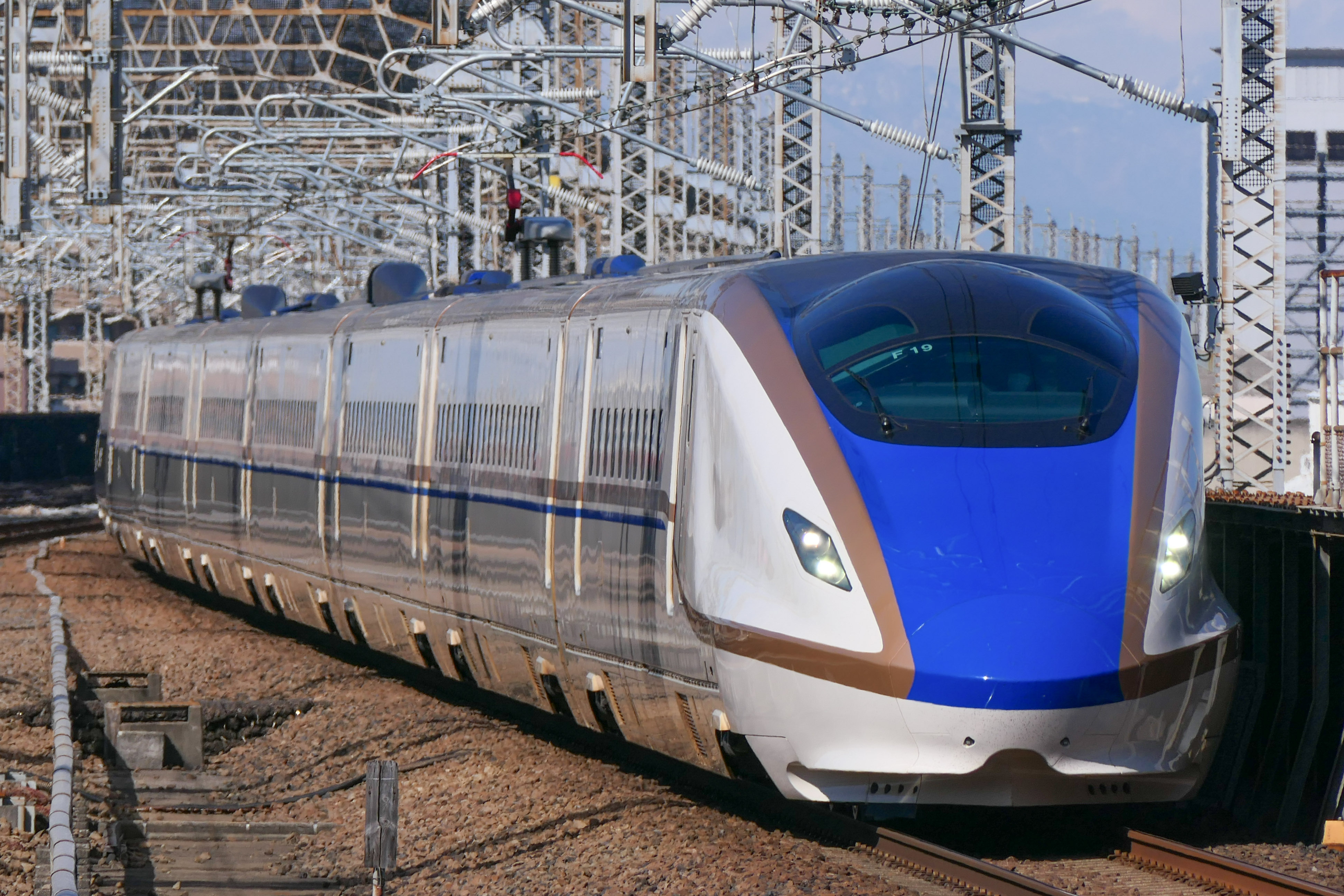
E7/W7 series

==== Yamagata and Akita Shinkansen ====
- 400 series – The first mini-Shinkansen train type, introduced in 1992 for services on the Yamagata Shinkansen. It had a maximum operating speed of 240 km/h (150 mph) and was withdrawn from service in April 2010.
- E3 series – Introduced in 1997 for the Akita Shinkansen, with a maximum operating speed of 275 km/h (170 mph). Additional trainsets were built for use on the Yamagata Shinkansen. From 2014 onward, the type has been used exclusively on the Yamagata Shinkansen. Withdrawn from service in December 2025.
- E6 series – Introduced in March 2013 as the replacement for the E3 series on the Akita Shinkansen, featuring a maximum operating speed of 320 km/h (200 mph) on the mainline Tōhoku shinkansen, however limited to 130 km/h (80 mph) on the Akita Shinkansen.
- E8 series – Introduced in March 2024 as the replacement for the E3 series on the Yamagata Shinkansen. The type has a maximum operating speed of 300 km/h (185 mph) on the mainline Tōhoku shinkansen, however limited to 130 km/h (80 mph) on the Yamagata Shinkansen.
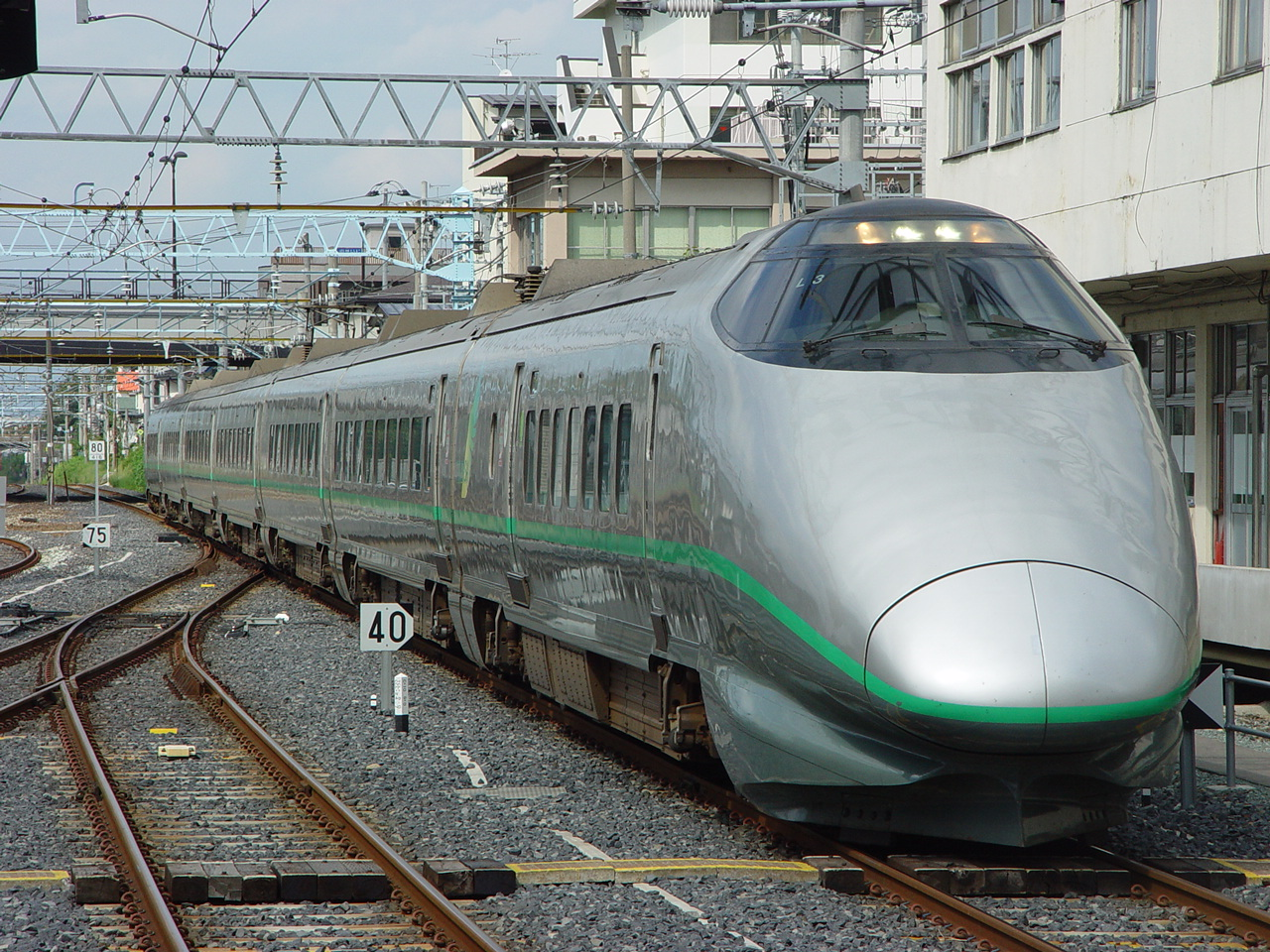
400 series

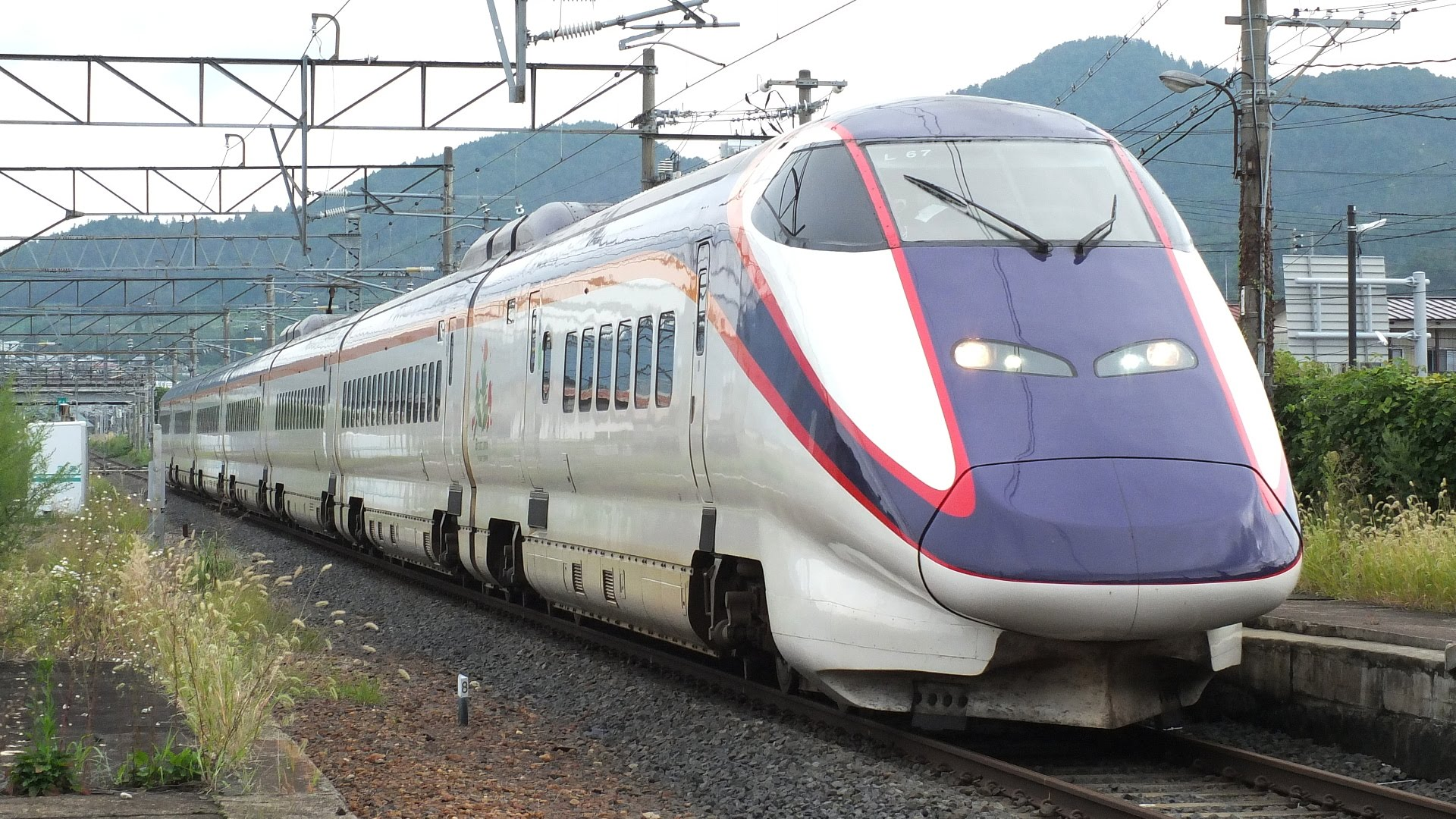
E3 series

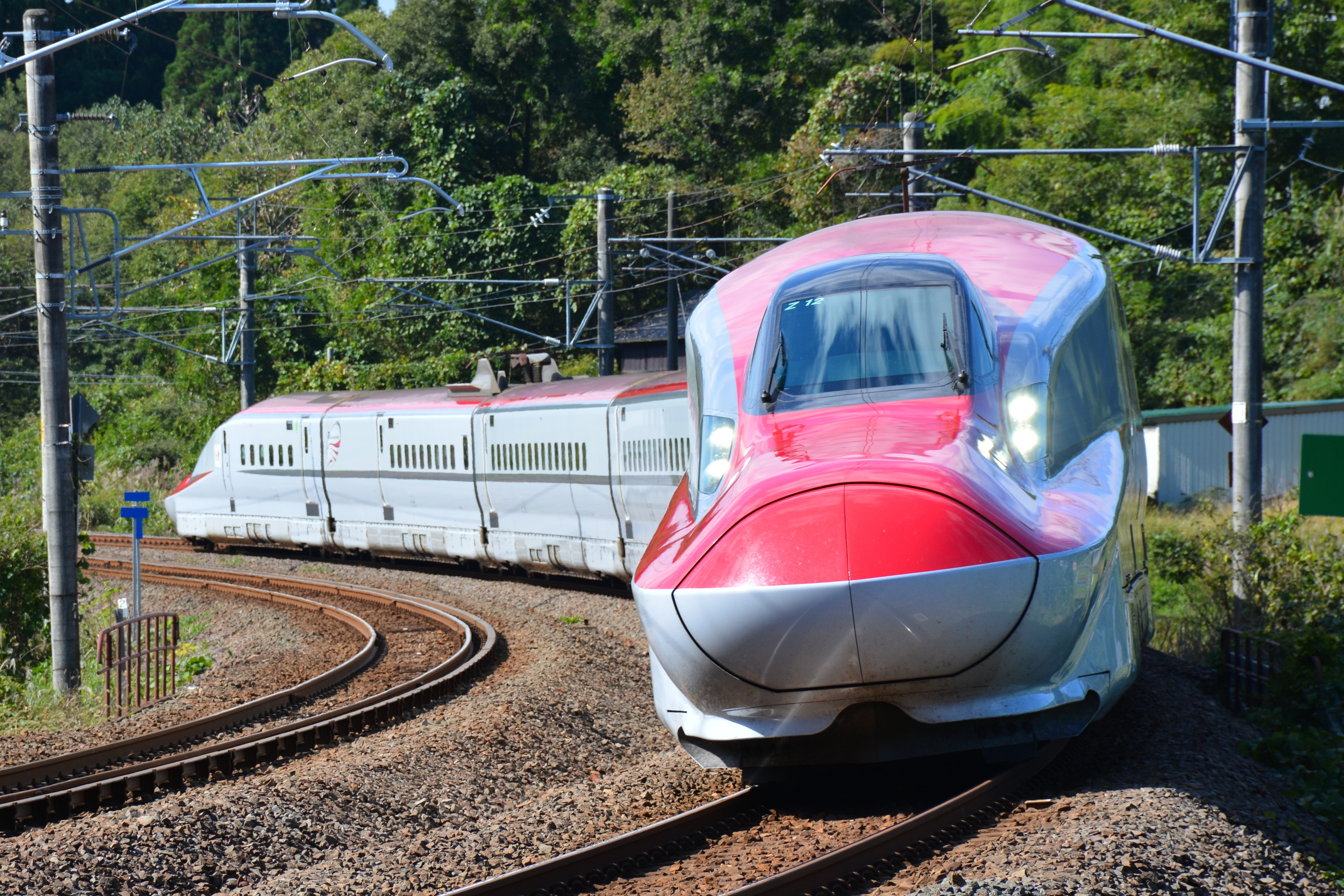
E6 series

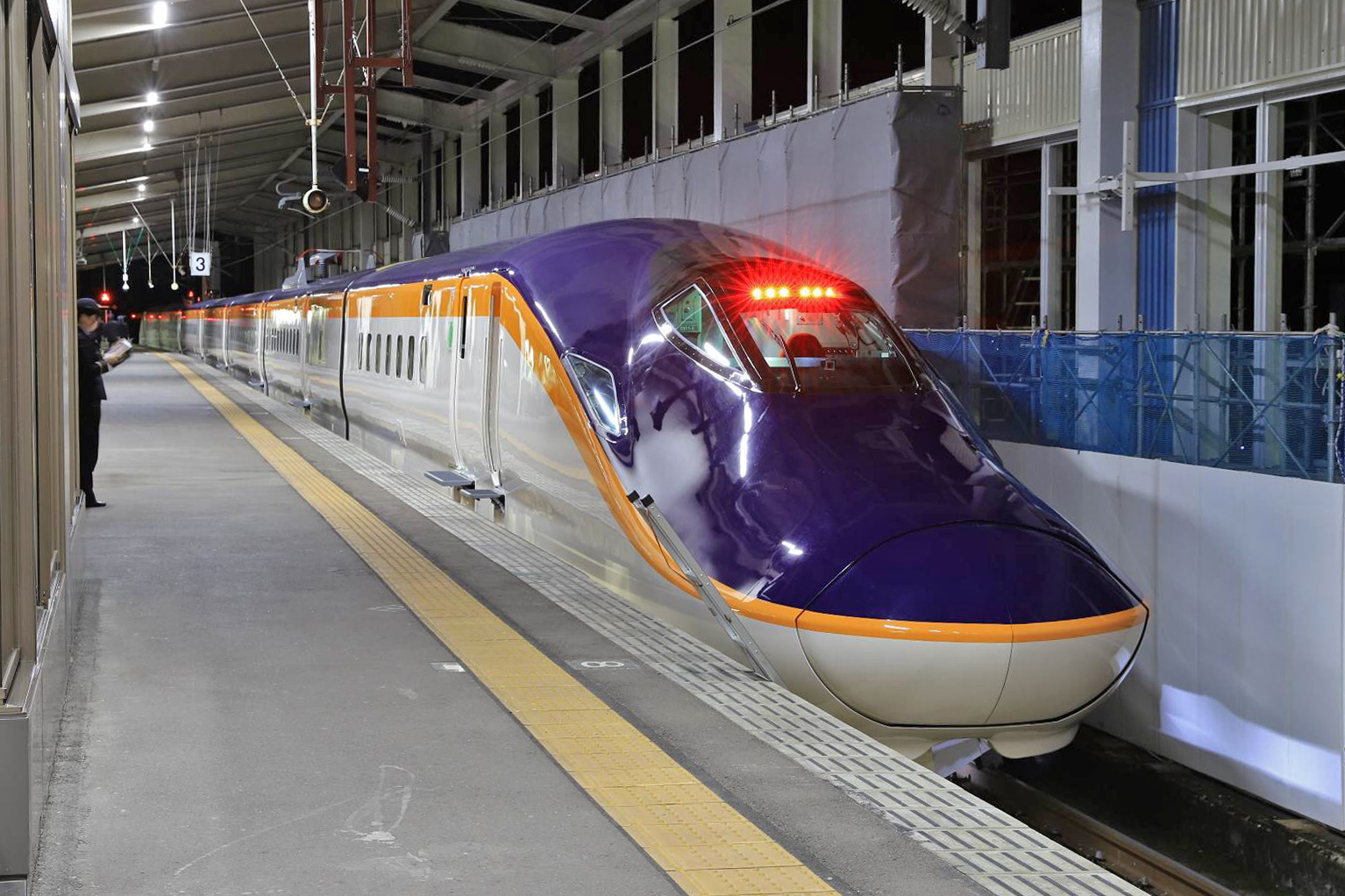
E8 series

=== Experimental trains ===
- Class 1000 – 1961
- Class 951 – 1969
- Class 961 – 1973
- Class 962 – 1979
- 500-900 series "WIN350" – 1992
- Class 952/953 "STAR21" – 1992
- Class 955 "300X" – 1994
- Gauge Change Train – 1998 to present
- Class E954 "Fastech 360S" – 2004
- Class E955 "Fastech 360Z" – 2005
- Class E956 "ALFA-X" – 2019
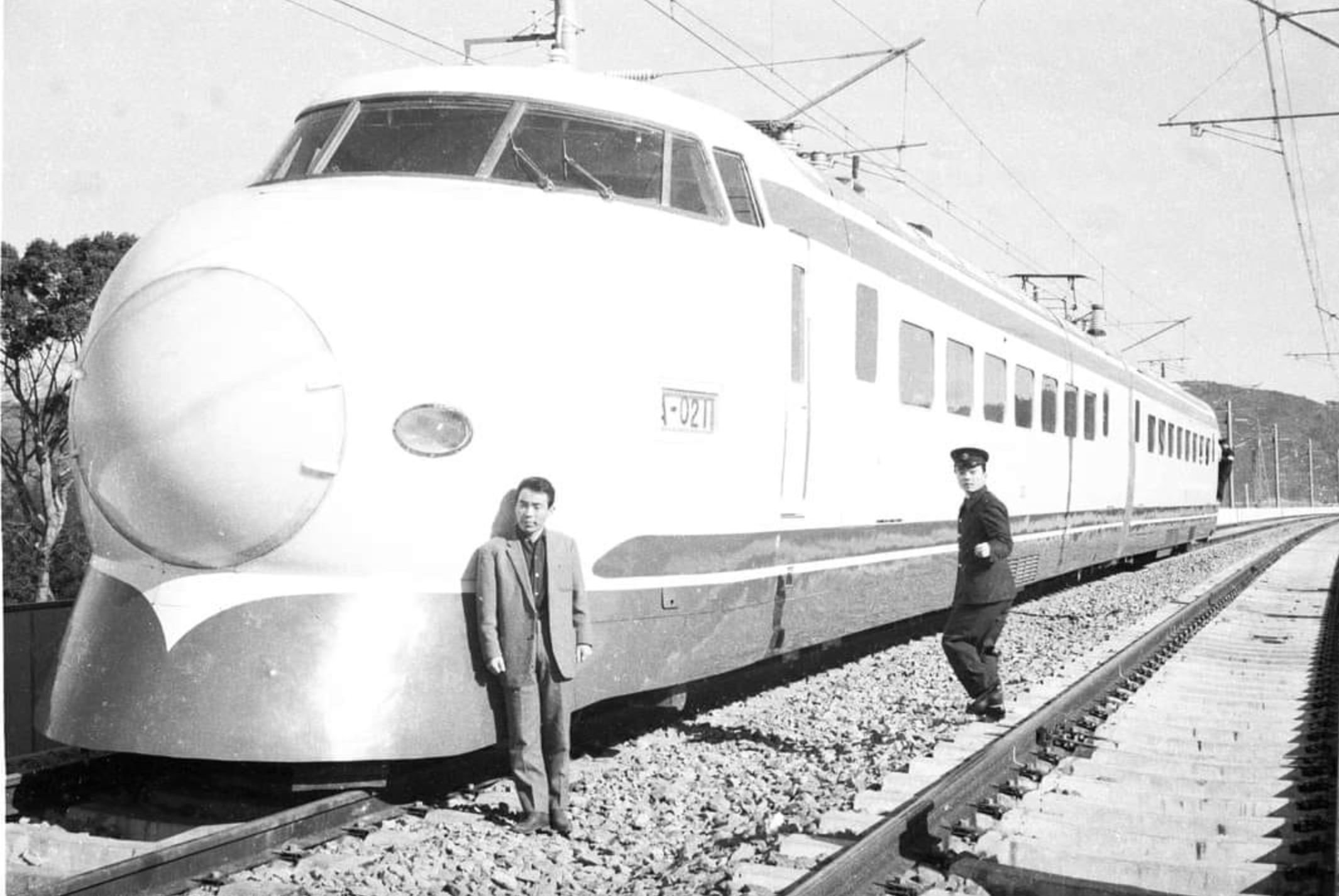
Class 1000

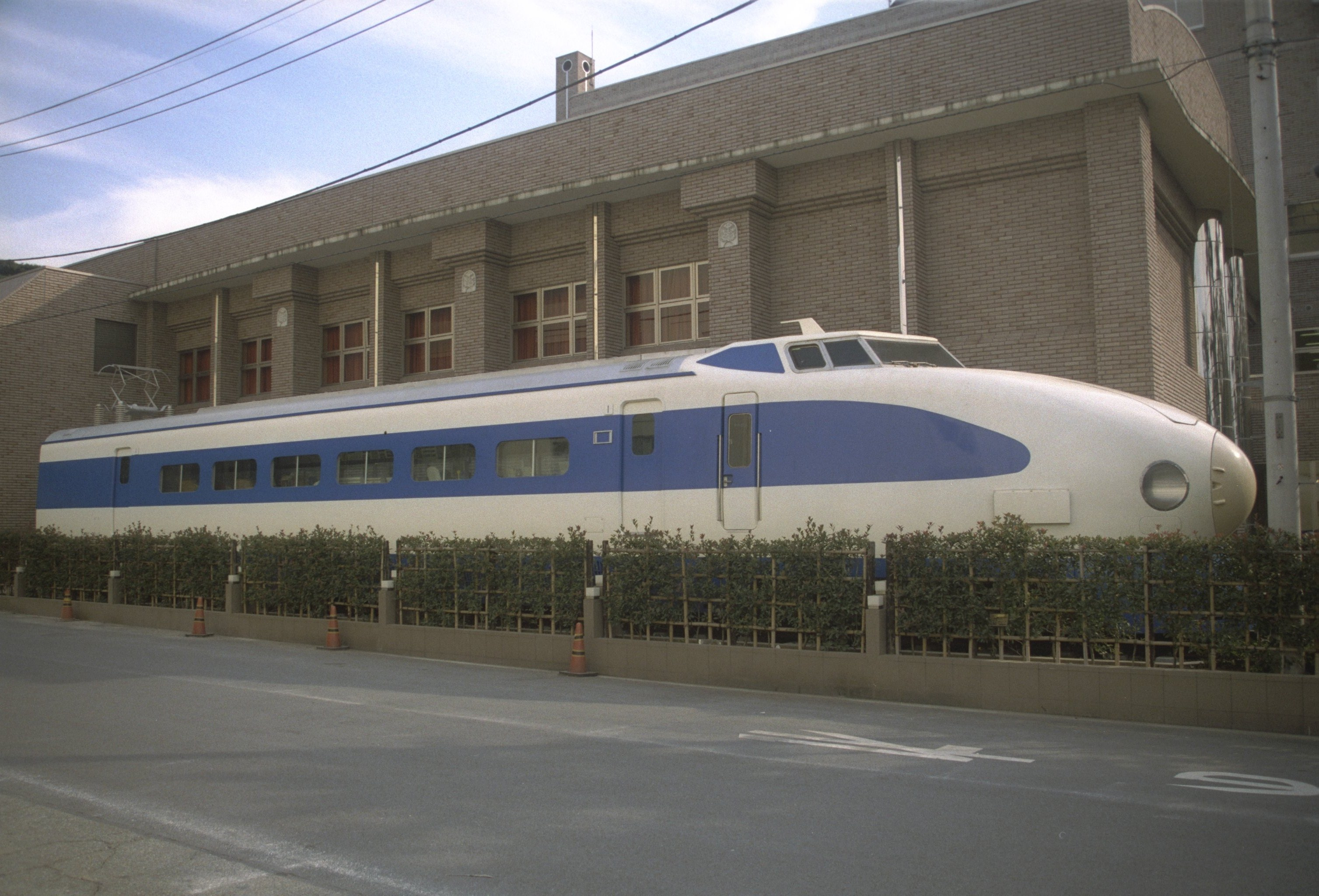
Class 951

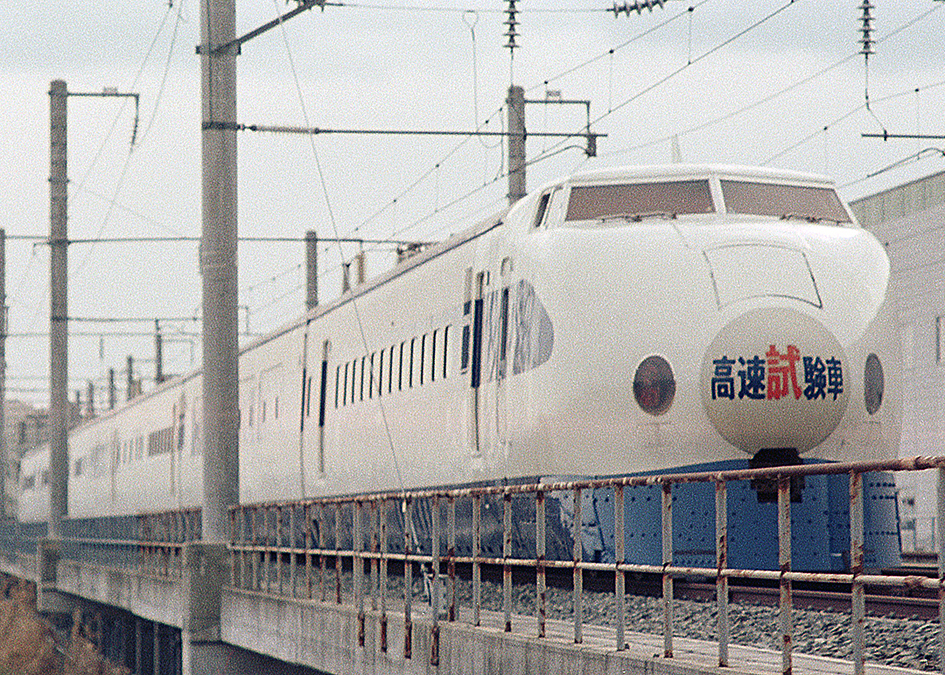
Class 961

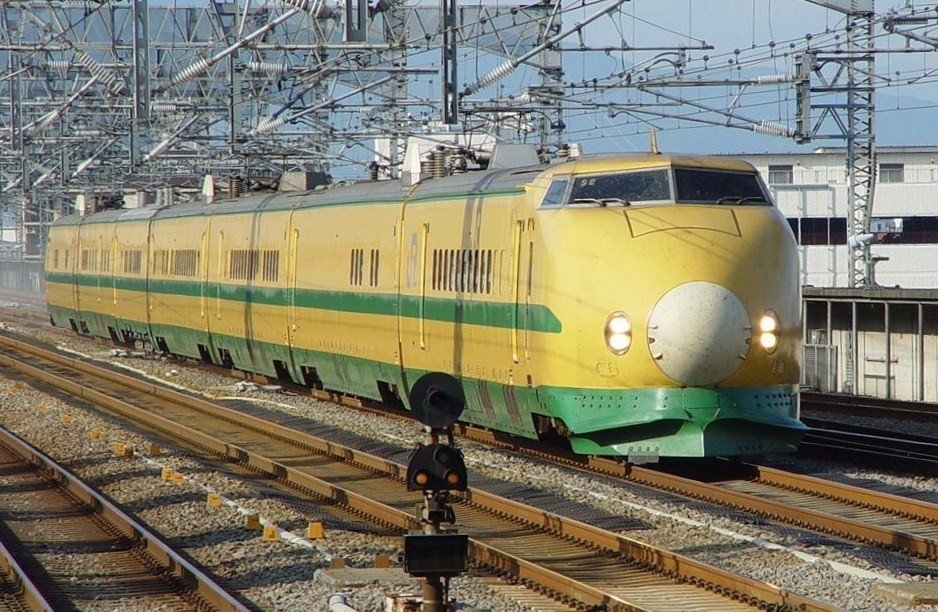
Class 962

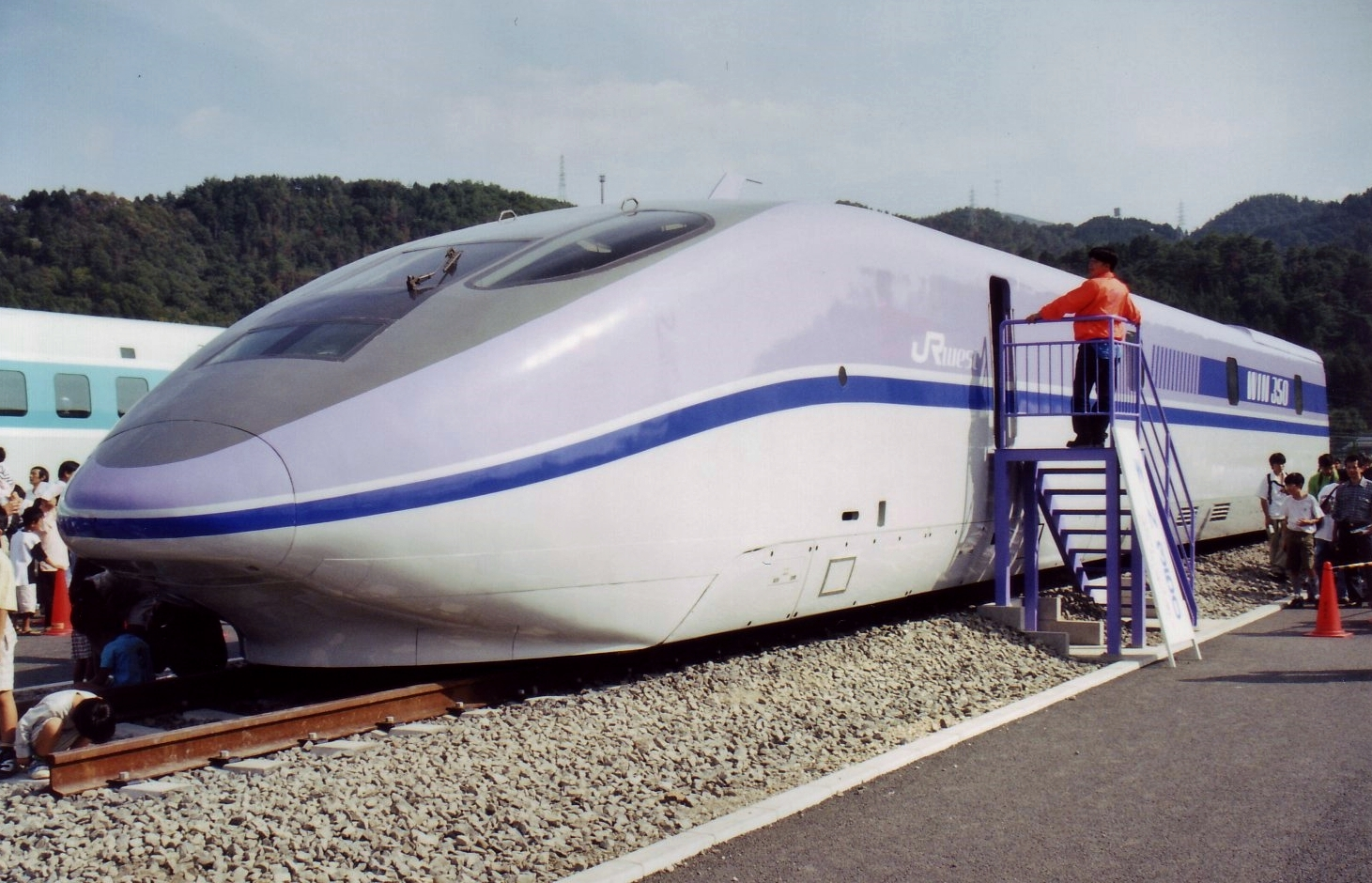
WIN350

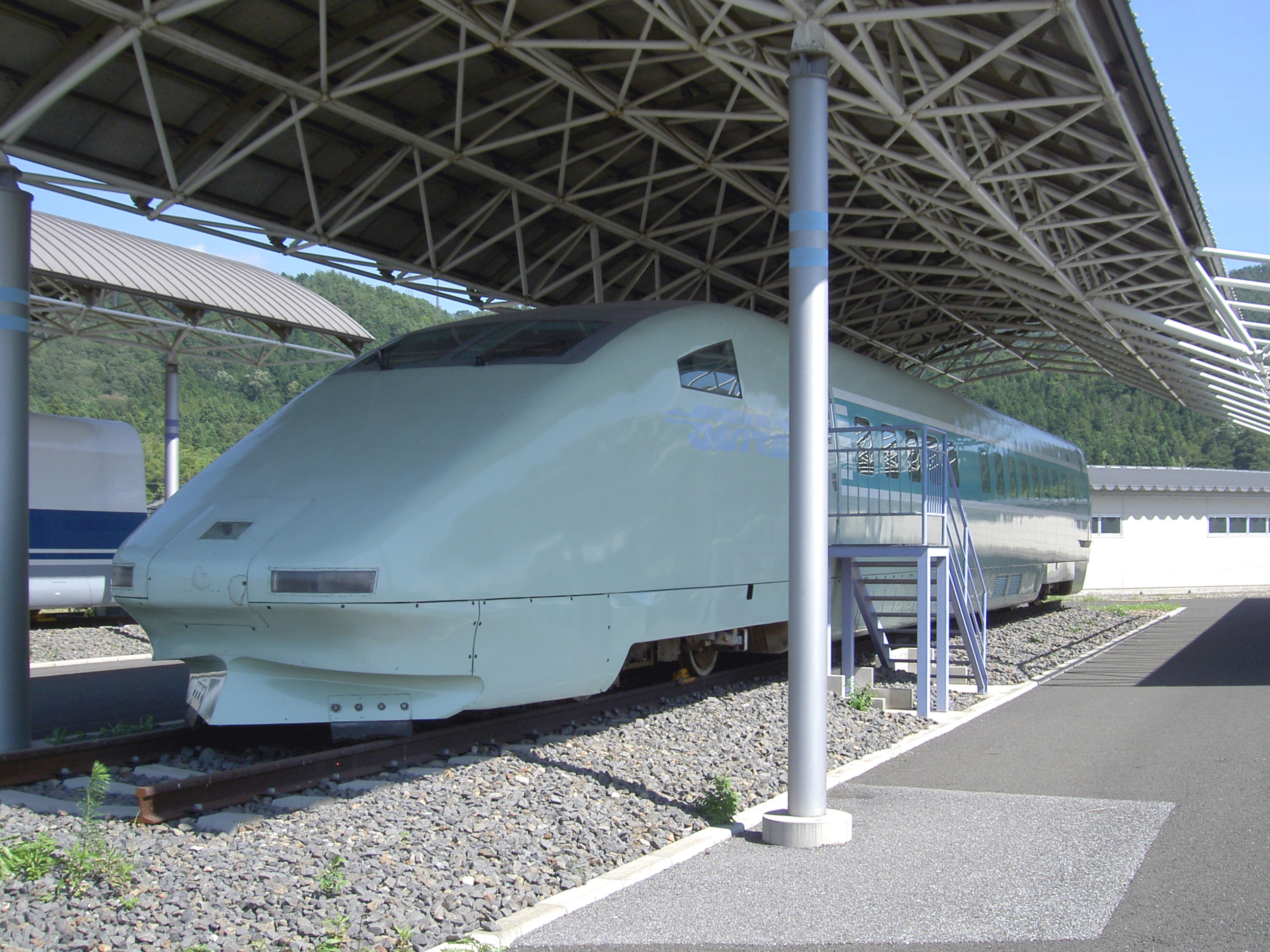
STAR21

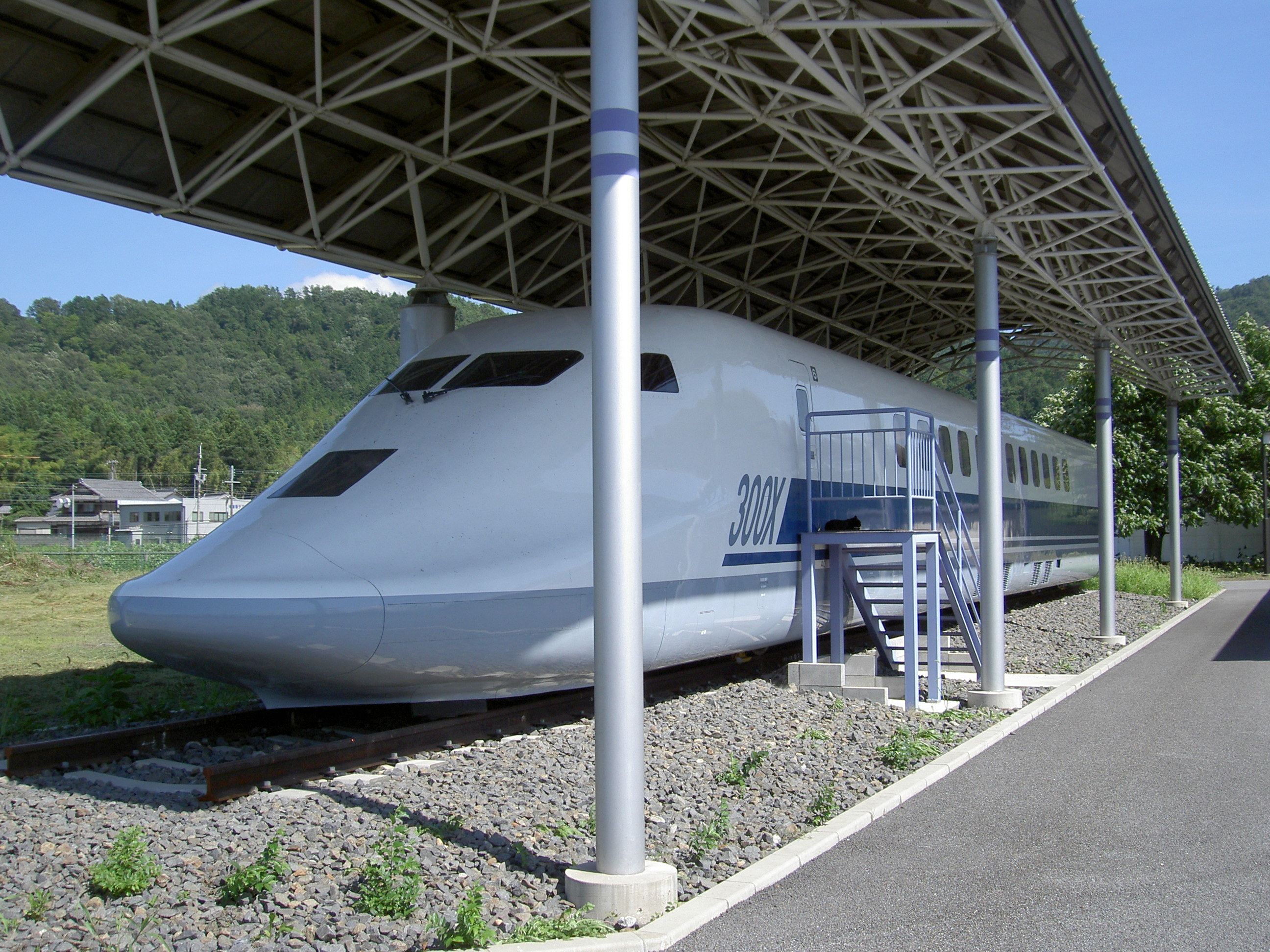
300X

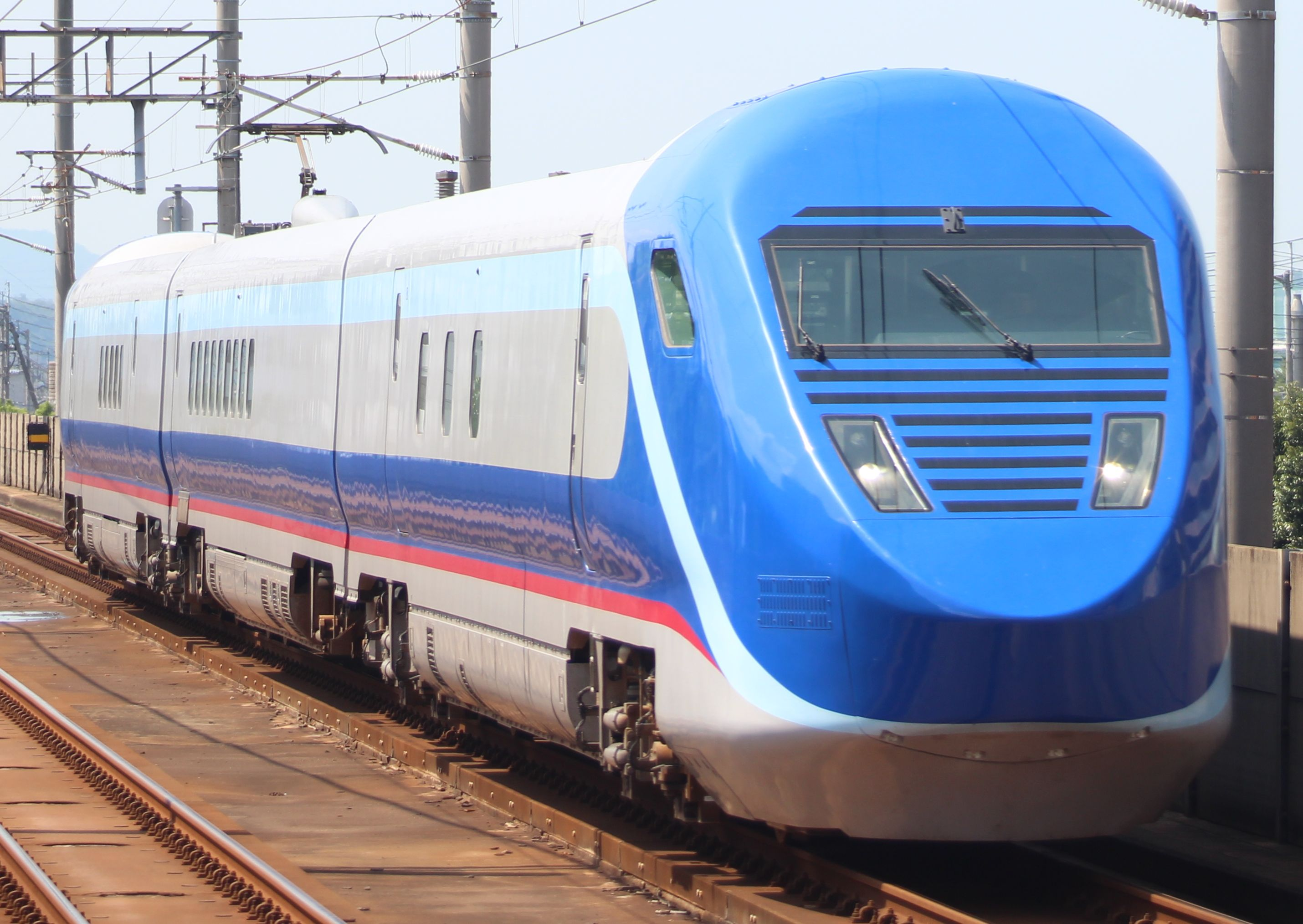
Gauge change train (2nd generation)

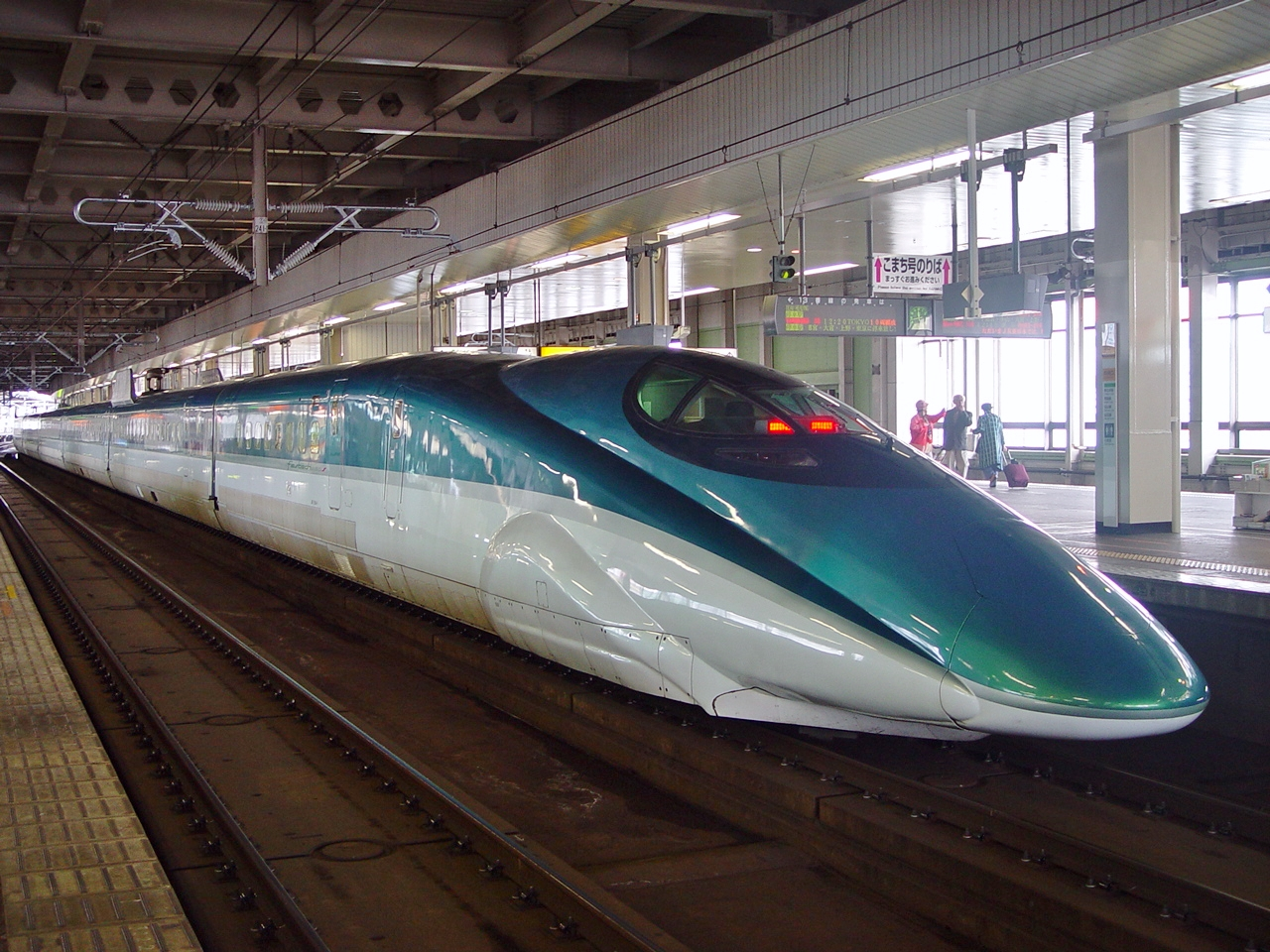
Fastech 360S

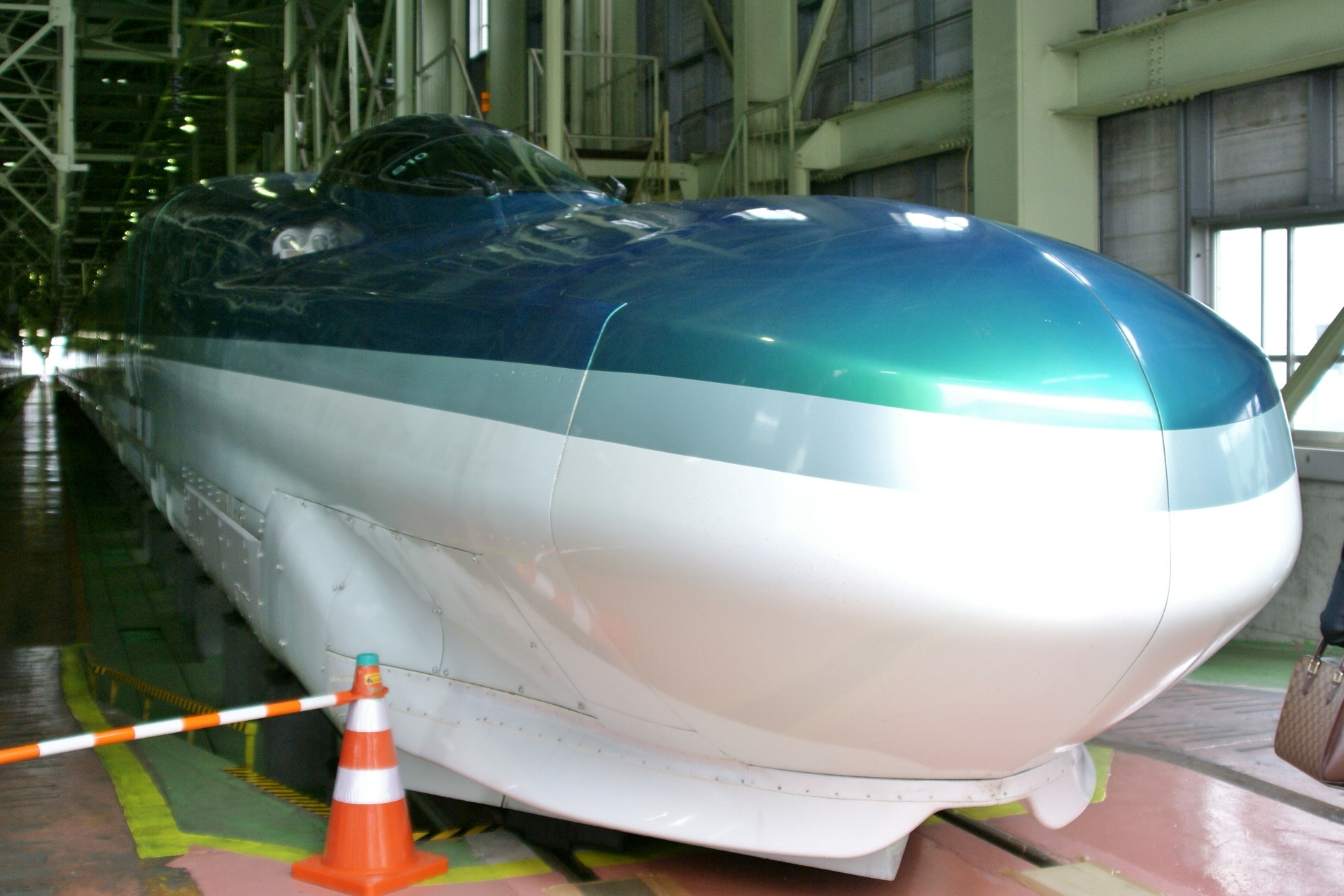
Fastech 360Z

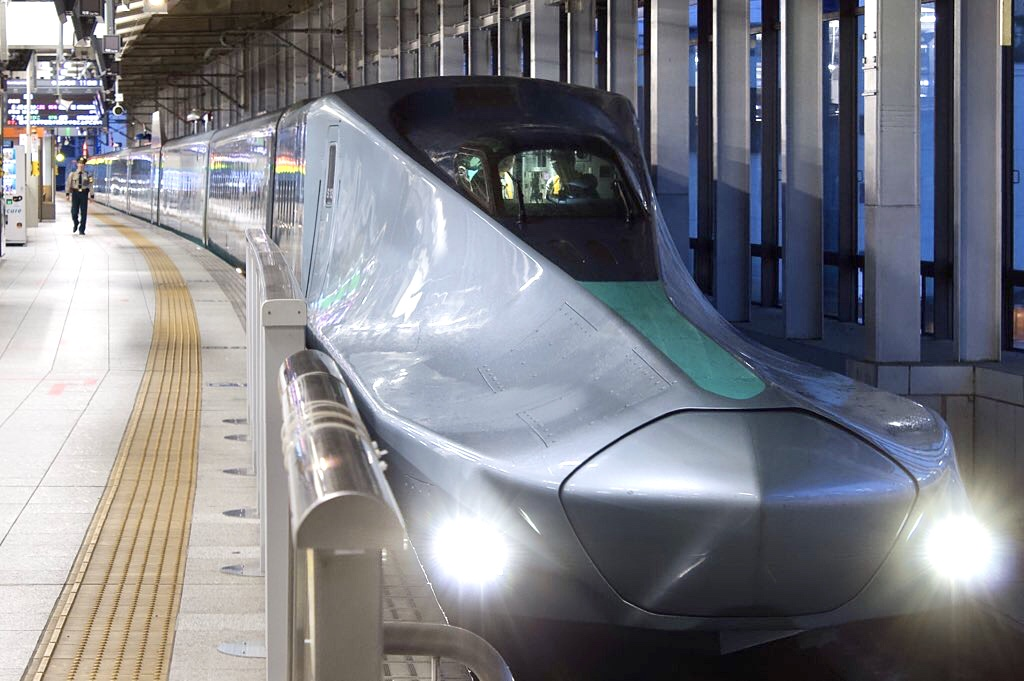
ALFA-X

=== Maintenance vehicles ===
- 911 Type diesel locomotive
- 912 Type diesel locomotive
- DD18 Type diesel locomotive
- DD19 Type diesel locomotive
- 941 Type (rescue train)
- 921 Type (track inspection car)
- 922 Type (Doctor Yellow sets T1, T2, T3)
- 923 Type (Doctor Yellow sets T4, T5)
- 925 Type (Doctor Yellow sets S1, S2)
- E926 Type (East i)
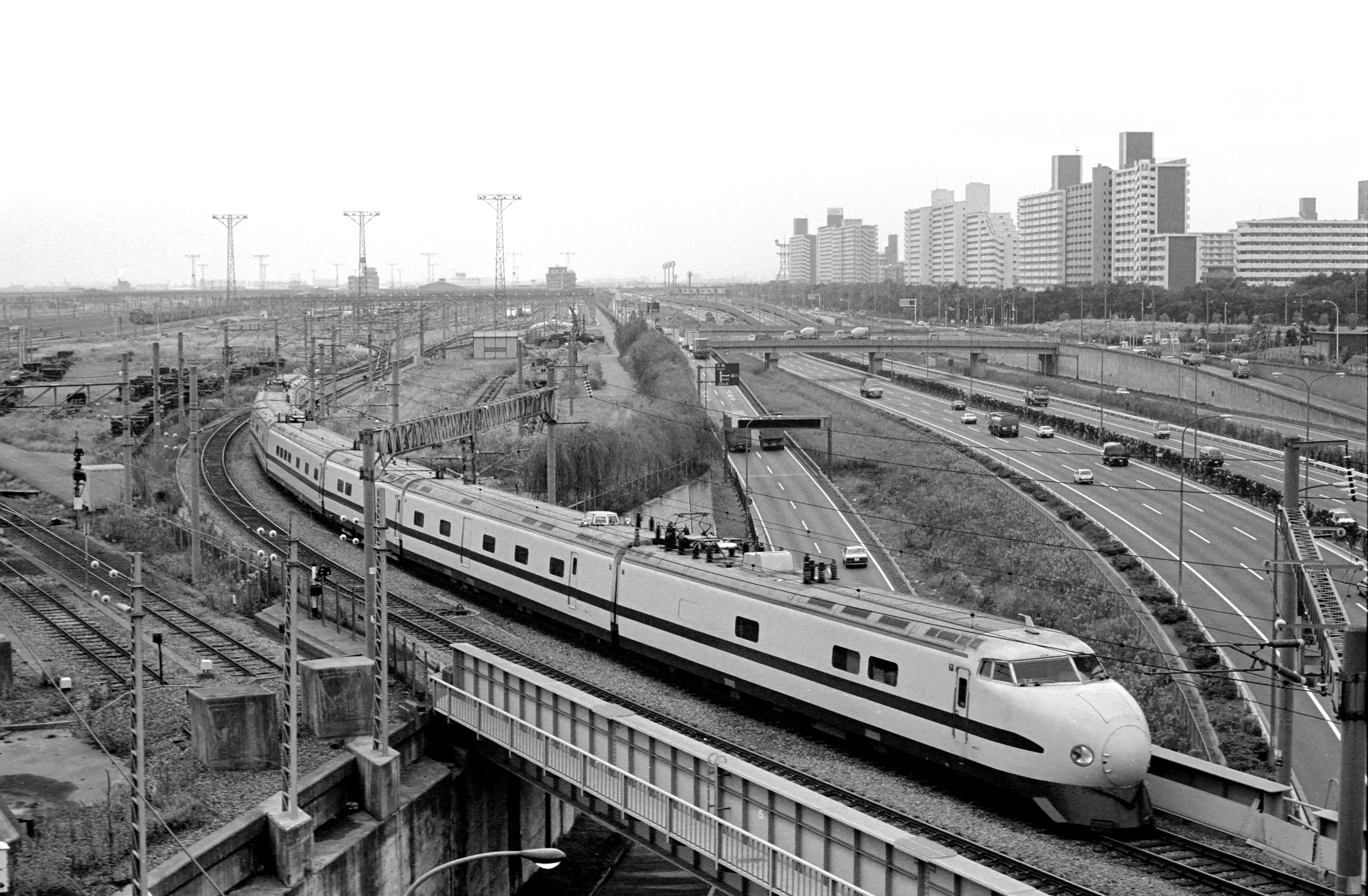
Doctor Yellow Type 922

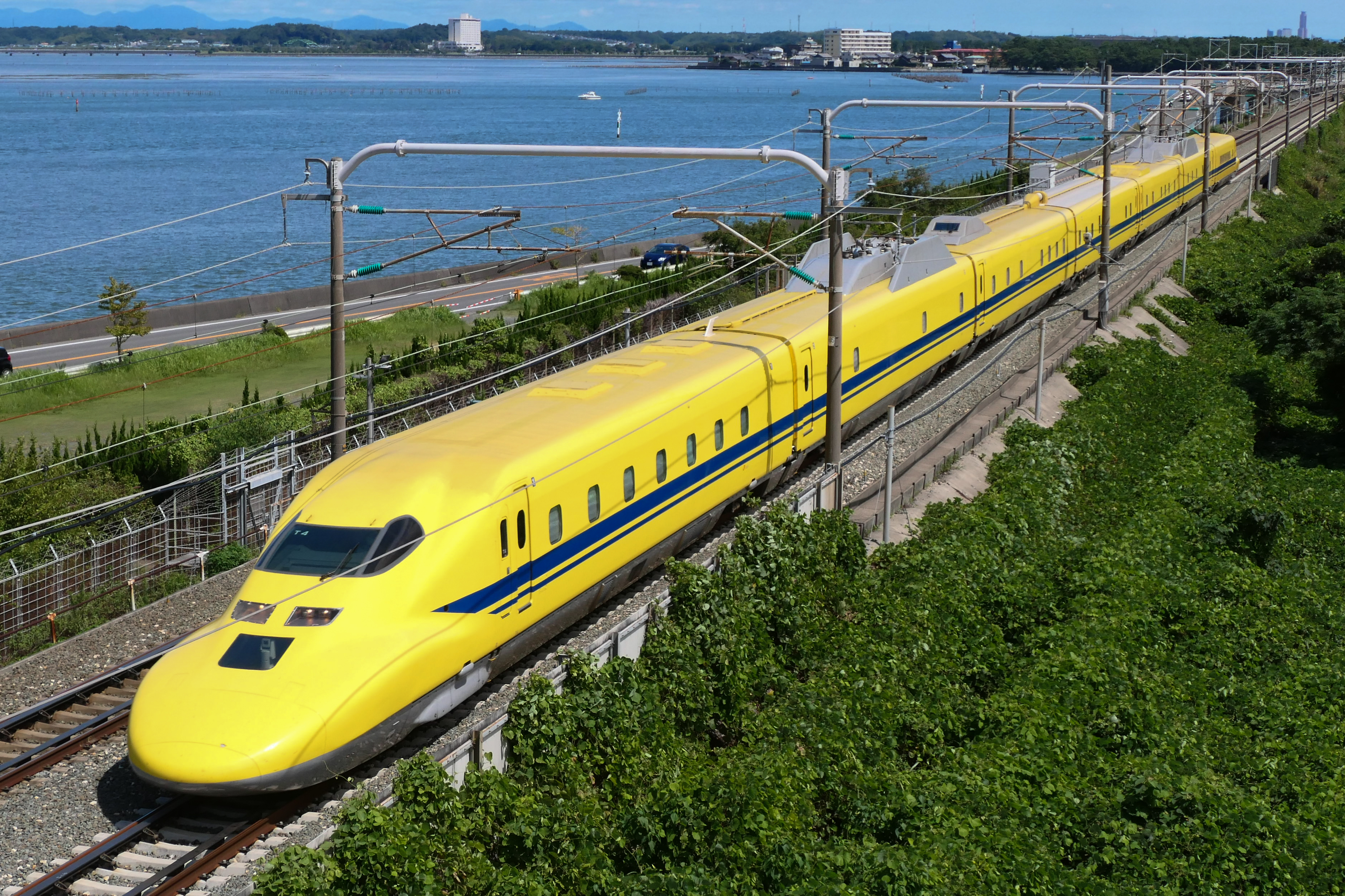
Doctor Yellow Type 923

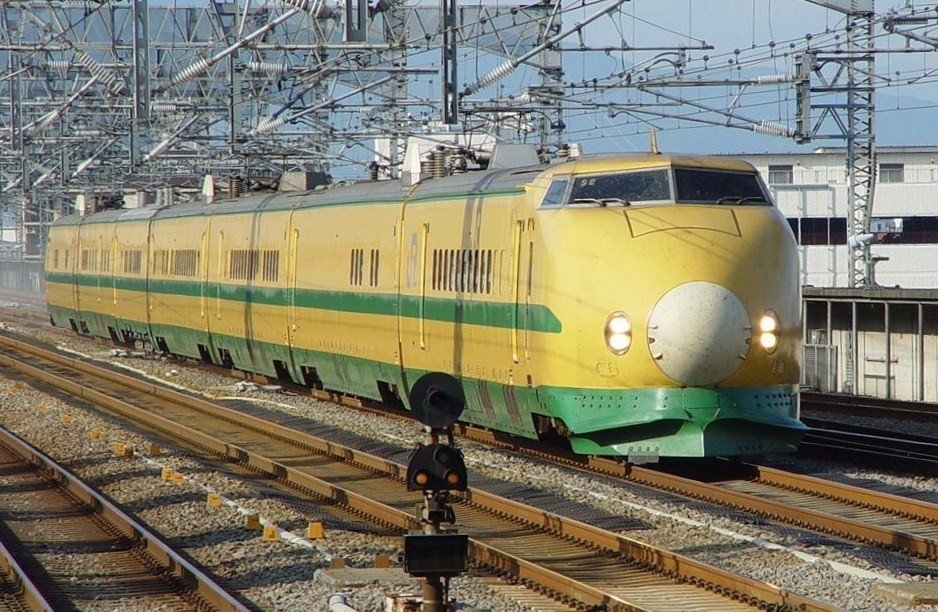
Doctor Yellow Type 925

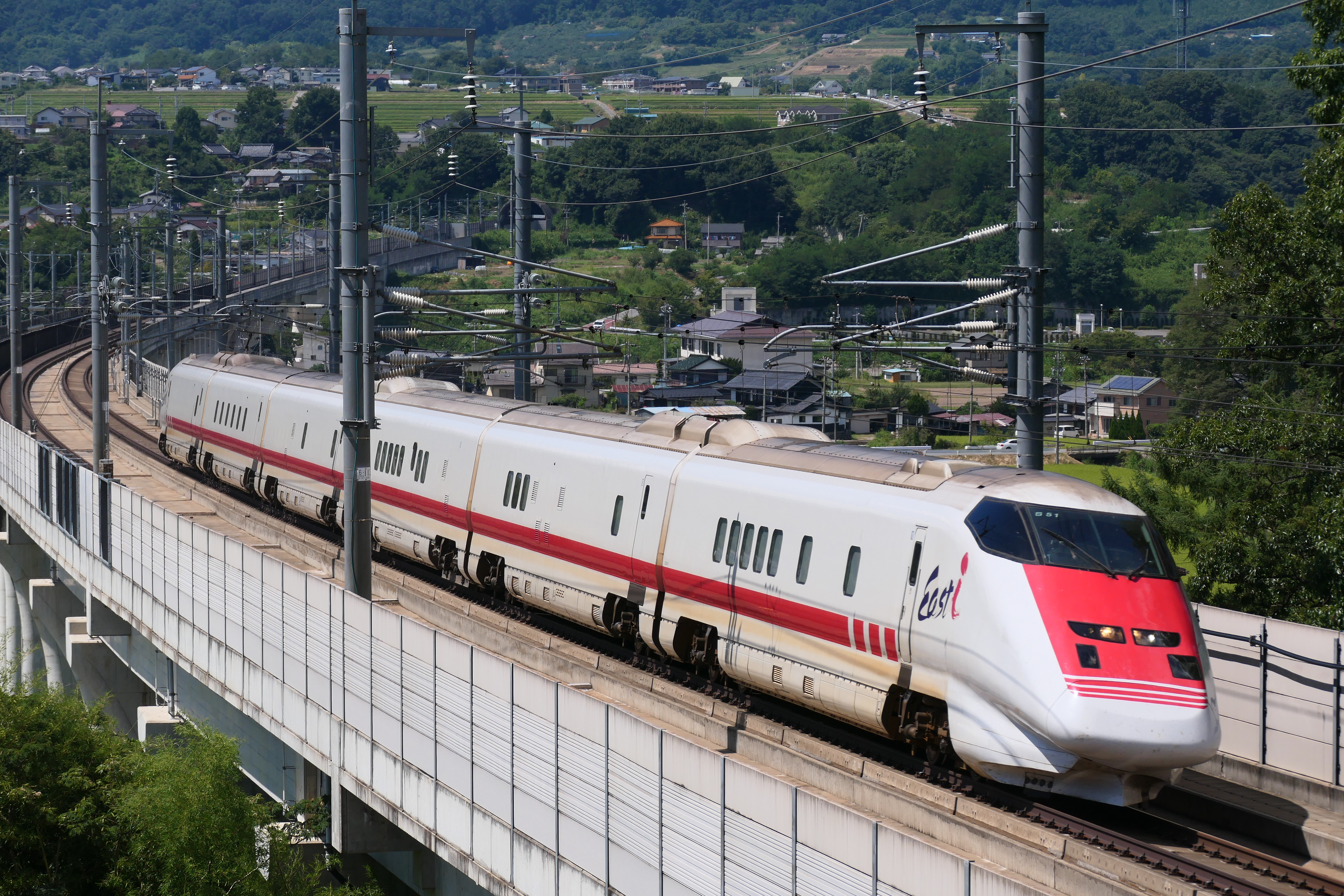
Type E926 East-i

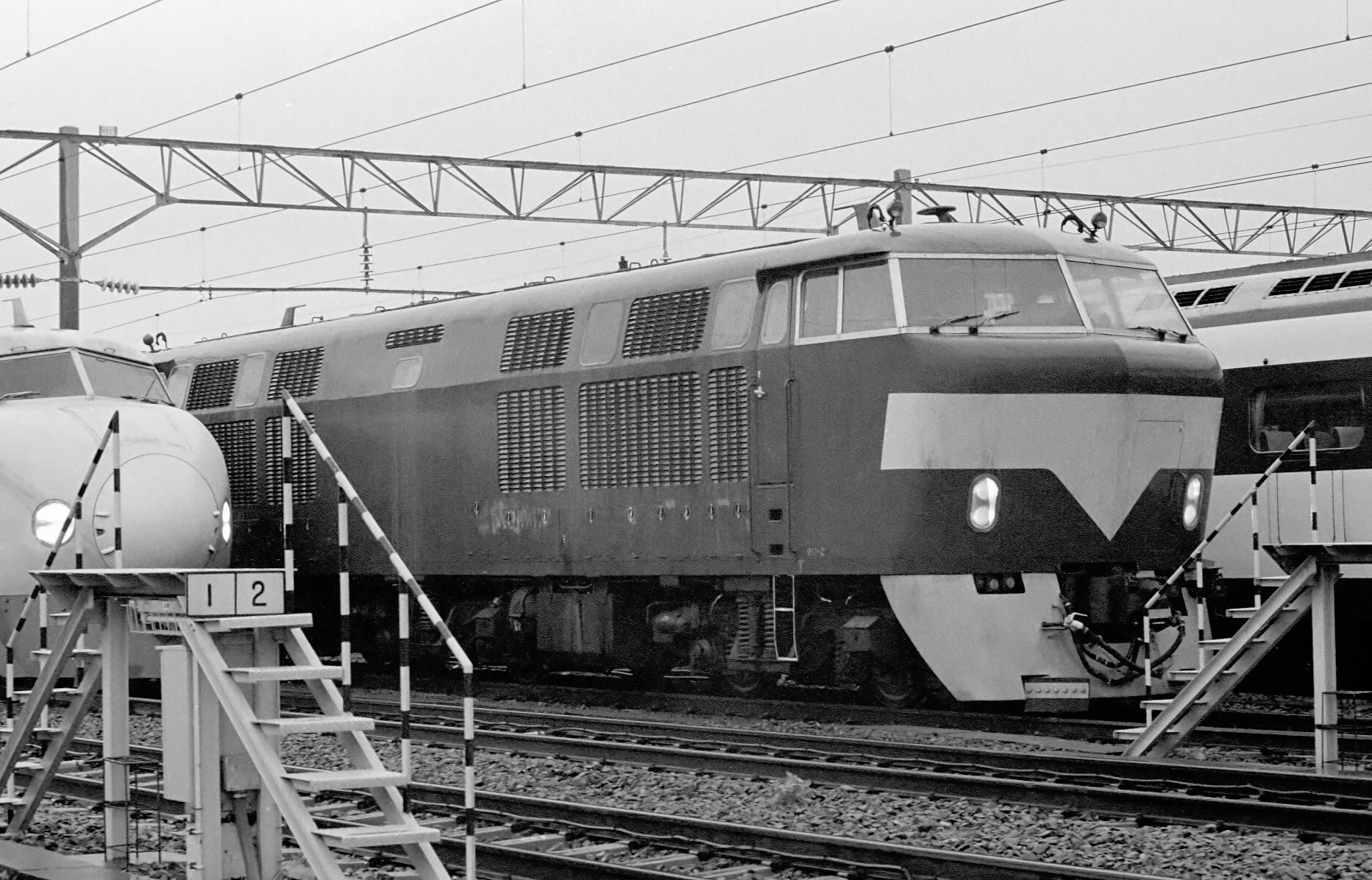
Type 911 locomotive

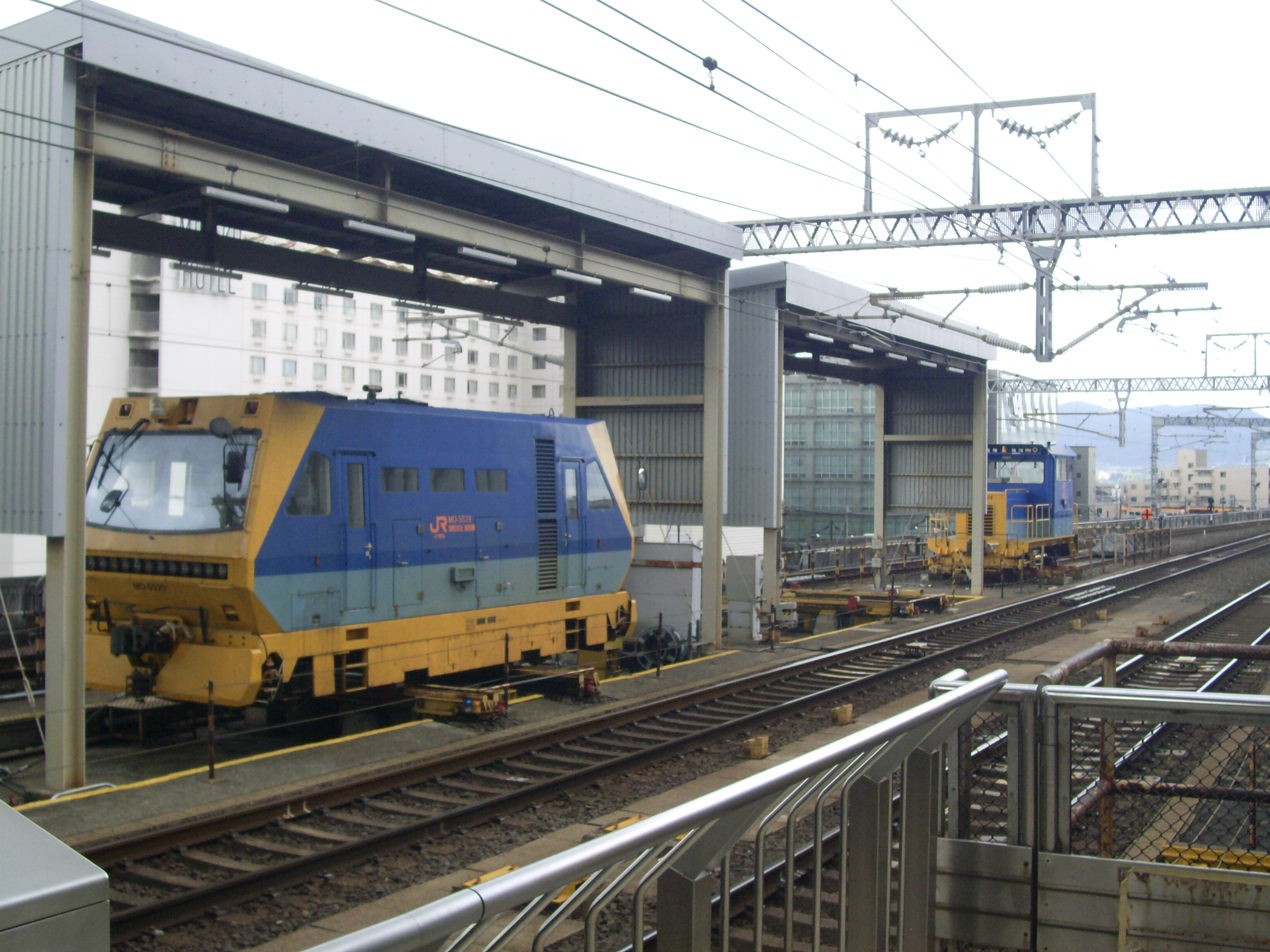
Track maintenance vehicles stabled along sidings outside Kyoto station

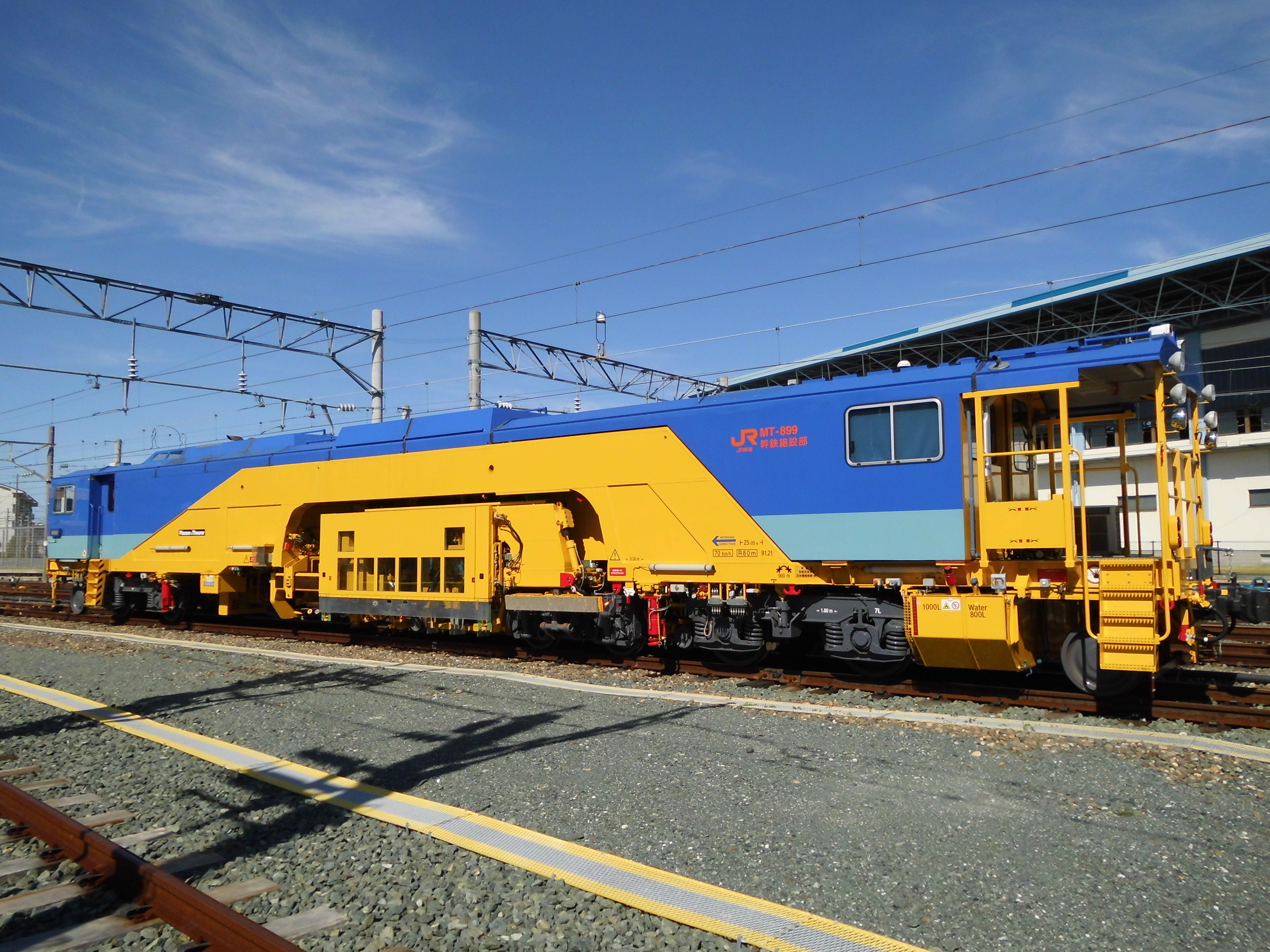
Tamping machine

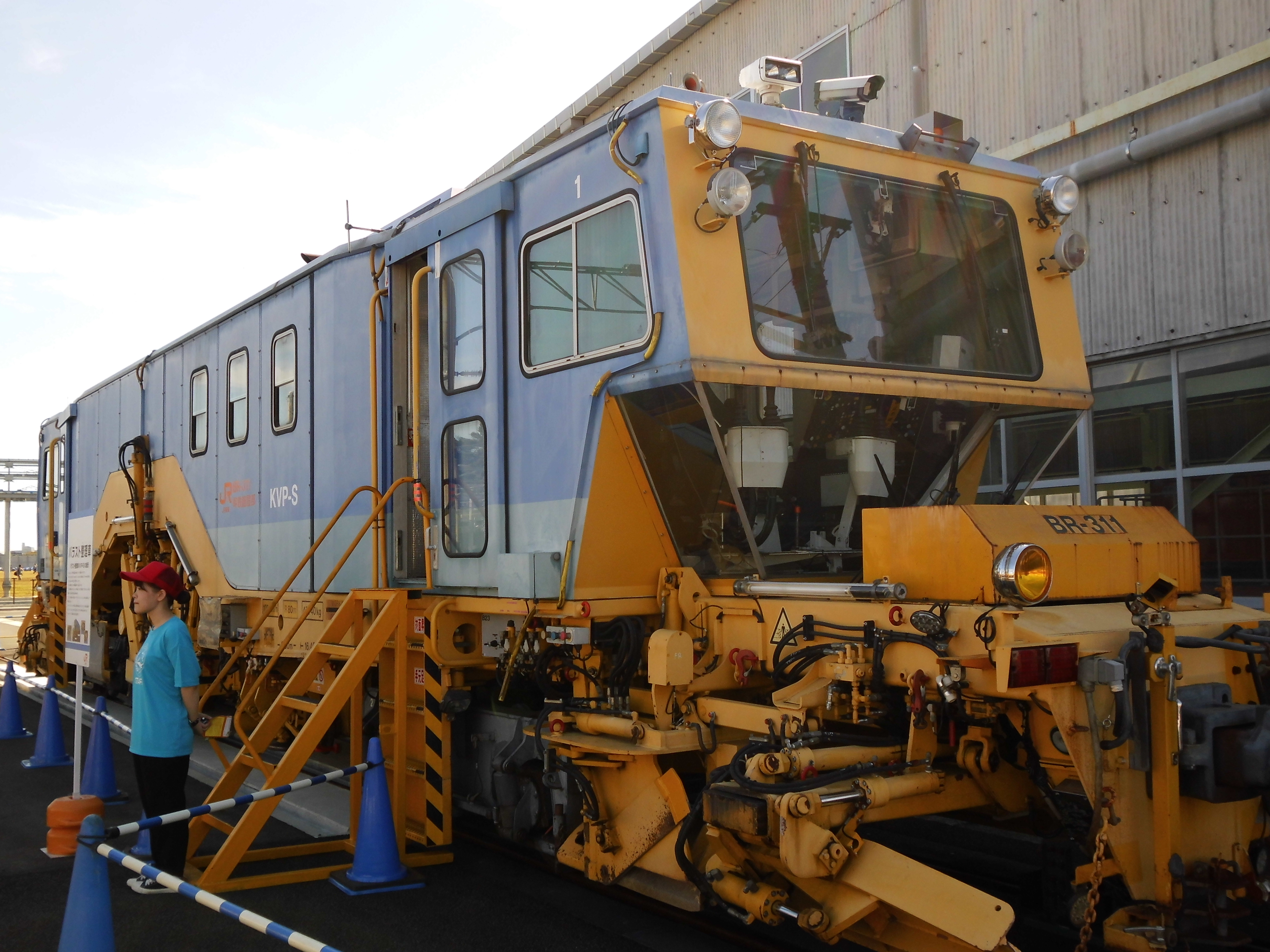
Ballast cleaner

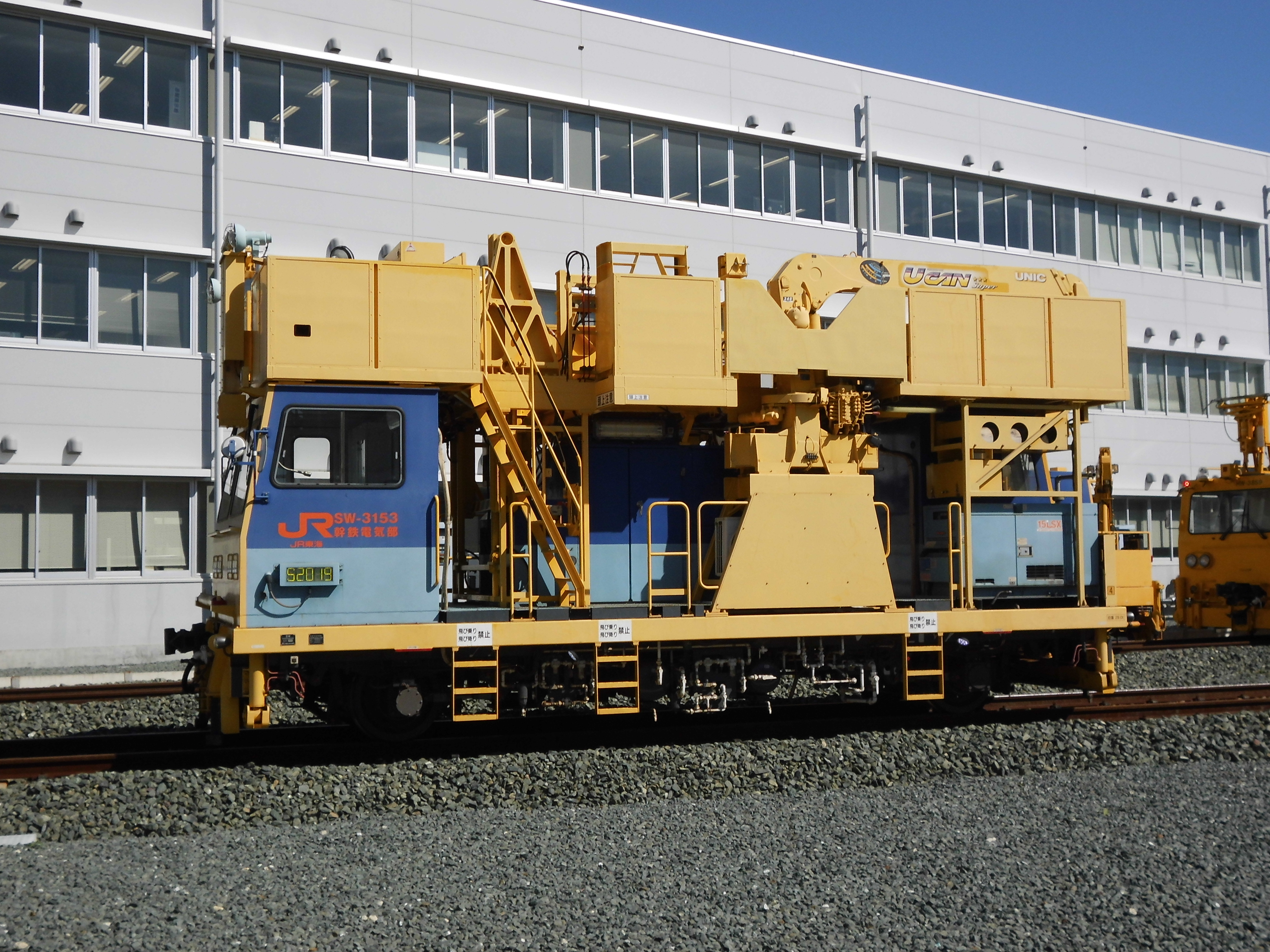
Overhead line replacement vehicle

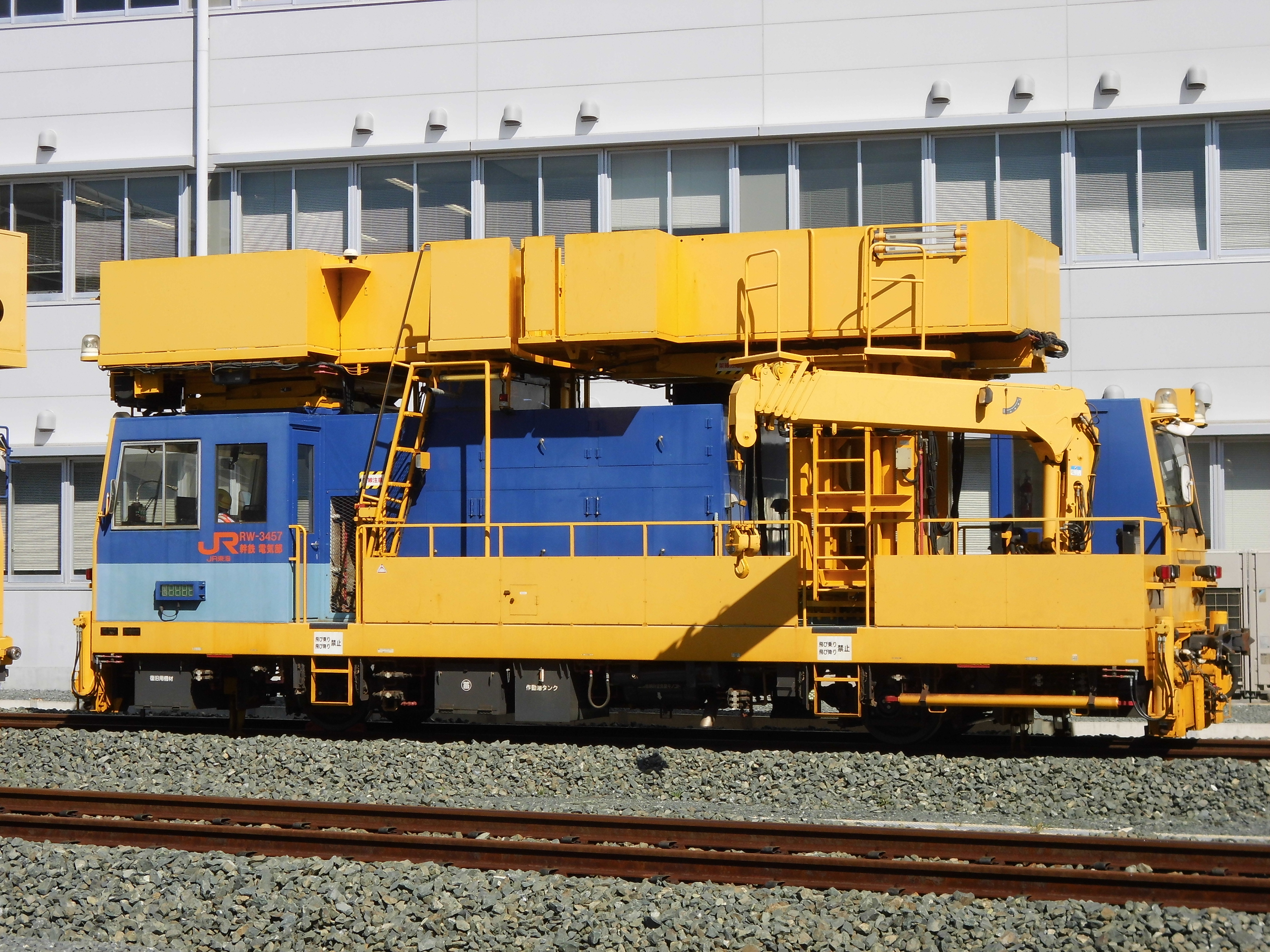
Loading vehicle

== Speed records ==
=== Traditional rail ===
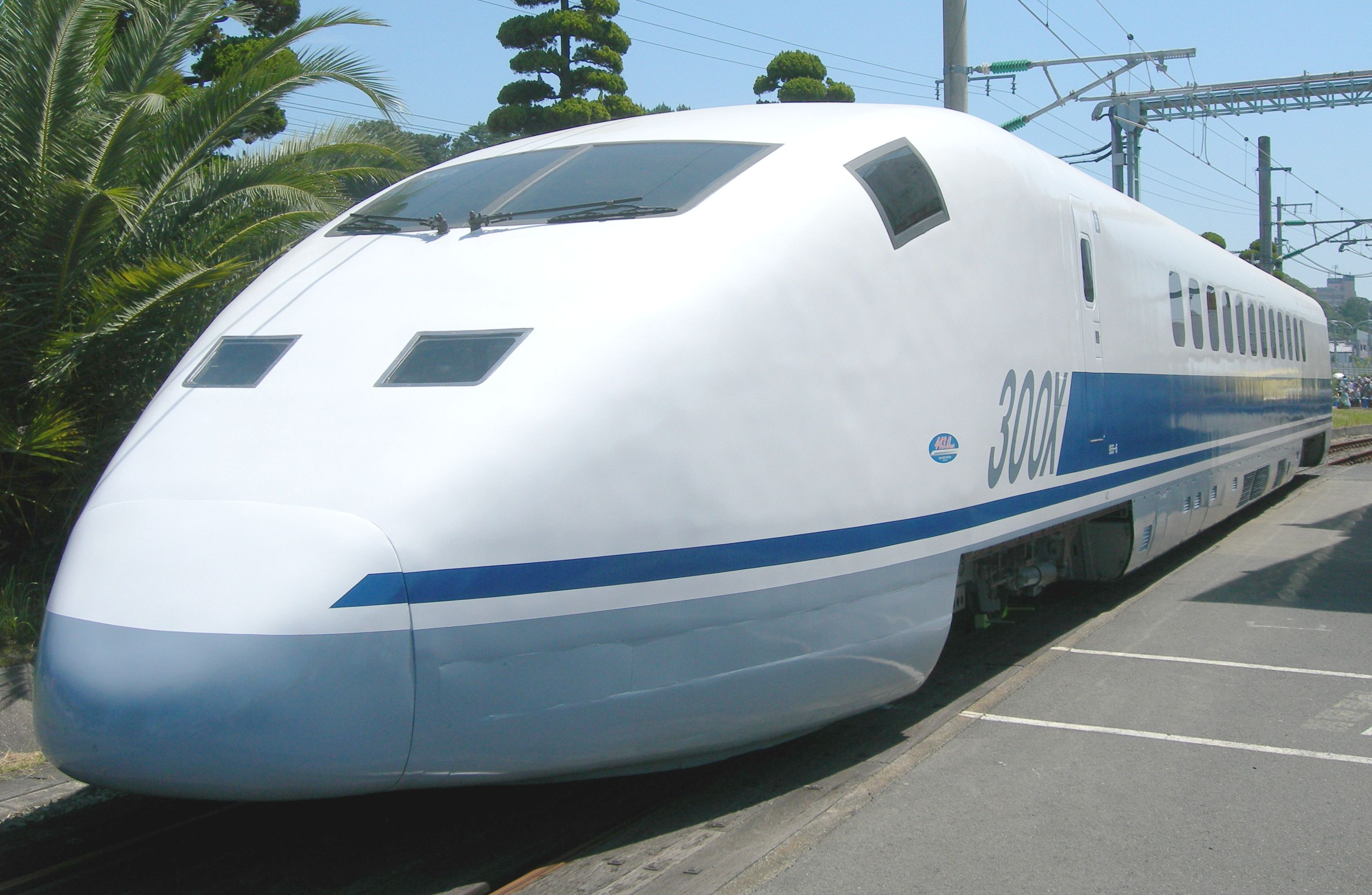
Class 955 "300X"

Speed		Train	Location	Date	Comments
km/h	mph	Train	Location	Date	Comments
200	124	Class 1000 Shinkansen	Kamonomiya test track in Odawara, part of Tōkaidō Shinkansen	31 October 1962	
256	159	Class 1000 Shinkansen	Kamonomiya test track	30 March 1963	Former world speed record for EMU trains.
286	178	Class 951 Shinkansen	San'yō Shinkansen	24 February 1972	Former world speed record for EMU trains.
319	198	Class 961 Shinkansen	Oyama test track, part of Tōhoku Shinkansen	7 December 1979	Former world speed record for EMU trains.
326	203	300 series	Tōkaidō Shinkansen	28 February 1991	
336	209	400 series	Jōetsu Shinkansen	26 March 1991	
345	214	400 series	Jōetsu Shinkansen	19 September 1991	
346	215	500-900 series "WIN350"	San'yō Shinkansen	6 August 1992	
350	217	500–900 series "WIN350"	San'yō Shinkansen	8 August 1992	
352	219	Class 952/953 "STAR21"	Jōetsu Shinkansen	30 October 1992	
425	264	Class 952/953 "STAR21"	Jōetsu Shinkansen	21 December 1993	
427	265	Class 955 "300X"	Tōkaidō Shinkansen	11 July 1996	
443	275	Class 955 "300X"	Tōkaidō Shinkansen	26 July 1996	

=== Maglev ===
L0 Series

Speed		Train	Location	Date	Comments
km/h	mph	Train	Location	Date	Comments
531	330	MLX01	Yamanashi Maglev Test Line (part of the Chūō Shinkansen)	12 December 1997	Three-car train set. Former world speed record for all trains.
552	343	MLX01	Yamanashi Maglev Test Line (part of the Chūō Shinkansen)	14 April 1999	Five-car train set. Former world speed record for all trains.
581	361	MLX01	Yamanashi Maglev Test Line (part of the Chūō Shinkansen)	2 December 2003	Three-car train set. Former world speed record for all trains.
590	367	L0 series	Yamanashi Maglev Test Line (part of the Chūō Shinkansen)	16 April 2015	Seven-car train set. Former world speed record for all trains.
603	375	L0 series	Yamanashi Maglev Test Line (part of the Chūō Shinkansen)	21 April 2015	Seven-car train set. Current world speed record for all trains.

== Reliability ==
=== Punctuality ===
The Shinkansen is very reliable thanks to several factors, including its near-total separation from slower traffic. In 2016, JR Central reported that the Shinkansen's average delay from schedule per train was 24 seconds. This includes delays due to uncontrollable causes, such as natural disasters.

=== Safety record ===
Over the Shinkansen's 60-plus year history, carrying over 10 billion passengers, there have been no passenger fatalities due to train accidents such as derailments or collisions, despite frequent earthquakes and typhoons. Injuries and a single fatality have been caused by doors closing on passengers or their belongings; attendants are employed at platforms to prevent such accidents. There have, however, been suicides by passengers jumping both from and in front of moving trains.

There have been two derailments of Shinkansen trains in passenger service. The first one occurred during the Chūetsu earthquake on 23 October 2004. Eight of ten cars of the Toki No. 325 train on the Jōetsu Shinkansen derailed near Nagaoka Station in Nagaoka, Niigata. There were no casualties among the 154 passengers.

Another derailment happened on 2 March 2013 on the Akita Shinkansen when the Komachi No. 25 train derailed in blizzard conditions in Daisen, Akita. No passengers were injured.

In the event of an earthquake, an earthquake detection system can bring the train to a stop very quickly; newer trainsets are lighter and have stronger braking systems, allowing for quicker stopping. New anti-derailment devices were installed on tracks after analysis of the Jōetsu derailment.

Kobe Steel is one of the suppliers of high-strength steel for Shinkansen trainsets and, during inspections following the Kobe Steel data falsification scandal, cracks were found in a single bogie which was then removed from service on 11 December 2017.

On 23 January 2024, a massive power outage struck the Tohoku, Hokuriku and Joetsu Shinkansen lines, resulting in the cancellation of 283 trains and affecting about 120,000 passengers. JR East said that the outage was caused by a Kagayaki service train touching an overhead power cable which was left dangling after the metal rod supporting it fractured between Omiya Station in Saitama and Ueno Station in Tokyo. The incident damaged the train's pantographs and a window, while two railway employees were hospitalized following an explosion that occurred at the site during repairs. Most Shinkansen services were restored the following morning.

In September 2024 and March 2025, two decoupling incidents took place on trains servicing the Tohoku line.

On 15 August 2025, a burning smell was noticed by crew members aboard a Kodama service of the Tokaido Shinkansen. At the time, the N700S set was travelling between Maibara and Gifu-Hashima station, where the train was stopped and white smoke was found coming from underneath car number 9. The fire department was called, and identified a fire on the underside of the vehicle. There were no reported injuries, but the 250 passengers were forced to disembark and take a later Nozomi service.

== Effects ==
=== Economics ===
The Shinkansen has had a significant beneficial effect on Japan's business, economy, society, environment and culture beyond mere construction and operational contributions. The resultant time savings alone from switching from a conventional to a high-speed network have been estimated at 400 million hours, and the system has an economic contribution of ¥500 billion per year. That does not include the savings from reduced reliance on imported fuel, which also has national security benefits. Shinkansen lines, particularly in the very crowded coastal Taiheiyō Belt megalopolis, met two primary goals:

- Shinkansen trains reduced the congestion burden on regional transportation by increasing throughput on a minimal land footprint, therefore being economically preferable compared to modes (such as airports or highways) common in less densely populated regions of the world.
- As rail was already the primary urban mode of passenger travel, from that perspective it was akin to a sunk cost; there was not a significant number of motorists to convince to switch modes. The initial megalopolitan Shinkansen lines were profitable and paid for themselves. Connectivity rejuvenated rural towns such as Kakegawa that would otherwise be too distant from major cities.

However, upon the introduction of the 1973 Basic Plan the initial prudence in developing Shinkansen lines gave way to political considerations to extend the mode to far less populated regions of the country, partly to spread these benefits beyond the key centres of Kanto and Kinki. Although in some cases regional extension was frustrated by protracted land acquisition (sometimes influenced by the cancellation of the Narita Shinkansen following fierce protests by locals), over time Shinkansen lines were built to relatively sparsely populated areas with the intent to disperse the population away from the capital.

Such expansion had a significant cost. JNR, the national railway company, was already burdened with subsidizing unprofitable rural and regional railways. It then assumed Shinkansen construction debt until the government corporation eventually owed some ¥28 trillion, contributing to it being regionalised and privatized in 1987. The privatized JRs eventually paid ¥9.2 trillion to acquire JNR's Shinkansen network.

Following privatization, the JR group of companies have continued Shinkansen network expansion to less populated areas, but with far more flexibility to spin-off unprofitable railways or cut costs than in JNR days. An important factor is the post bubble zero interest-rate policy that allows JR to borrow huge sums of capital without significant concern regarding repayment timing.

A UCLA study found that the presence of a Shinkansen line had improved housing affordability by making it more realistic for lower-income city workers to live in exurban areas much further away from the city, which tend to have cheaper housing options. That in turn helps the city to "decentralise" and reduce city property prices.

=== Environment ===
Traveling by the Tokaido Shinkansen from Tokyo to Osaka produces only around 16% of the carbon dioxide of the equivalent journey by car, a saving of 15,000 tons of CO_{2} per year.

== Challenges ==
=== Noise pollution ===
Noise pollution concerns have made increasing speed more difficult. In Japan, population density is high and there have been strong protests against the Shinkansen's noise pollution. Its noise is thus limited to less than 70 dB in residential areas. Improvement and reduction of the pantograph, weight saving of cars, and construction of noise barriers and other measures have been implemented. Research is primarily aimed at reducing operational noise, particularly the tunnel boom phenomenon caused when trains transit tunnels at high speed.

=== Earthquake ===
Because of the risk of earthquakes in Japan, the Urgent Earthquake Detection and Alarm System (UrEDAS) (an earthquake warning system) was introduced in 1992. It enables automatic braking of Shinkansen trains in the event of large earthquakes.

=== Heavy snow ===
The Tōkaidō Shinkansen often experiences heavy snow in the area around Maibara Station between December and February, requiring trains to reduce speed thus disrupting the timetable. Snow-dispersing sprinkler systems have been installed, but delays of 10–20 minutes still occur during snowy weather. Snow-related treefalls have also caused service interruptions. Along the Jōetsu Shinkansen route, snow can be very heavy, with depths of two to three metres; the line is equipped with stronger sprinklers and slab track to mitigate the snow's effects. Despite having multiple days with delays longer than 30 minutes, the Tōhoku Shinkansen still presents a slight advantage in reliability compared to air travel on days with significant snowfall.

== Ridership ==
=== Annual ===
Annual ridership figures for selected years (in millions of passengers)
	Tokaido	Tohoku	San'yō	Joetsu	Nagano (Hokuriku)	Kyushu	Hokkaido	Total*	Total (excl. transfers)
FY2007	151.32	84.83	64.43	38.29	10.13	4.18	—	353.18	315.77
FY2015	162.97	90.45	72.06	42.96	31.84	13.65	**0.10	414.03	365.71
FY2016	167.72	91.09	72.53	43.06	30.75	13.27	2.11	420.53	
FY2017	170.09	91.98	74.46	43.80	31.03	14.24	2.19	427.78	
FY2018	174.11	93.44	75.92	44.53	31.76	14.6	1.64	436.00	
FY2023	160.71	81.55	70.30	39.78	30.31	16.09	1.40	356.45	
FY2024	170.52	87.05	73.86	44.05	41.39	17.02	1.62	385.93	

* The sum of the ridership of individual lines does not equal the ridership of the system because a single rider may be counted multiple times when using multiple lines, to get proper ridership figures for a system, in the above case, is only counted once.

** Only refers to 6 days of operation: 26 March 2016 (opening date) to 31 March 2016 (end of FY2015).

Until 2011, Japan's high-speed rail system had the highest annual patronage of any system worldwide, when China's HSR network's patronage reached 1.7 billion and became the world's highest.

=== Cumulative comparison ===
Cumulative high-speed rail passengers (in millions of passengers)
Year	Shinkansen (see notes)	Asia (other)	Europe	World	Shinkansen share (%)
1964	11.0	0	0	11.0	100%
1980	1,616.3	0	0	1,616.3	100%
1985	2,390.3	0	45.7	2,436.0	98.1%
1990	3,559.1	0	129.9	3,689.0	96.5%
1995	5,018.0	0	461	5,479	91.6%
2000	6,531.7	0	1,103.5	7,635.1	85.5%
2005	8,088.3	52.2	2,014.6	10,155.1	79.6%
2010	9,651.0	965	3,177.0	15,417	70.8%
2012	10,344	2,230	3,715	16,210	64.5%
2014	11,050	3,910	4,300	19,260	57.4%

Notes:

- Data in italics includes extrapolated estimations where data is missing. Turkey and Russia data here is included in "Europe" column, rather than split between Asia and Europe. Only systems with 200 km/h or higher regular service speed are considered.
- "Shinkansen share (%)" refers to percent of Shinkansen ridership (including fully assembled exported trainsets) as a percent of "World" total. Currently this only pertains to Taiwan, but may change if Japan exports Shinkansen to other nations.
- "Shinkansen" column does not include Shinkansen knock down kits made in Japan exported to China for assembly, or any derivative system thereof in China
- "Asia (other)" column refers to sum of riderships of all HSR systems geographically in Asia that do not use Shinkansen. (this data excludes Russia and Turkey, which geographically have parts in Asia but for sake of convenience included in Europe column)
- For 2013, Japan's Ministry of Transport has not updated data, nor is summed European data available (even 2012 data is very rough), however Taiwan ridership is 47.49 million and Korea with 54.5 million and China with 672 million in 2013.

Cumulative ridership since October 1964 is over 5 billion passengers for the Tokaido Shinkansen Line alone and 10 billion passengers for Japan's entire shinkansen network. Nevertheless, China's share is increasing fast, as close to 9.5 billion passengers in that nation have been served by the end of 2018 and is projected to pass Japan's cumulative numbers by as early as 2020.

=== Passenger-kilometres ===
^{†} Indicates that multiple sources are available, and report different values (Note: The data in and have been used instead of when applicable.)

Annual passenger-kilometres on the Shinkansen network for selected years (in billions of passengers-kilometres)
Fiscal year (Note: Fiscal year begins 1 April and ends 31 March. The fiscal year is numbered by the calendar year in which it begins, e.g. FY 1964 spans 1 April 1964 to 31 March 1965.)	1964	1970	1980	1990	2000	2010	2019	2020	2021	2022	2023	2024
Tokaido	3.9	27.9	41.8	41.3	39.7	43.7	54.0	18.2†	25.2†	42.4†	52.8†	55.2†
Sanyo			41.8	16.1	-	-	-	7.2	9.1	15.2	18.7	19.1
Tohoku				10.7	12.3	12.6	15.5	5.4	6.9	11.0	14.4	15.0
Joetsu				4.1	4.6	4.3	4.8	1.8	2.4	3.7	4.6	5.0
Hokuriku					0.81	0.75	3.5	1.3	1.7	2.9	3.6	5.3
Kyushu						0.49	2.0	0.87†	0.98	1.5	2.0	2.0
Hokkaido							0.25	0.08	0.09	0.17	0.24	0.25
Total	3.9	27.9	41.8	72.2	71.2	77.4	99.3	34.8	46.4	76.9	96.3	99.4

Annual passenger-kilometres on the Shinkansen network
from 1964 to 2024 (in millions of passengers-kilometres)

^{†} Indicates that multiple sources are available, and report different values

Fiscal Year	Total	Tokaido	Sanyo	Tohoku	Joetsu	Hokuriku	Kyushu	Hokkaido
1964	3,912	3,912						
1965	10,651	10,651						
1966	14,489	14,489						
1967	17,991	17,991						
1968	21,027	21,027						
1969	22,816	22,816						
1970	27,890	27,890						
1971	26,795	26,795						
1972	33,835	33,835						
1973	38,990	38,990						
1974	40,671	40,671						
1975	53,318	53,318						
1976	48,149	48,149						
1977	42,187	42,187						
1978	41,074	41,074						
1979	40,986	40,986						
1980	41,790	41,790						
1981	41,717	41,717						
1982	46,105	41,489		3,743	873			
1983	50,440	42,186		5,989	2,265			
1984	50,826	42,197		6,174	2,455			
1985	55,423	43,864		8,393	3,166			
1986	55,943	44,230		8,525	3,188			
1987	57,414	32,123	13,153	8,929	3,209			
1988	64,351	36,299	14,792	9,677	3,583			
1989	65,965	37,404	15,002	9,892	3,666			
1990	72,173	41,341	16,064	10,678	4,089			
1991	74,220	41,841	16,278	11,689	4,413			
1992	73,060	40,655	16,161	11,837	4,408			
1993	72,563	40,504	-	11,695	4,339			
1994	68,248	38,907	-	11,763	4,267			
1995	70,827	39,817	-	11,956	4,295			
1996	72,948	40,973	-	12,165	4,354			
1997	73,213	41,090	-	12,278	4,400			
1998	71,019	39,407	-	12,071	4,589	795		
1999	70,035	38,878	-	12,146	4,589	799		
2000	71,153	39,670	-	12,297	4,575	806		
2001	72,317	40,573	-	12,277	4,648	816		
2002	71,538	39,589	-	12,802	4,661	813		
2003	73,030	40,340	-	13,275	4,645	827	32	
2004	74,670	41,556	-	13,356	4,233	802	410	
2005	77,902	43,777	-	13,484	4,590	800	403	
2006	79,440	44,487	-	13,884	4,675	816	414	
2007	82,825	46,540	-	14,281	4,812	832	428	
2008	81,659	46,044	-	13,779	4,704	820	425	
2009	76,040	42,685	-	12,945	4,432	775	384	
2010	77,426	43,741	-	12,594	4,303	753	489	
2011	-	44,303	-	-	-	-	-	
2012	-	46,930	-	-	-	-	-	
2013	89,178	48,873	-	15,334	4,706	823	1,825	
2014	91,021	50,134	-	15,130	4,830	1,039	1,863	
2015	97,405	52,166	-	15,536	4,913	3,888	1,929	14
2016	98,592	52,909	-	15,918	4,941	3,712	1,852	306
2017	101,401	54,756	-	16,014	5,025	3,720	2,005	245
2018	103,653	56,277	-	16,224	5,125	3,807	2,032	266
2019	99,343	54,009	-	15,490	4,825	3,494	1,950	252
2020	34,815	18,199^{†}	7,212	5,356	1,775	1,326	868^{†}	79
2021	46,373	25,176^{†}	9,119	6,898	2,393	1,720	978	89
2022	76,892	42,418^{†}	15,240	10,980	3,695	2,874	1,517	168
2023	96,260	52,751^{†}	18,723	14,407	4,577	3,610	1,952	239
2024	99,406	55,210^{†}	19,114	14,989	5,021	5,262	2,023	246

== Future ==
=== Speed increases ===
==== Tōhoku Shinkansen ====
E5 series trains, capable of up to 320 km/h (200 mph), initially limited to 300 km/h (186 mph), were introduced on the Tōhoku Shinkansen in March 2011. Operation at the maximum speed of 320 km/h (200 mph) between Utsunomiya and Morioka on this route commenced on 16 March 2013. It reduced the journey time to around 3 hours for trains from Tokyo to Shin-Aomori, a distance of 674 km (419 mi).

Extensive trials using the Fastech 360 test trains have shown that operation at 360 km/h (224 mph) is not feasible because of problems of noise pollution (particularly tunnel boom), overhead wire wear, and braking distances. On 30 October 2012, JR East announced that it was pursuing research and development to increase speeds to 360 km/h (224 mph) on the Tohoku Shinkansen by 2020. The ALFA-X is undergoing testing.

==== Hokkaido Shinkansen ====
Upon commencement of services in 2016, the maximum speed on the approximately 82 km (51 mi) dual gauge section of the Hokkaido Shinkansen (including through the 54 km (34 mi) Seikan Tunnel) was 140 km/h (85 mph). From March 2019, the maximum speed on the Seikan Tunnel was increased to 160 km/h (100 mph). There are approximately 50 freight trains using the dual gauge section each day, so limiting the travel of such trains to times outside of Shinkansen services is not an option. Because of this and other weather-related factors cited by JR East and JR Hokkaido, the fastest journey time between Tokyo and Shin-Hakodate-Hokuto is 3 hours, 57 minutes.

During the 2020–21 New Year Holiday period, certain Shinkansen services were operated at 210 km/h (130 mph) on the Seikan Tunnel and was proposed again for the Golden Week Holiday period from 3–6 May 2021, due to fewer freight trains operating. During the 2024 Golden Week Holiday period, the maximum speed in the Seikan Tunnel was increased to 260 km/h (160 mph). Besides the holiday periods, the maximum speed in the Seikan Tunnel is 160 km/h (100 mph), and 140 km/h (85 mph) in the remaining dual gauge section as of 2024.

From 2028, the maximum speed in the entire dual gauge section is planned to be increased to 260 km during holiday periods.

To achieve the full benefit of Shinkansen trains travelling on the dual gauge section at 260 km/h (160 mph) (the maximum speed proposed through the tunnel), alternatives are being considered, such as a system to automatically slow Shinkansen trains to 200 km/h (125 mph) when passing narrow-gauge trains, and/or loading freight trains onto special "Train on Train" standard-gauge trains (akin to a covered piggyback flatcar train) built to withstand the shock wave of oncoming Shinkansen trains traveling at full speed. This would enable a travel time from Tokyo to Shin-Hakodate-Hokuto of 3 hours and 45 minutes, a saving of 12 minutes.

=== Extensions ===
==== Hokuriku Shinkansen ====
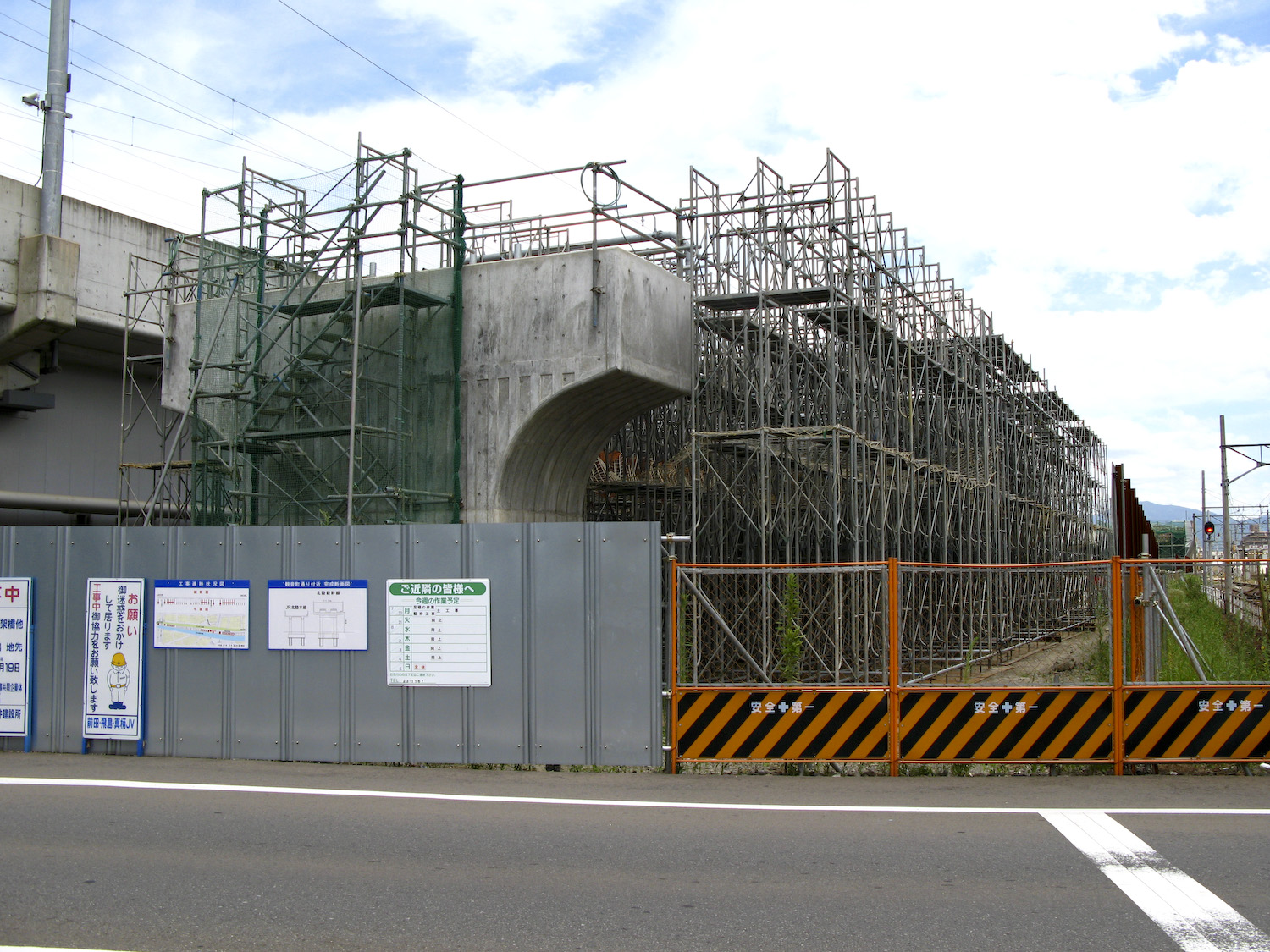
Construction of the Hokuriku Shinkansen in Fukui

The Hokuriku Shinkansen was extended from Kanazawa to Tsuruga on 16 March 2024.

There are further plans to extend the line from Tsuruga to Osaka, with the Obama-Kyoto route chosen by the government on 20 December 2016, after a government committee investigated the five nominated routes.

Construction of the extension beyond Tsuruga is not expected to commence before 2030, with a projected 15-year construction period. On 6 March 2017 the government committee announced the chosen route from Kyoto to Shin-Osaka is to be via Kyotanabe, with a station at Matsuiyamate on the Katamachi Line.

In July 2026, Katsuragawa was selected as the location for the Hokuriku Shinkansen's Kyoto station.

==== Hokkaido Shinkansen ====
The Hokkaido Shinkansen forms an extension of the Tohoku Shinkansen north of Shin-Aomori to Shin-Hakodate-Hokuto Station (north of the Hokkaido city of Hakodate) through the Seikan Tunnel, which was converted to dual gauge as part of the project, opening in March 2016.

JR Hokkaido is extending the Hokkaido Shinkansen from Shin-Hakodate-Hokuto to Sapporo to open by 2038. The 211.3 km (131.3 mi) extension will be approximately 76% in tunnels, including major tunnels such as Toshima (~32.675 km (20.303 mi)) Oshima (~26.5 km (16.5 mi)), Teine (~26.5 km (16.5 mi)) and Shiribeshi (~18 km (11 mi)).

==== Nishi Kyushu Shinkansen ====
JR Kyushu opened the Nishi Kyushu Shinkansen from Takeo-Onsen to Nagasaki (built to full Shinkansen standard) on 23 September 2022.

This proposal initially involved introducing Gauge Change Trains (GCT) travelling from Hakata to Shin-Tosu (26.3 km (16.3 mi)) on the existing Kyushu Shinkansen line, then passing through a specific gauge changing (standard to narrow) section of track linking to the existing Nagasaki Main Line, along which it would travel to Hizen Yamaguchi (37.6 km (23.4 mi)), then onto the Sasebo Line to Takeo-Onsen (13.7 km (8.5 mi)), where another gauge changing section (narrow to standard) would lead onto the final Shinkansen line to Nagasaki (66 km (41 mi)). However, significant technical issues with the axles of the GCT resulted in its cancellation.

The Shinkansen line shortens the distance between Hakata and Nagasaki by 6.2% (9.6 km (6.0 mi)), and while only 64% of the route is built to full Shinkansen standards, it eliminated the slowest sections of the previous narrow-gauge route. At Takeo Onsen station, a 'cross platform' change is available for a relay service connecting to Hakata.

As part of the GCT proposal, the 12.8 km (8.0 mi) section of single track between Hizen Yamaguchi and Takeo Onsen was proposed to be duplicated. However, due to the issues with the development of the GCT, the proposal did not advance.

The Nishi Kyushu Shinkansen's route for the section east of Takeo-Onsen toward Shin-Tosu has not been finalized, and construction has not begun.

=== Maglev (Chūō Shinkansen) ===
Maglev trains have been undertaking test runs on the Yamanashi test track since 1997, running at speeds of over 500 km/h (310 mph). As a result of this extensive testing, maglev technology is almost ready for public usage. An extension of the test track from 18.4 to 42.8 km (11.4 to 26.6 mi) was completed in June 2013, enabling extended high-speed running trials to commence in August 2013. This section will be incorporated into the Chūō Shinkansen which will eventually link Tokyo to Osaka. Construction of the Shinagawa to Nagoya section began in 2014, with 86% of the 286 km (178 mi) route to be in tunnels. Plans were approved in 2017 for the Chūō Shinkansen to begin at Shinagawa Station, rather than Tokyo Station as initially planned due to difficulties in securing land.

JR Central originally aimed to begin commercial service between Tokyo and Nagoya in 2027. However, in 2024, Central Japan Railway Co President Shunsuke Niwa said that due to construction delays a 2027 opening was now impossible and it is not expected to open until at least 2034.

Following the shortest route (through the Japanese Alps), JR Central estimates that it will take 40 minutes to run from Shinagawa to Nagoya. The planned travel time from Shinagawa to Shin-Osaka is 1 hour 7 minutes. The Tokaido Shinkansen as of 2010 had a minimum connection time of 2 hours 19 minutes.

While the government has granted approval for the shortest route between Tokyo and Nagoya, some prefectural governments, particularly Nagano, lobbied to have the line routed farther north to serve the city of Chino and either Ina or Kiso-Fukushima. However, that would increase both the travel time (from Tokyo to Nagoya) and the cost of construction. JR Central has confirmed it will construct the line through Kanagawa Prefecture, and terminate at Shinagawa Station.

The route for the Nagoya to Osaka section is also contested. It is planned to go via Nara, about 40 km (25 mi) south of Kyoto. Kyoto is lobbying to have the route moved north and be largely aligned with the existing Tokaido Shinkansen, which services Kyoto and not Nara.

=== Construction of new routes ===
While all routes currently under construction or with on-going preparatory works (besides the Chūō Shinkansen) are the Seibi Shinkansen routes that were decided in 1973, some local governments are advocating for the construction of additional routes. Among the proposals with the most vocal proponents are the Shikoku Shinkansen from Okayama to Shikoku, and the East Kyushu Shinkansen which will connect Ōita and Miyazaki to the existing Shinkansen network.

=== Mini-Shinkansen ===
Mini-shinkansen (ミニ新幹線) is the name given to the routes where former narrow-gauge lines have been converted to standard gauge to allow Shinkansen trains to travel to cities without the expense of constructing full Shinkansen standard lines.

Two mini-shinkansen routes have been constructed: the Yamagata Shinkansen and Akita Shinkansen. Shinkansen services to these lines traverse the Tohoku Shinkansen line from Tokyo before branching off to traditional main lines. On both the Yamagata/Shinjo and Akita lines, the narrow-gauge lines were regauged, resulting in the local services being operated by standard-gauge versions of 1,067 mm (3 ft 6 in) suburban/interurban rolling stock. On the Akita line between Omagari and Akita, one of the two narrow-gauge lines was regauged, and a section of the remaining narrow-gauge line is dual gauge, providing opportunity for Shinkansen services to pass each other without stopping.

The maximum speed on these lines is 130 km/h (81 mph), however the overall travel time to/from Tokyo is improved due to the elimination of the need for passengers to change trains at Fukushima and Morioka respectively.

As the loading gauge (size of the train that can travel on a line) was not altered when the rail gauge was widened, only Shinkansen trains specially built for these routes can travel on the lines. They are the E3 and E6 series trains.

Whilst no further Mini-shinkansen routes have been proposed, it remains an option for providing Shinkansen services to cities on the narrow-gauge network.

==== Proposed Ou Base Tunnel ====
Construction of a base tunnel on the Yamagata Shinkansen is proposed, with JR East having undertaken a survey of a planned route from Niwasaka to Sekine, just south of Yonezawa station. 23.1 km (14.4 mi) of the proposed 24.9 km (15.5 mi) line would be in tunnel, mostly to the north of the existing 88 km (55 mi) Fukushima – Yamagata section. To be built on an improved alignment, the tunnel would lower journey times between Fukushima and Yamagata by ~10 min due to a proposed line speed of up to 200 km/h.

The tunnel would avoid the Itaya Toge pass through the Ōu Mountains west of Fukushima. Gradients range from 3.0% to 3.8% and the line reaches an altitude of 548 m (1,798 ft). The curvature and steep grades of the current line limit train speeds to 55 km/h (34 mph) or less, and it is vulnerable to heavy rain and snowfall as well as high winds. Between 2011 and 2017 a total of 410 Yamagata mini-Shinkansen services were either suspended or delayed, and 40% of these incidents occurred on the line over the Itaya Toge pass.

If the ¥150 billion base tunnel is authorised, detailed design would take five years and construction another 15 years. The cost could increase by ¥12 billion if the tunnel were to be built with a cross-section large enough to permit the line to be upgraded to the full Shinkansen loading gauge.

=== Gauge Change Train ===
This is the name for the concept of using a single train that is designed to travel on both 1,067 mm (3 ft 6 in) narrow-gauge railway lines and the 1,435 mm (4 ft 8 1/2 in) standard gauge used by Shinkansen train services in Japan. The trucks/bogies of the Gauge Change Train (GCT) allow the wheels to be unlocked from the axles, narrowed or widened as necessary, and then relocked. This allows a GCT to traverse both standard-gauge and narrow-gauge tracks without the expense of regauging lines.

Three test trains were constructed, with the second set having completed reliability trials on the Yosan Line east of Matsuyama (in Shikoku) in September 2013. The third set was undertaking gauge changing trials at Shin-Yatsushiro Station (on Kyushu), commencing in 2014 for a proposed three-year period, however testing was suspended in December 2014 after accumulating approximating 33,000 km (21,000 mi), following the discovery of defective thrust bearing oil seals on the bogies. The train was being trialled between Kumamoto, travelling on the narrow-gauge line to Shin-Yatsushiro, where a gauge changer was installed, so the GCT could be trialled on the Shinkansen line to Kagoshima. It was anticipated the train would travel approximately 600,000 km (370,000 mi) over the three-year trial.

A new "full standard" Shinkansen line was opened in 2022 from Takeo Onsen to Nagasaki, with the Shin-Tosu – Takeo Onsen section of the Nishi Kyushu Shinkansen remaining narrow gauge. GCTs were proposed to provide Shinkansen service from the line's opening, however with the GCT being cancelled, JR Kyushu announced it would provide an interim 'relay' service.

There are currently no further proposals for use of the GCT, nor any development work on it.

== Competition with air ==
Compared with air transport, the Shinkansen has several advantages, including scheduling frequency and flexibility, punctual operation, comfortable seats, lower carbon emissions, and convenient city-centre terminals.

Shinkansen fares are generally competitive with domestic air fares. From a speed and convenience perspective, the Shinkansen's market share has surpassed that of air travel for journeys of less than 750 km (470 mi), while air and rail remain highly competitive with each other in the 800–900 km (500–560 mi) range and air has a higher market share for journeys of more than 1,000 km (620 mi).

During snowy weather, the Shinkansen is known to face fewer delays compared to air travel due to snow. One study done in 2016 concluded that the Tohoku Shinkansen between Tokyo and Aomori had substantially fewer days with delays longer than 30 minutes compared to air travel.

- Tokyo – Nagoya (342 km; 213 mi), Tokyo – Sendai (325 km; 202 mi), Tokyo – Hanamaki (Morioka) (496 km; 308 mi), Tokyo – Niigata (300 km; 190 mi): There were air services between these cities, but they were withdrawn after Shinkansen services started. Shinkansen runs between these cities in about two hours or less.
- Tokyo – Osaka (515 km; 320 mi): The Shinkansen is dominant because of fast (2 hours 22 minutes) and frequent service (up to 17 trains per hour spaced as close as 3 minutes apart during peak season, including 13 Nozomi services), holding around an 85% vs 15% lead in market share against air travel.
- Tokyo – Okayama (676 km; 420 mi), Tokyo – Hiroshima (821 km; 510 mi): The Shinkansen increased its market share to Hiroshima from ~40% to ~60% between 2003 and 2013. The Shinkansen takes about three to four hours and there are Nozomi trains around every 20 minutes, but airlines may provide cheaper fares, attracting price-conscious passengers.
- Tokyo – Fukuoka (1,069 km; 664 mi): The Shinkansen takes about five hours on the fastest Nozomi, and discount carriers have made air travel far cheaper, so most people choose air. Additionally, unlike many cities, there is very little convenience advantage for the location of the Shinkansen stations of the two cities as Fukuoka Airport is located near the central Tenjin district, and the Fukuoka City Subway's Airport Line connects the Airport and Tenjin via Hakata Station and Haneda Airport is similarly conveniently located.
- Osaka – Fukuoka (554 km; 344 mi): The Shinkansen dominates with approximately 85% market share against air travel between the Keihanshin area and Fukuoka. From Shin-Osaka, Nozomi and Mizuho services take about two and a half hours, and the JR West Hikari Rail Star or JR West/JR Kyushu Sakura trains operate twice an hour, taking about 2 hours and 40 minutes between the two cities.
- Tokyo – Aomori (675 km; 419 mi): The fastest Shinkansen service between these cities is 3 hours. JAL is reported to have reduced the size of planes servicing this route since the Shinkansen extension opened in 2010.
- Tokyo – Hokuriku (345 km; 214 mi): The fastest Shinkansen service between these areas is 2 1/2 hours. ANA is reported to have reduced the number of services from Tokyo to Kanazawa and Toyama from 6 to 4 per day since the Shinkansen extension opened in 2015. The share of passengers travelling this route by air is reported to have dropped from 40% to 10% in the same period.

== Outside Japan ==
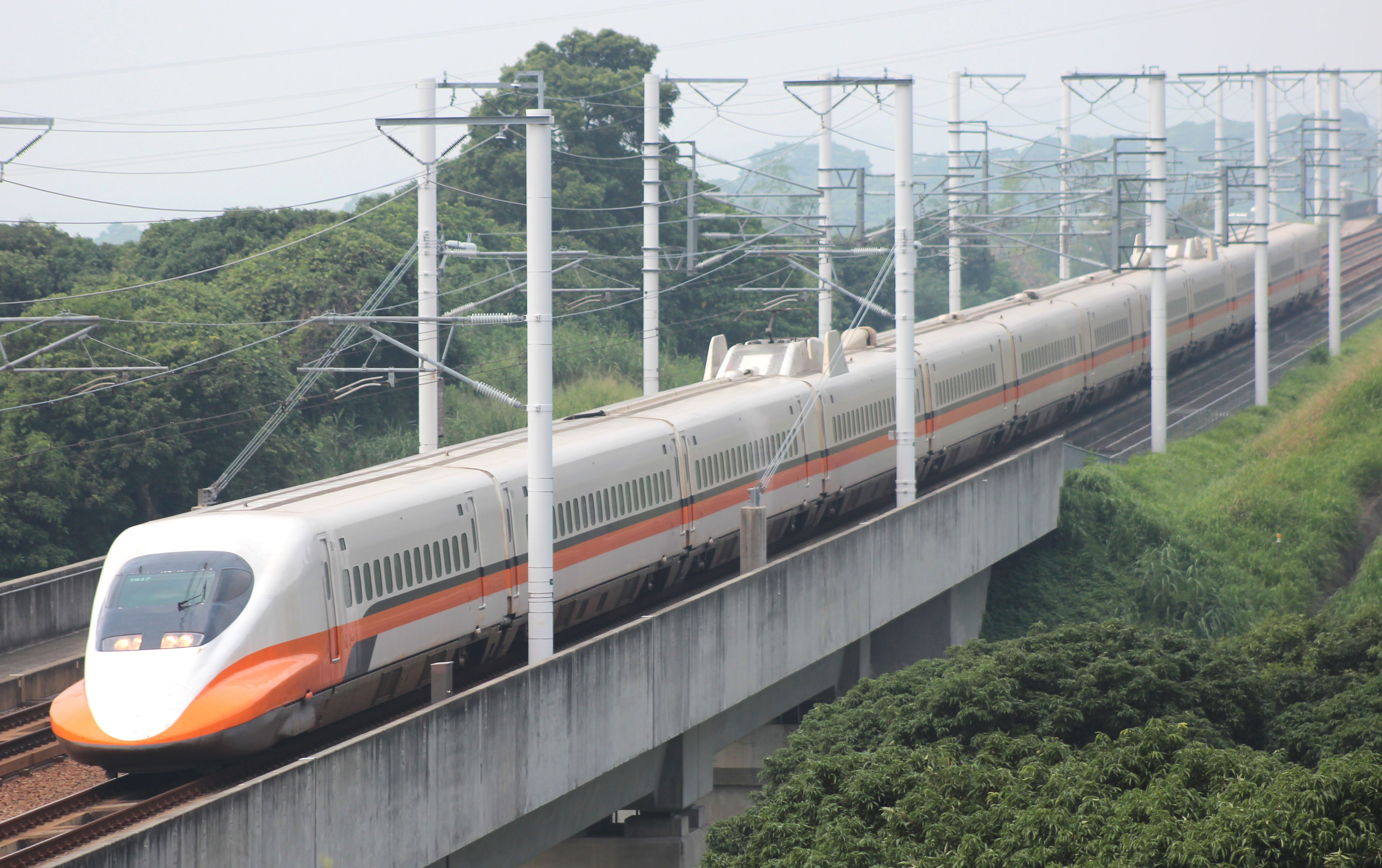
Shinkansen 700T train on a test run on the Taiwan High Speed Rail in September 2013

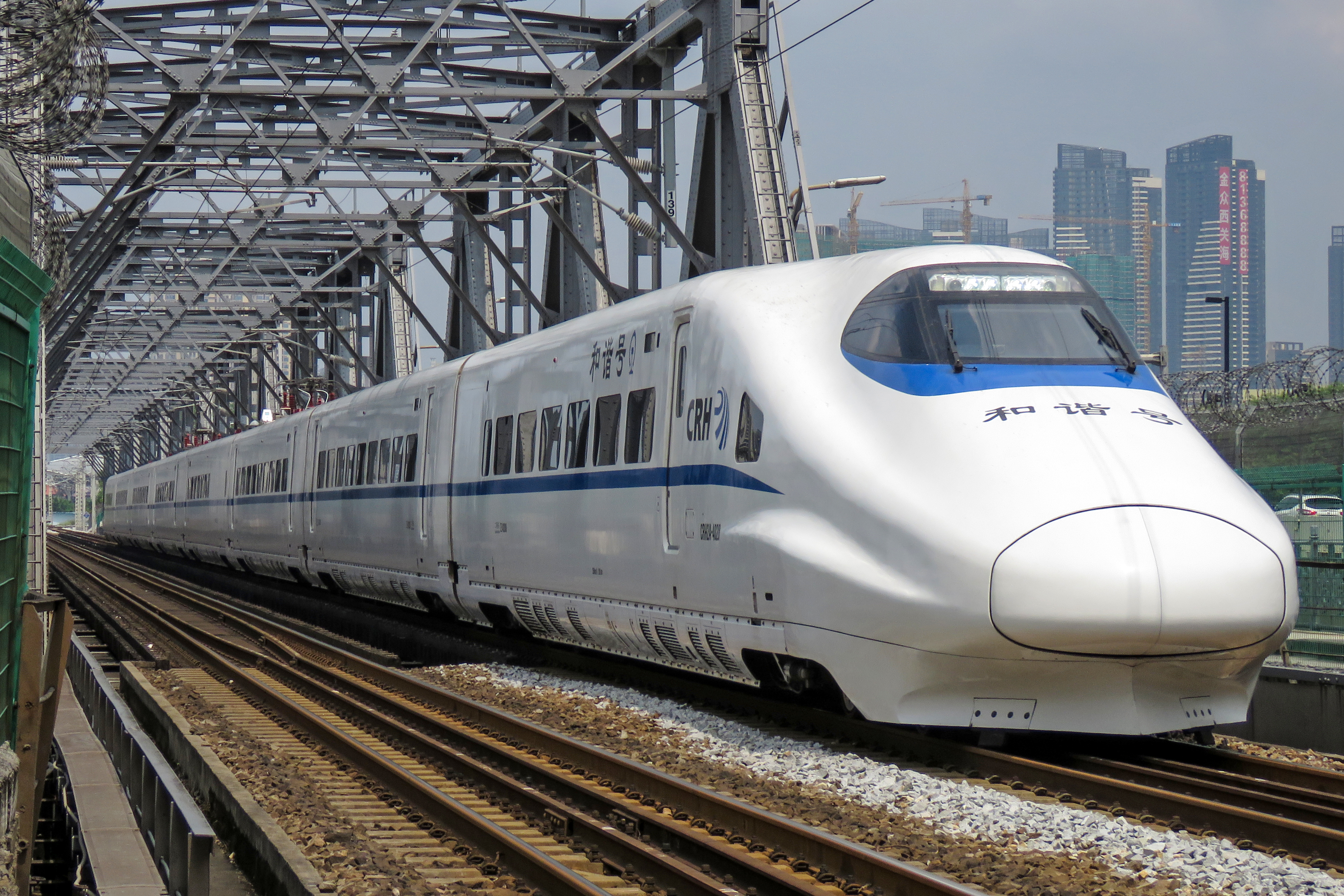
China Railway CRH2 based on the E2 Series Shinkansen, September 2018

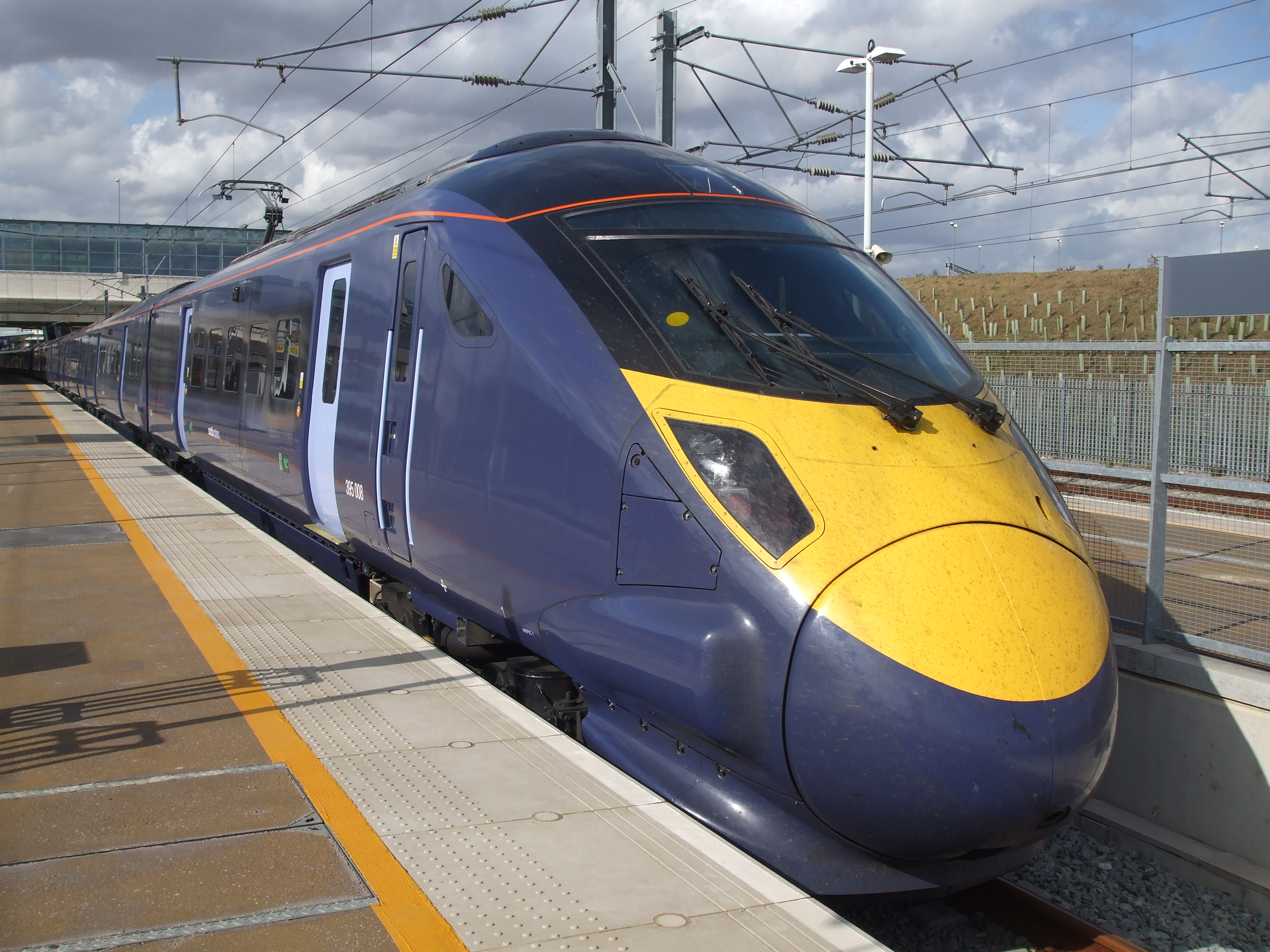
British Rail Class 395 in the United Kingdom, September 2009

Railways using Shinkansen technology are not limited to those in Japan.

=== Existing ===
==== Taiwan ====
The 700T Series, operated by Taiwan High Speed Rail, is the first operational Shinkansen type exported outside Japan. Based on the 700 series, they were built by Kawasaki Heavy Industries and are operated as 12-car sets. They first entered service in January 2007, with a maximum speed of 300 km/h (190 mph).

A 0 Series Shinkansen front car which was used in Taiwan for testing is on display at Tainan HSR station.

==== China ====
The China Railway CRH2 is based on the E2-1000 series design. The trains are built by CSR Sifang Loco & Rolling stocks corporation under a license purchased in 2004 from a consortium formed of Kawasaki Heavy Industries, Mitsubishi Electric Corporation, and Hitachi. Trial services started in January 2007.

==== United Kingdom ====
The British Rail Class 395, operated by Southeastern, incorporates technology from the 400 Series Shinkansen. Part of the Hitachi A-Train AT300 InterCity family, twenty nine sets were ordered from Hitachi for commuter services on the High Speed 1 line. The trains entered service from June 2009 and operate at a maximum speed of 140 mph (225 km/h).

A retired 0 Series Shinkansen front car was donated to the National Railway Museum, in 2000.

=== Under construction ===
==== India ====
In December 2015, India and Japan signed an agreement for the construction of India's first high speed rail link connecting Mumbai to Ahmedabad, the intention being to initially operate imported E5 Series Shinkansen sets on the line. To be funded primarily through Japanese soft loans, the link was expected to cost up to US$18.6 billion and operational by 2024. The project has been delayed by several years, and forecast costs have risen. A tender for 24 modified E5 sets was issued in 2023, though the resulting offers were not taken up by India, who now desire E10 sets, for delivery in the 2030s. The Japanese Government agreed to gift one end of life E3 and E5 sets in 2025, with delivery in 2026.

=== Under negotiation ===
==== United States ====
In 2014, it was announced that Texas Central Railway would build a ~300 mi (480 km) long line using the N700 series rolling stock. The trains are proposed to operate at over 320 km/h (200 mph).

=== Proposed subject to funding ===
==== Thailand ====
Japan will provide Shinkansen technology for a high-speed rail link between Bangkok and Chiang Mai under an agreement reached with Thailand on 27 May 2015. Total project costs are estimated in excess of 1 trillion yen ($8.1 billion). Several hurdles remain, however, including securing the funding.

=== Potential opportunities ===
==== Australia ====
A private organization dedicated to aiding the Australian Government in delivering high speed rail, Consolidated Land and Rail Australia, has considered purchasing Shinkansen technology or SC Maglev rolling stock for a potential Melbourne-Canberra-Sydney-Brisbane line.

In 2023, the High Speed Rail Authority was established by the Government. The Government committed AU$500 million to progress planning for a future high speed rail network – of this, AU$78.8 million was allocated to deliver the business case for the Sydney to Newcastle section, which is expected to be provided to the Government by the end of 2024. Japan Railways Group and Hitachi attended an industry briefing on 27 August 2024.

==== Ireland ====
As part of the Ireland 2040 infrastructural upgrade scheme, a high-speed rail network using Shinkansen technology is being investigated along the Cork-Dublin-Belfast axis, spanning the island of Ireland from north to south.

==== United States and Canada ====
The U.S. Federal Railroad Administration was in talks with a number of countries concerning high-speed rail, notably Japan, France and Spain. On 16 May 2009, FRA Deputy Chief Karen Rae expressed hope that Japan would offer its technical expertise to Canada and the United States. Transportation Secretary Ray LaHood indicated interest in test riding the Japanese Shinkansen in 2009.

On 1 June 2009, JR Central Chairman, Yoshiyuki Kasai, announced plans to export both the N700 Series Shinkansen high-speed train system and the SCMaglev to international export markets, including the United States and Canada.

==== Brazil ====
Japan had promoted its Shinkansen technology to the Government of Brazil for use on the once planned high-speed rail set to link Rio de Janeiro, São Paulo and Campinas. On 14 November 2008, Japanese Deputy Prime Minister Tarō Asō and Brazilian President Luiz Inácio Lula da Silva talked about this rail project. President Lula asked a consortium of Japanese companies to participate in the bidding process. Prime Minister Aso concurred on the bilateral cooperation to improve rail infrastructure in Brazil, including the Rio–São Paulo–Campinas high-speed rail line. The Japanese consortium included the Ministry of Land, Infrastructure, Transport and Tourism, Mitsui & Co., Mitsubishi Heavy Industries, Kawasaki Heavy Industries and Toshiba. Nothing was implemented.

==== Vietnam ====
Vietnam Railways was considering the use of Shinkansen technology for high-speed rail between the capital Hanoi and the southern commercial hub of Ho Chi Minh City, according to the Nihon Keizai Shimbun, citing an interview with Chief Executive Officer Nguyen Huu Bang. The Vietnamese government had already given basic approval for the Shinkansen system, although it still requires financing and formal consent from the prime minister. Vietnam rejected a funding proposal in 2010, so funding for the $56 billion project is uncertain. Hanoi was exploring additional Japanese funding Official Development Assistance as well as funds from the World Bank and Asian Development Bank. The 1,560-kilometre (970 mi) line would replace the current colonial-era rail line. Vietnam hoped to launch high-speed trains by 2020 and planned to start by building three sections, including a 90 km (56 mi) stretch between the central coastal cities of Da Nang and Huế, seen as potentially most profitable. Vietnam Railways had sent engineers to Central Japan Railway Company for technical training.

== See also ==
- High speed rail in China
- High speed rail in Europe
- High speed rail in India
- High speed rail in the United States
- Rail transport in Japan
- Shanghai Maglev Train – Railway line in Shanghai using magnetic levitation train
- Shinkansen too hard ice cream – Type of Japanese ice cream
- Transport in Japan
