= Class E926 Shinkansen =

Japanese high-speed inspection train

Class E926 "East i"
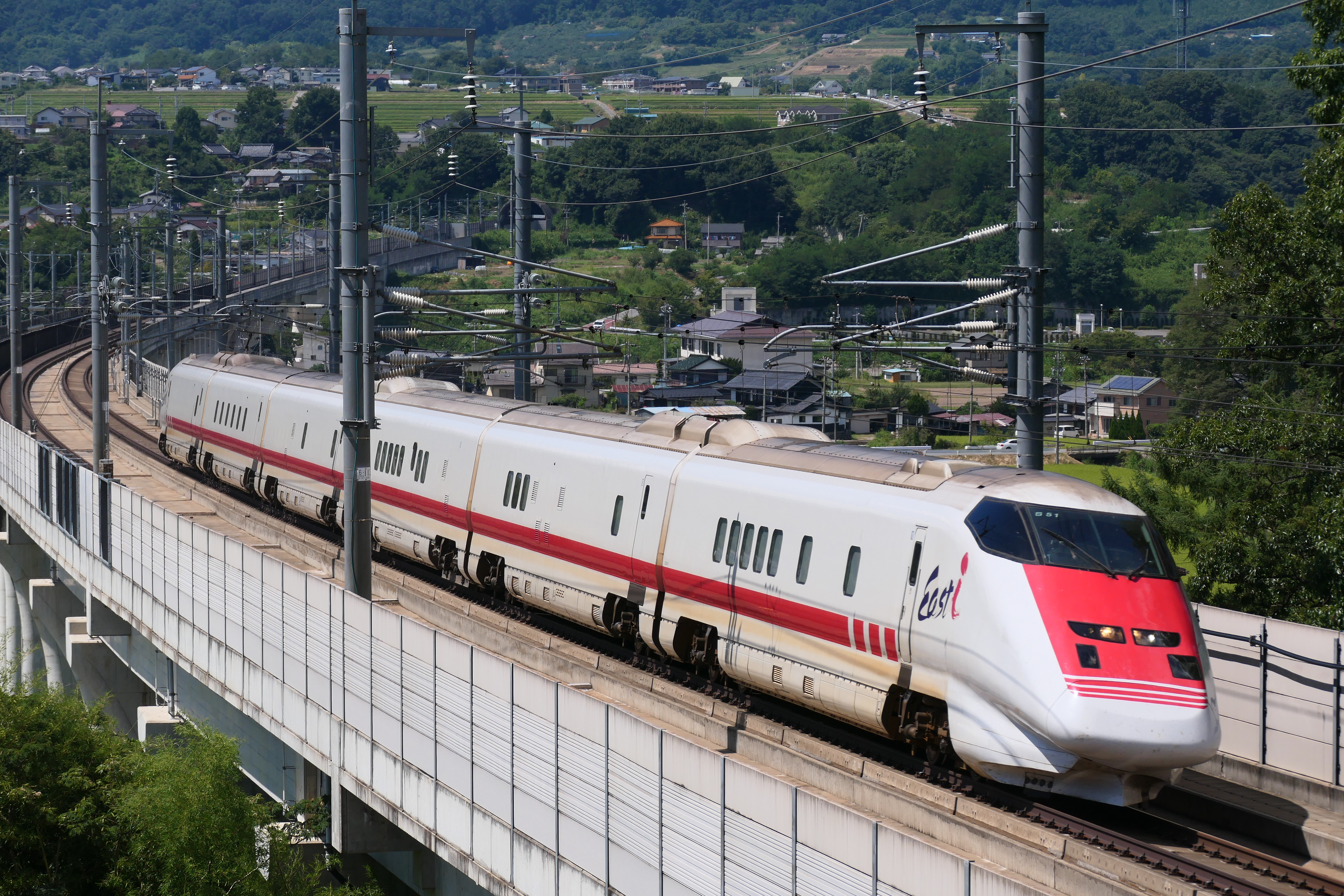
- East i series inspection train
- Manufacturer: Tokyu Car Corporation
- Replaced: Class 925
- Constructed: 2001
- Entered service: 2001
- Scrapped: 2015 (E926-13)
- Number built: 7 vehicles
- Number in service: 6 vehicles (1 set)
- Number scrapped: 1 vehicle
- Successor: Class E927
- Formation: 6 cars per trainset
- Fleet numbers: S51
- Operators: JR East, JR Hokkaido
- Lines served: Hokuriku Shinkansen, Jōetsu Shinkansen, Tōhoku Shinkansen, Hokkaido Shinkansen, Yamagata Shinkansen, Akita Shinkansen

Specifications
- Train length: 125.6 m (412 ft)
- Car length: 20 m (66 ft) or 22.8 m (75 ft)
- Width: 2.94 m (9.6 ft)
- Height: 4.29 m (14.1 ft)
- Maximum speed: 275 km/h (171 mph) (Tōhoku Shinkansen, Jōetsu Shinkansen, Hokuriku Shinkansen, Hokkaido Shinkansen); 130 km/h (80 mph) (Yamagata Shinkansen, Akita Shinkansen)
- Traction motors: Mitsubishi Electric three-phase induction AC motor MT-205
- Acceleration: 1.6 km/(h⋅s) (0.99 mph/s)
- Electric systems: 25 kV 50/60 Hz AC, 20 kV 50 Hz AC overhead catenary
- Current collection: Pantograph
- Bogies: DT207A, TR8012 (E926-3, 13)
- Braking system: Regenerative braking combined with electric command type air braking
- Track gauge: 1,435 mm (4 ft 8 1/2 in)

The Class E926 (Japanese: E926形) also known as East-i, is a high-speed diagnostic train operated by East Japan Railway Company (JR East) on Japan's high-speed Shinkansen network. Introduced in 2001, the train is based on the E3 series and is used to inspect track, overhead lines, and signalling infrastructure at speeds of up to 275 kilometres per hour (171 mph). The E926 operates on the Tōhoku, Jōetsu, Yamagata, Akita, and Hokuriku Shinkansen lines, and also runs on the Hokkaido Shinkansen line, owned by JR Hokkaido, as well as sections of the Hokuriku line owned by JR West. A comparable diagnostic train, known as Doctor Yellow, operates on the Tōkaidō and San’yō Shinkansen lines.

== Overview ==
The Class E926 is a non-revenue earning diagnostic train designed to replace the aging Class 925 inspection train. The Class 925, based on the 200 series, had a lower top speed than newly introduced trainsets at the time, such as the E3 series, and its loading gauge was also incompatible with the narrower mini-Shinkansen lines, the Yamagata and Akita Shinkansen. At the time, the mini-Shinkansen relied on KuMoYa 743 series inspection railcars. In response to these needs, the Class E926 was introduced in 2001, with the Class 925 withdrawn that same year.

The i in East i stands for intelligent, integrated, and inspection. Since the routes and times of operation of the East i train are not publicly disclosed, it is considered lucky by railway enthusiasts when the viewer sees it.

In October 2025, JR East has announced its plans to replace the Class E926 with a new Class E927 trainset. The Class E927 is being designed by the London-based Tangerine design firm, who are also designing the E10 Series Shinkansen also for JR East. The new trainset, nicknamed 'SOAR', is expected to enter service in 2029.

== Formation ==
There are 7 East i series inspection train cars that were built. Cars 2, 4 and 6 are equipped with a single arm pantograph. Prior to the scrapping of car E926-13 in 2015, when the 6-car train was being maintained, a spare track inspection car was inserted into the pre-production E2 series N21 set.

Car No.	1	2	3 (13)	4	5	6
Numbering	Mzc	M1	T1	M1	M2	Mzc
Uses	Communication, signal, and catenary testing car	Communication and power supply testing car	Track inspection car	Catenary inspection car	Power supply and signal detection car	Communication, signal, and catenary testing car

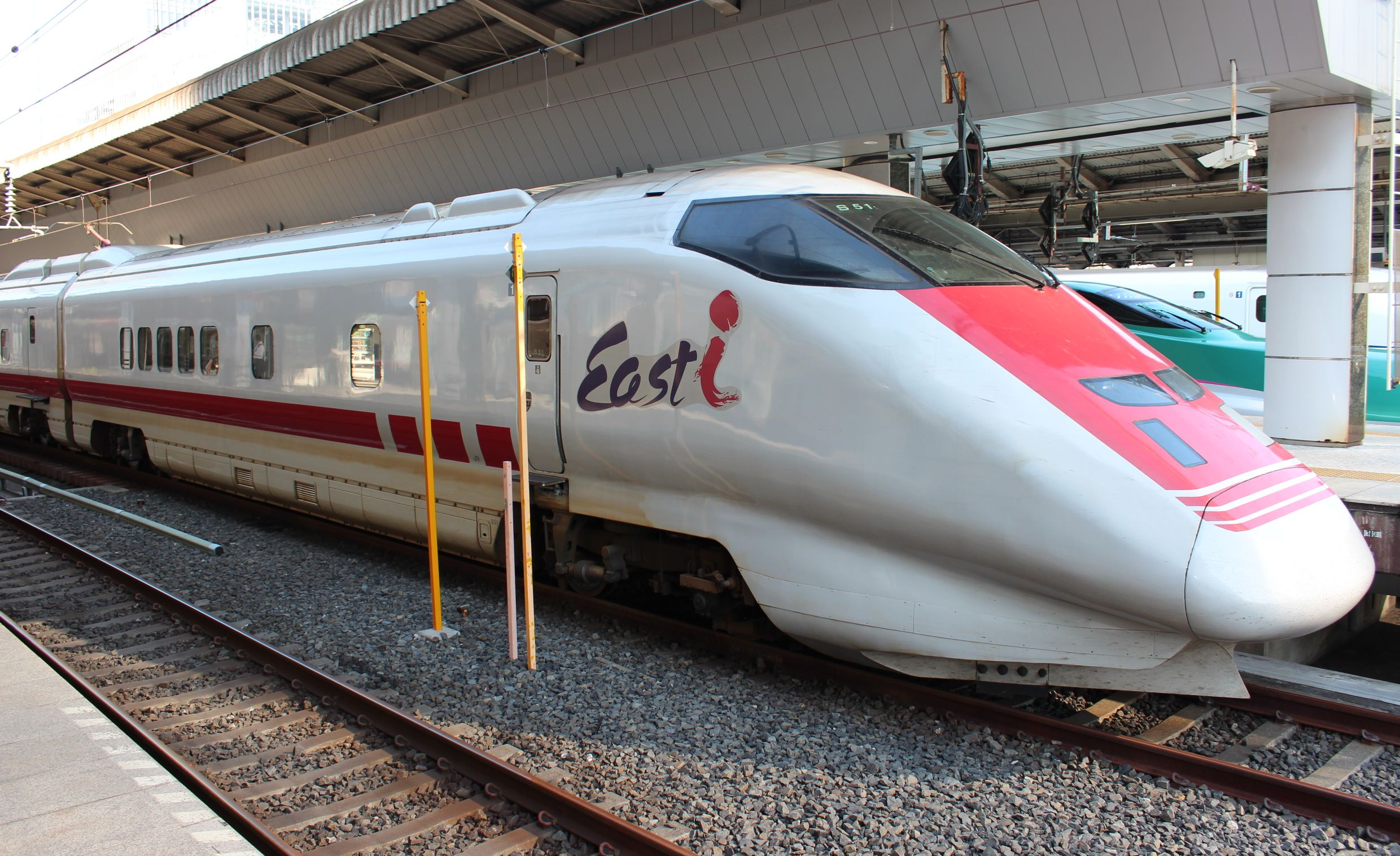
E926-6 (Car 1)

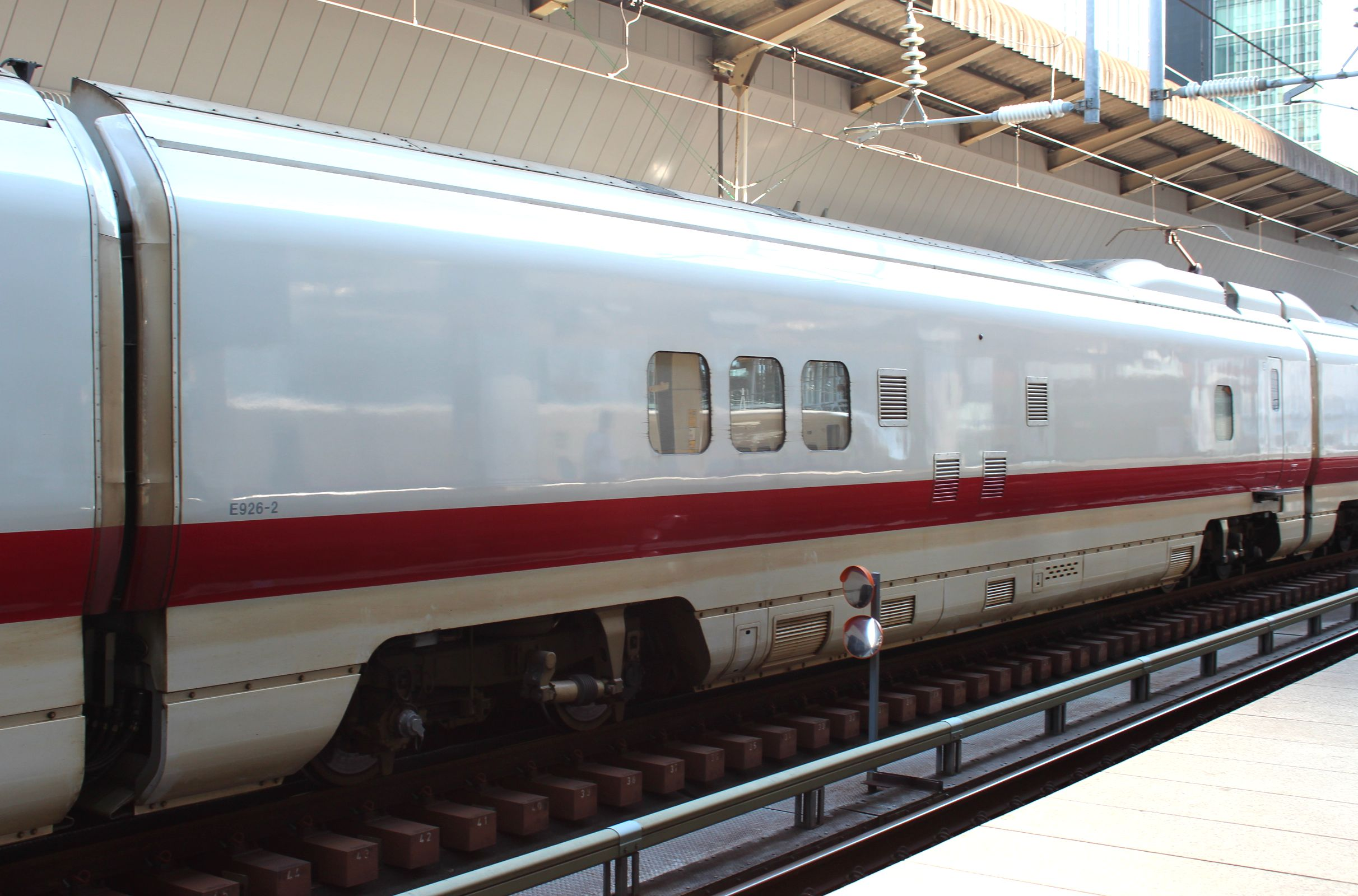
E926-2 (Car 2)

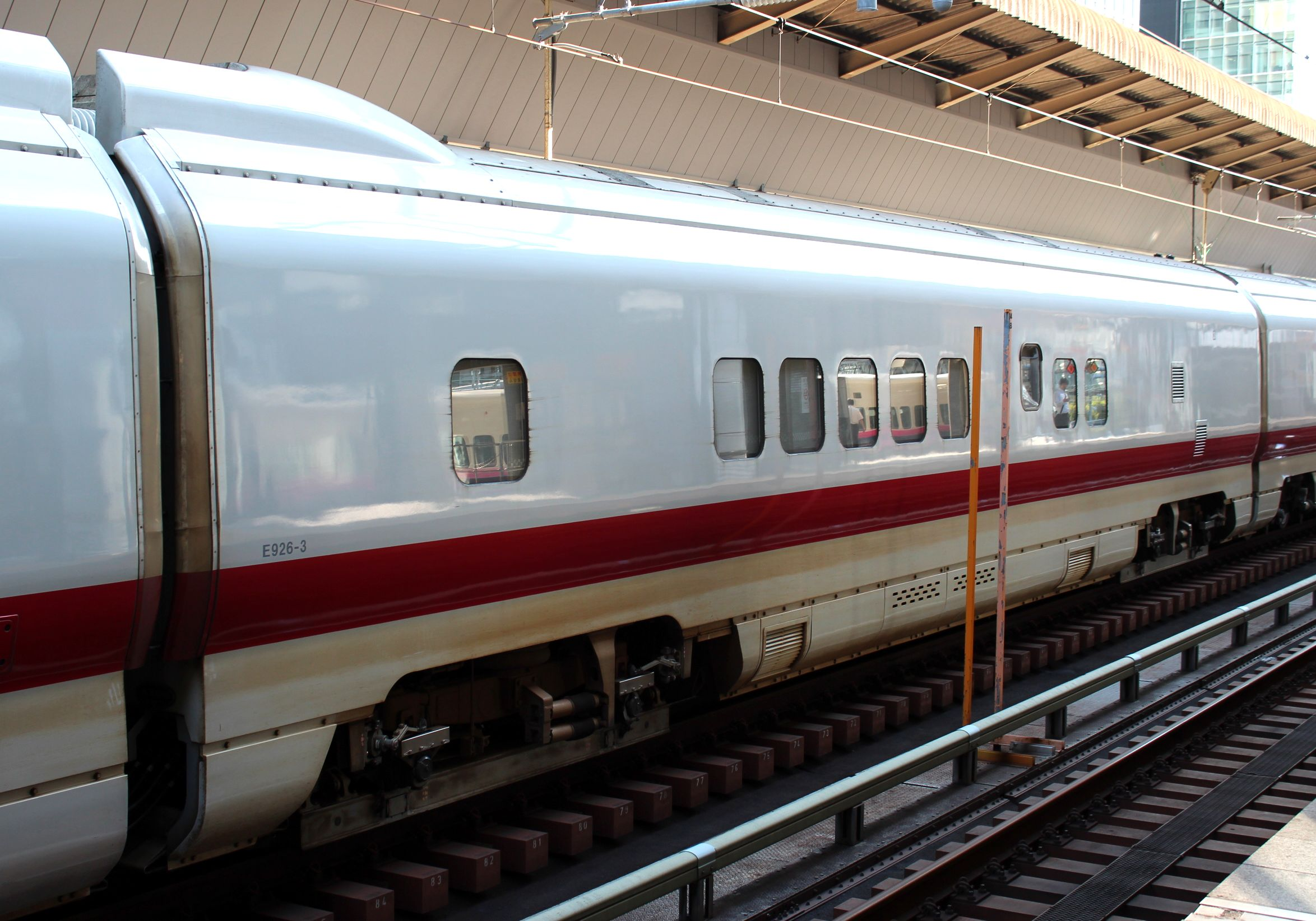
E926-3 (Car 3)

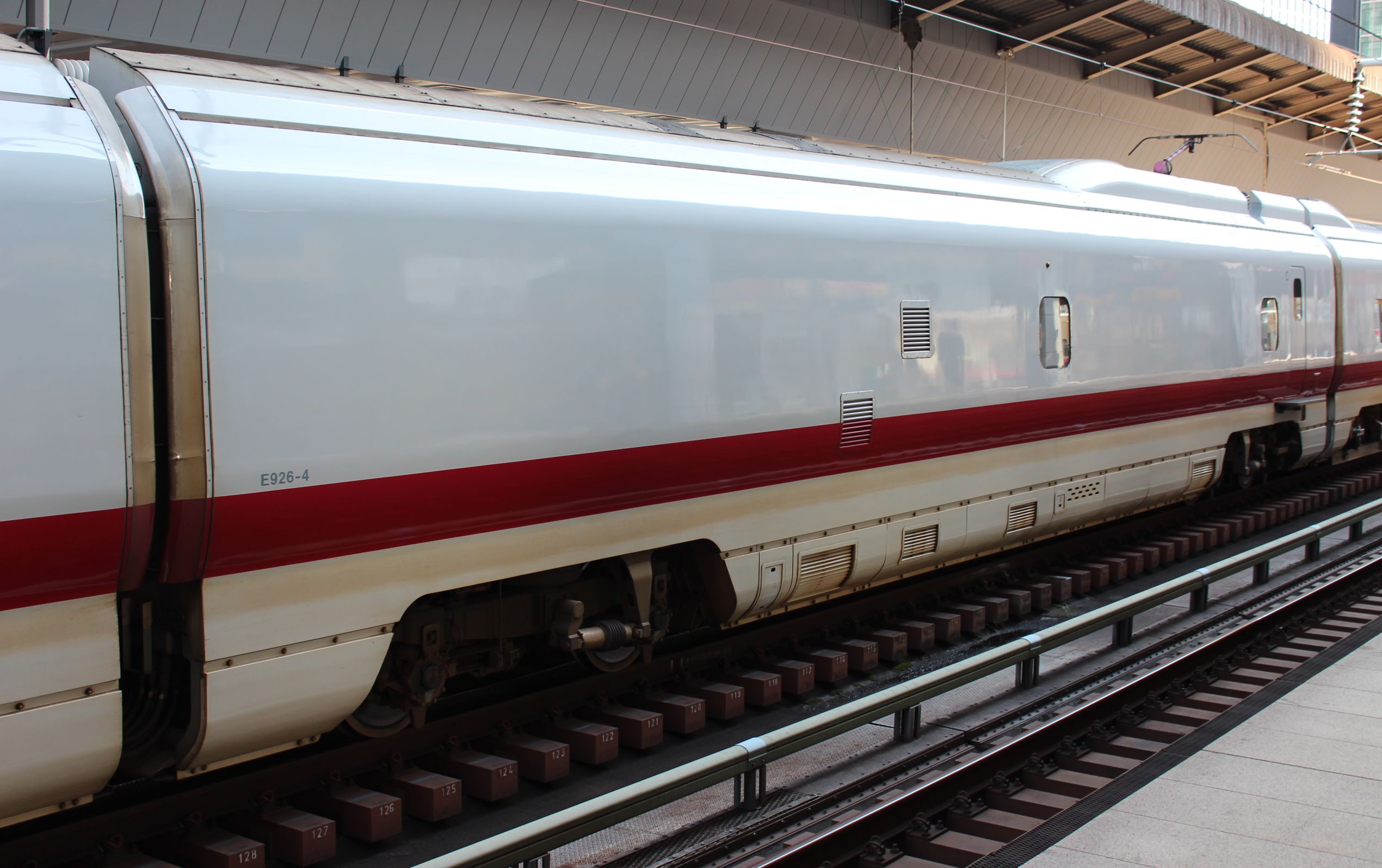
E926-4 (Car 4)

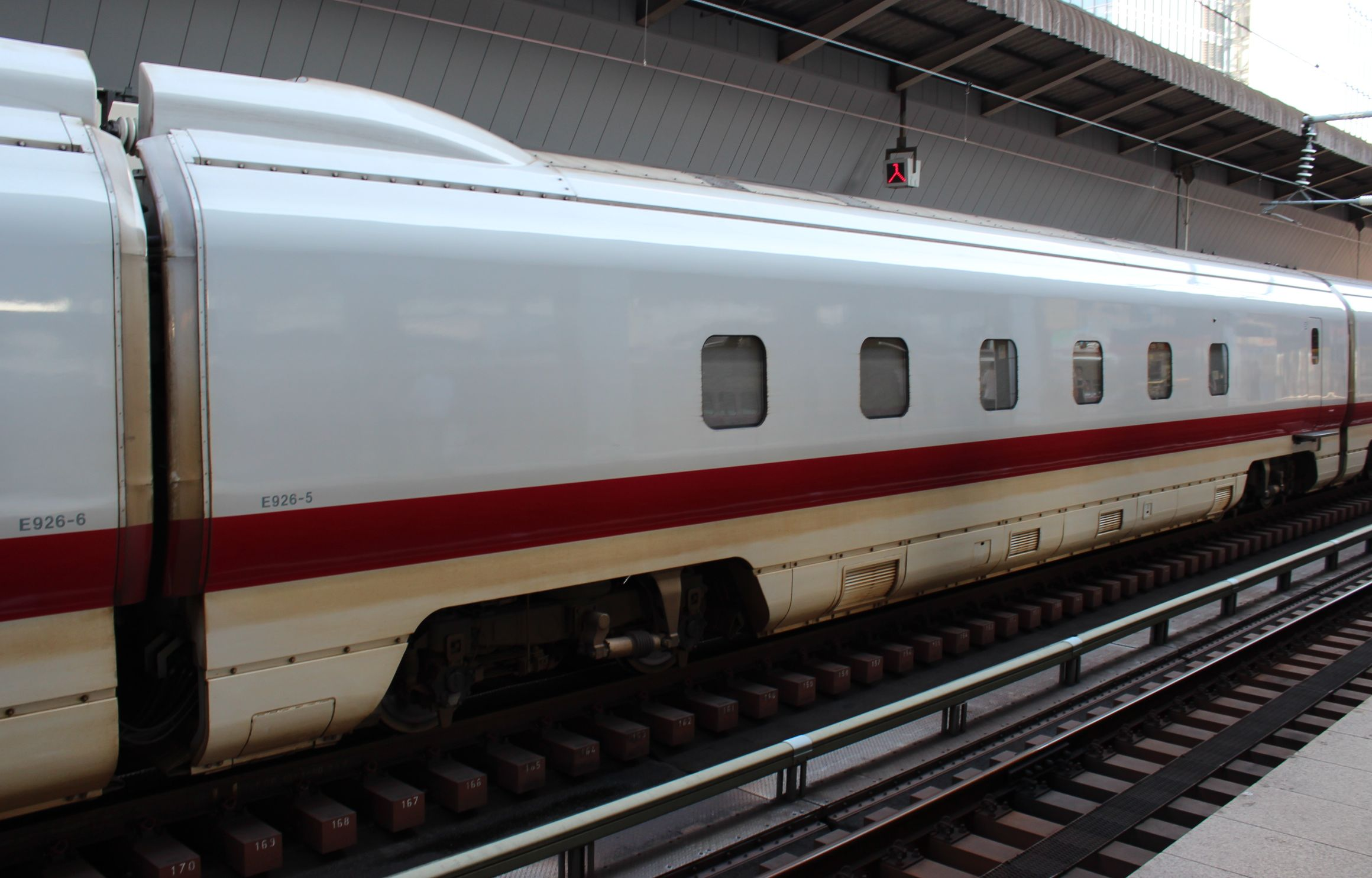
E926-5 (Car 5)

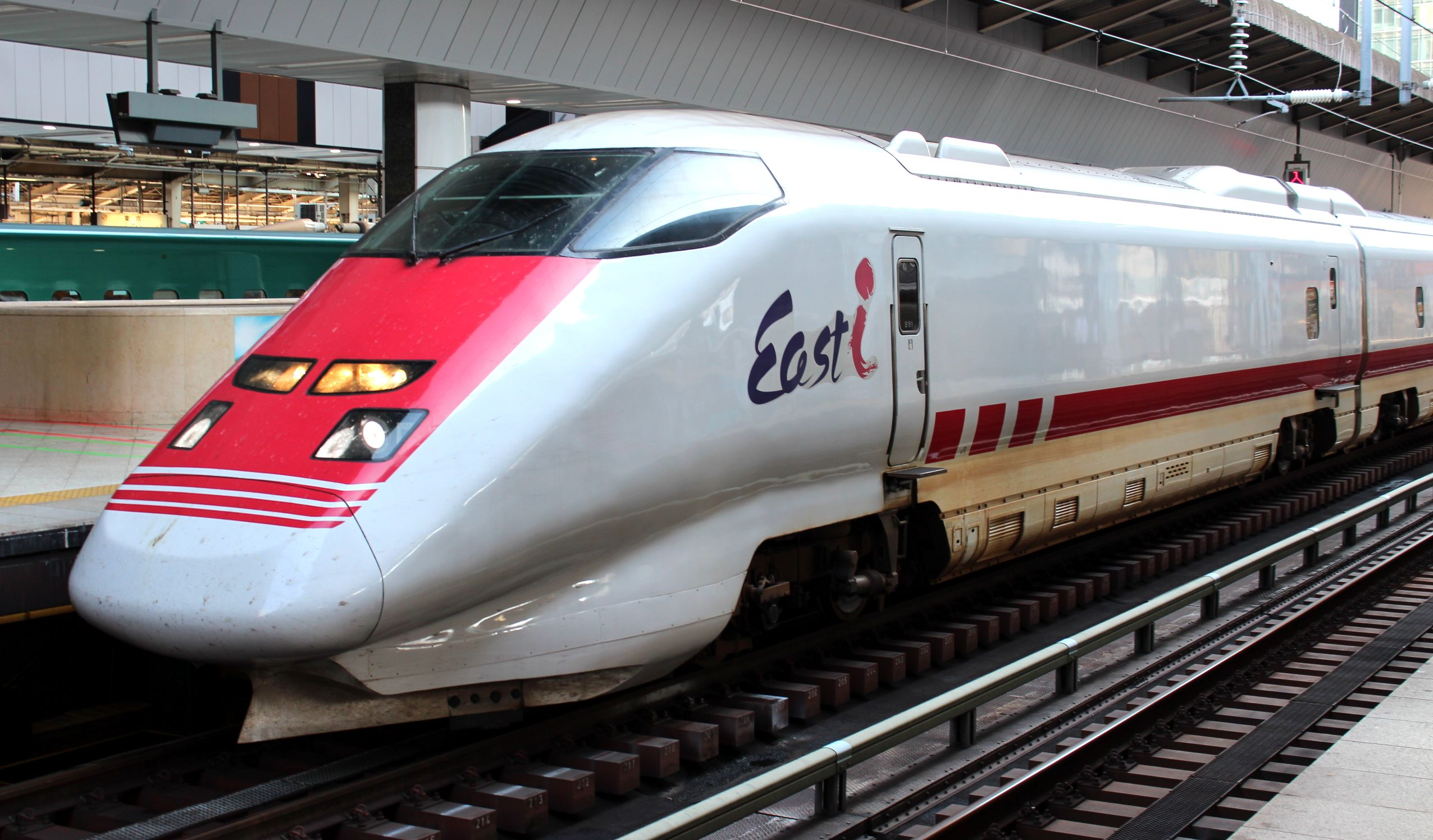
E926-1 (Car 6)

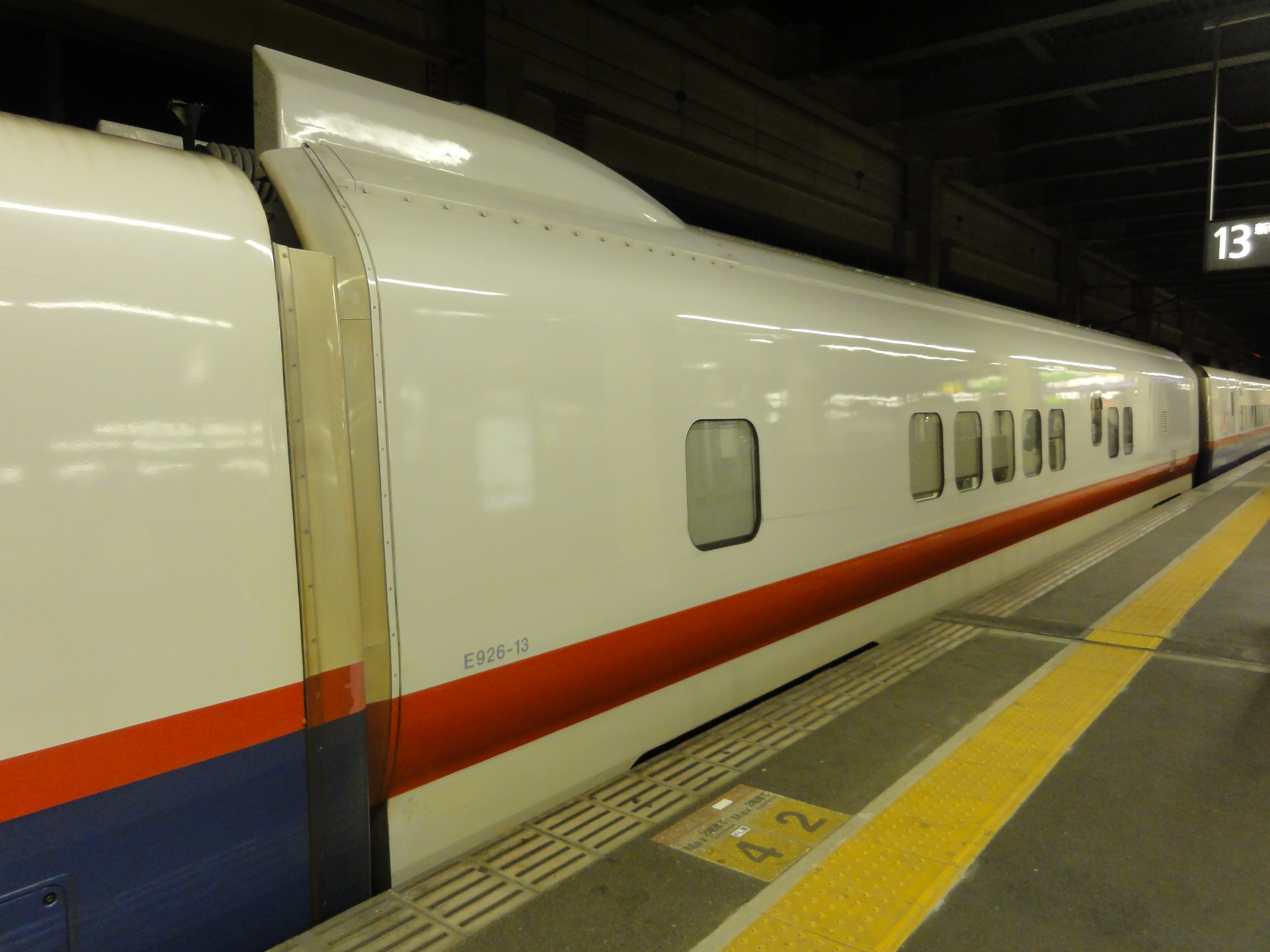
E926-13 (The spare carriage that is inserted into an E2 series set when the 6-car set is being maintained) (Scrapped in 2015)

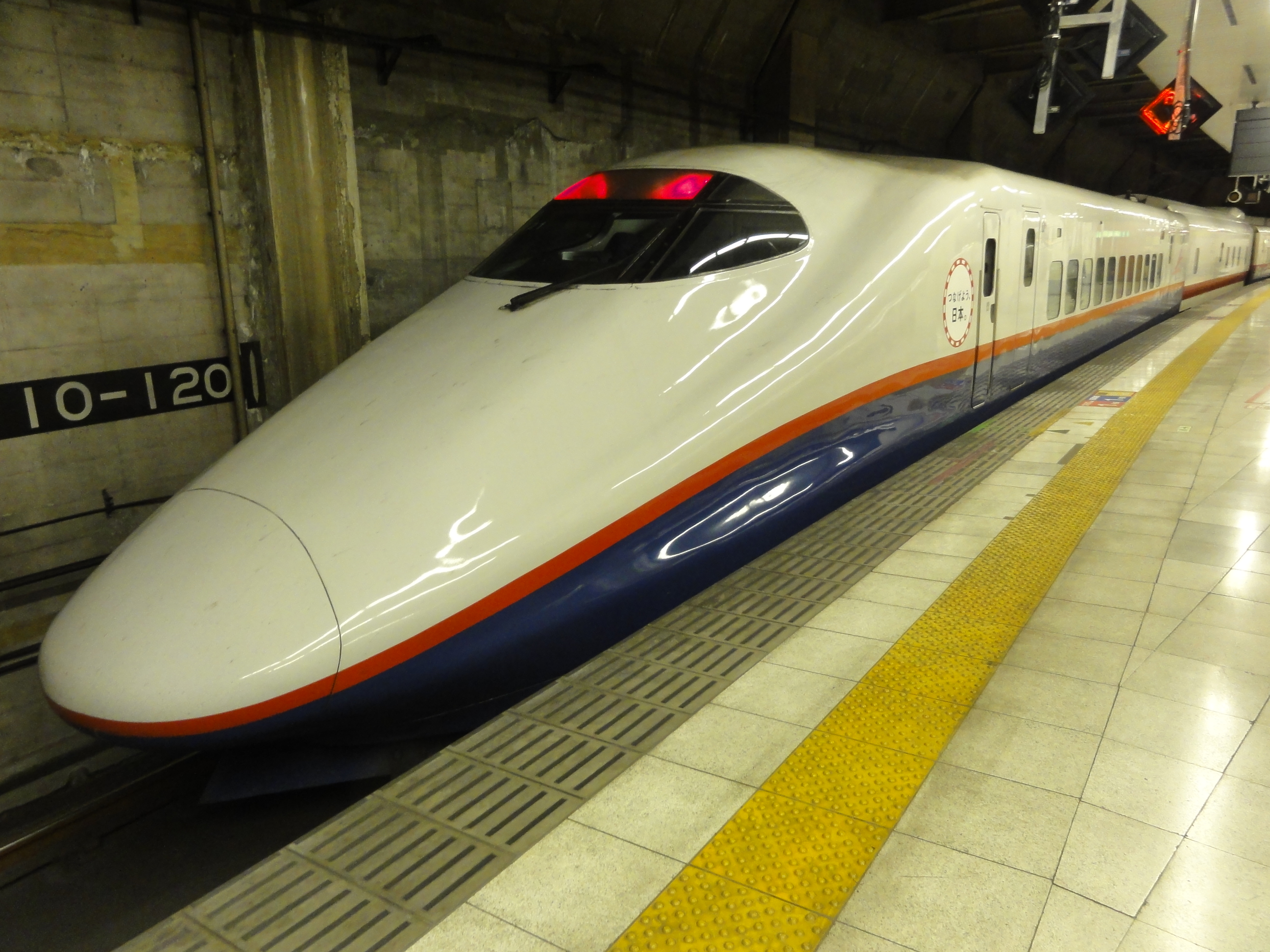
E2 series set N21 with the track inspection car in the background
