= Class 962 Shinkansen =

Japanese prototype shinkansen train

Class 962
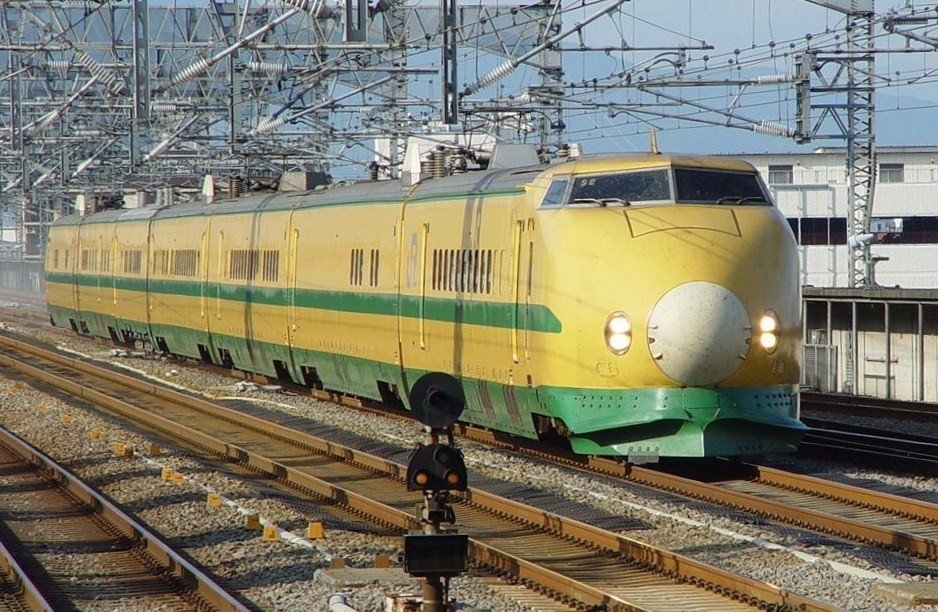
- Class 925-10 "Doctor Yellow", converted from the former Class 962 trainset, at Takasaki in September 2002
- In service: 1979–2003
- Manufacturers: Hitachi, Kawasaki HI, Kinki Sharyo, Nippon Sharyo, Tokyu Car
- Constructed: 1979
- Number built: 6 vehicles
- Number in service: 0
- Number preserved: 0
- Formation: 6 cars
- Operator: JNR

Specifications
- Car body construction: Aluminium alloy
- Car length: 25,000 mm (82 ft 1/4 in)
- Width: 3,380 mm (11 ft 1 1/8 in)
- Doors: 2 sliding doors per side
- Maximum speed: 210 km/h (130 mph)
- Traction system: MT201X (230 kW (308 hp))
- Electric systems: 25 kV AC, 50/60 Hz; Overhead catenary
- Current collection: Pantograph
- Bogies: DT9019 (cars 1-4), DT9020 (cars 5-6)
- Safety system: ATC-2
- Track gauge: 1,435 mm (4 ft 8 1/2 in) standard gauge

The Class 962 (Japanese: 962形) was a six-car Japanese Shinkansen train built in 1979 as the prototype for the new (200 series) trains to be operated on the Tōhoku Shinkansen and Jōetsu Shinkansen routes. After the lines opened in 1982 it was converted into the Class 925-10, part of the Doctor Yellow series of track inspection trains.

== Design ==
The Class 962 trainset incorporated technology developed in the earlier Class 951 and Class 961 set, with extensive snow-proofing features to cope with revenue service in the wintry areas served by the Tōhoku and Jōetsu Shinkansen routes. The design limited the maximum axle load to 16.3 tonnes.

Bogie shrouds and diaphragms between cars were fitted to this set as a noise reduction measure, but these features were not used on the 200 series design due to the complications this added to maintenance. The DT9019 and DT9020 bogies were derived from the DT200A design used on the earlier 0 series trains.

Internally, only cars 1 and 4 were fitted out with passenger seating. The seating in car 1 included 3+2 abreast standard-class seating arranged with seat pitches of 1,000 mm (39.4 in) and 970 mm (38.2 in), 2+2 abreast standard-class seating with a seat pitch of 1,000 mm (39.4 in), and 2+2 abreast Green class (first class) seating with a seat pitch of 1,160 mm (45.7 in). Car 4 featured 3+2 abreast seating using the earlier 0 series flip-over style seats with a seat pitch of 970 mm (38.2 in) and new reclining non-rotating seats also with a pitch of 970 mm (38.2 in). The latter were used on production 200 series trains with increased seat pitch.

== Formation ==
The 6-car set was formed as follows.

Car No.	1	2	3	4	5	6
Designation	Mc	M'	M	M'	M	M'c
Numbering	962-1	962-2	962-3	962-4	962-5	962-6
Manufacturer	Hitachi	Kinki Sharyo	Tokyu Car	Nippon Sharyo	Kawasaki HI	

Cars 2, 4, and 6 were equipped with scissors type pantographs.

== History ==
The train was unveiled on 22 February 1979. Test running on the Tōhoku Shinkansen test track at Oyama continued until June 1980. After this, the train was used for test running on the Jōetsu Shinkansen prior to the opening of the line.

From January 1983, the train was converted to become the 7-car Class 925-10 "Doctor Yellow" track and overhead line inspection train S2 with the insertion of track condition recording car 921-41 built by Tokyu Car Corporation in November 1980. This train was withdrawn on 25 January 2003.
