= Doctor Yellow =

Japanese high-speed track and wire testing train

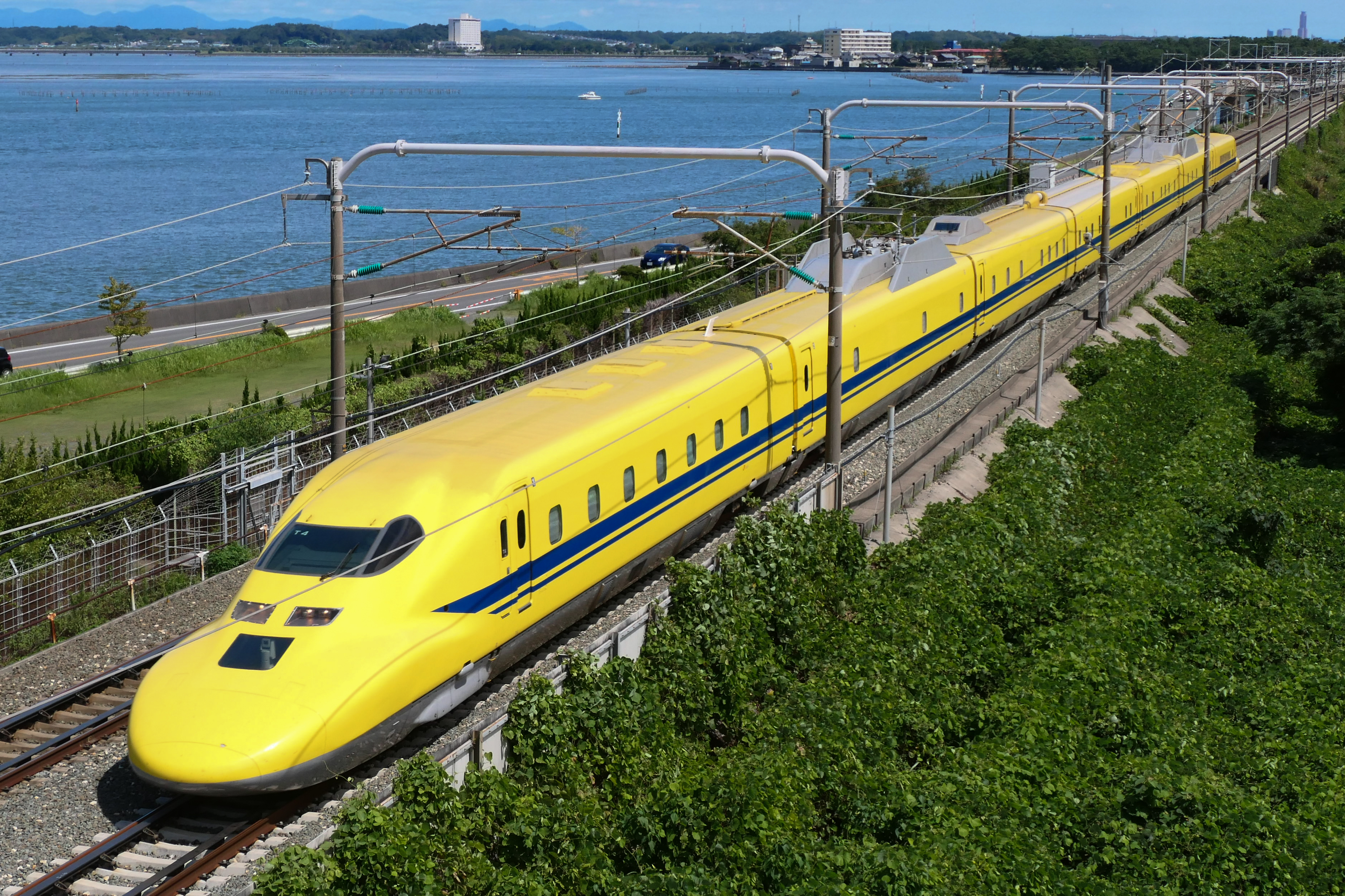
JR Central's Class 923 "Doctor Yellow" set T4 on the Tōkaidō Shinkansen, September 2021

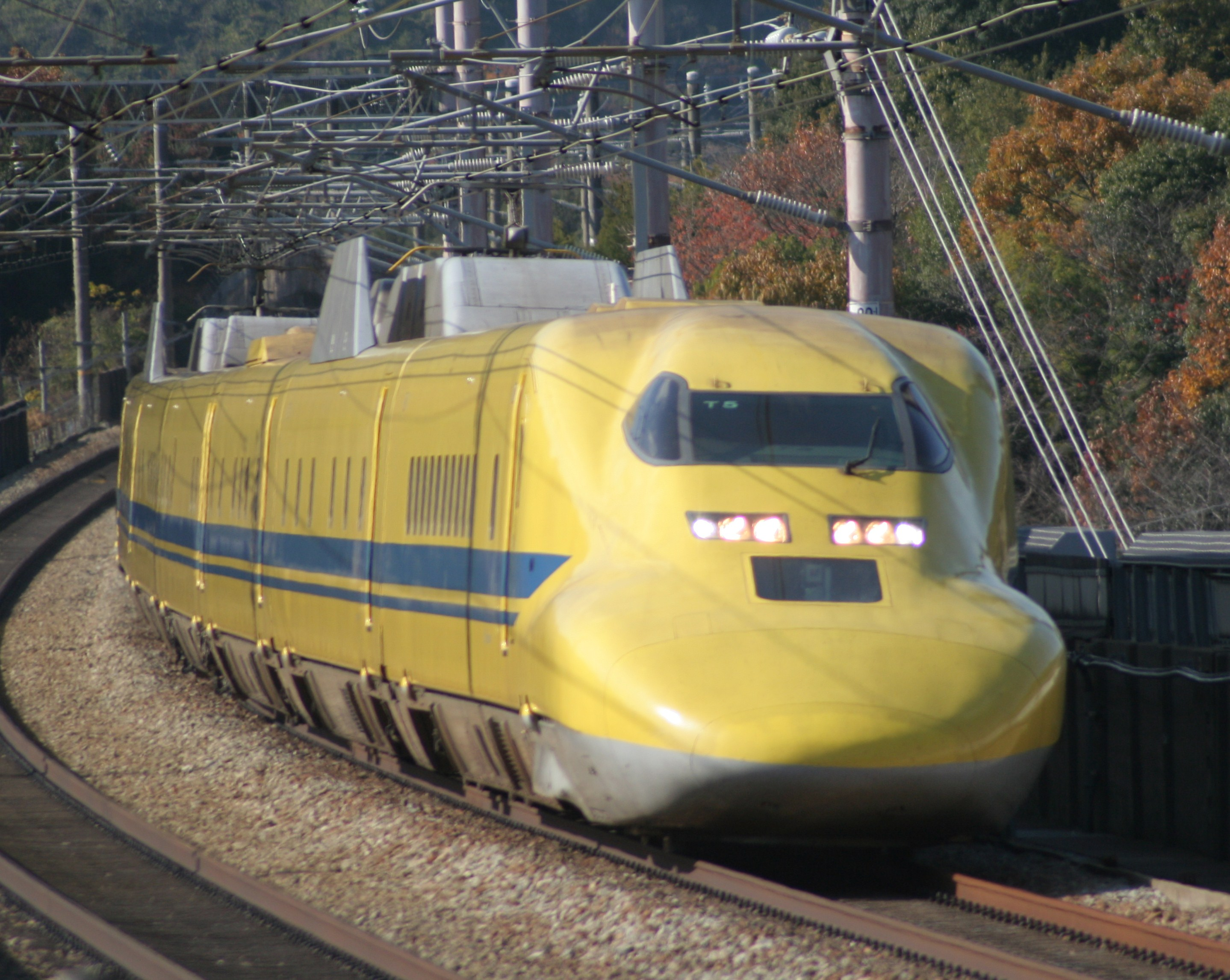
JR West's Class 923 "Doctor Yellow" set T5 on the Sanyo Shinkansen, December 2009

Doctor Yellow runs along the tracks in rural Kanagawa, September 2026

Doctor Yellow (Japanese: ドクターイエロー, Hepburn: Dokutā Ierō) is the nickname for a series of high-speed maintenance of way and track geometry trainsets used on JR Central's Tokaido Shinkansen and JR West's San'yō Shinkansen lines. The trains have special equipment on board to monitor the condition of the track and overhead wires, including special instrumented bogies and observation blisters. Line inspection is carried out at full speed, up to 270 km/h or 168 mph on the Tōkaidō Shinkansen and 285 km/h or 177 mph on the Sanyō Shinkansen. Doctor Yellow trains make three round trips between Tokyo and Hakata Station every month. Depending on the day, trains follow the stopping pattern of either Nozomi or Kodama trains. A similar type of diagnostic train called East i is operated by JR East on the Tōhoku Shinkansen.

"Doctor" in the name "Doctor Yellow" refers to their test and diagnostic function, and "Yellow" refers to the bright yellow livery they are painted in. The original color scheme of yellow with a blue stripe (applied to the Class 921 track-recording cars) was created by reversing the colors (blue with yellow stripe) used by track-recording cars on Japan's 1,067 mm (3 ft 6 in) narrow-gauge railways. Some Doctor Yellow sets are painted with a green waistline stripe rather than a blue one. In build and appearance, they resemble the production, passenger-carrying Shinkansen trains they are based on.

Because the schedule for this train is not made public, witnessing a Doctor Yellow in operation is a matter of chance. As a result, seeing one is said to bring the witness good luck or happiness. Railfans have set up websites and social media accounts to predict Doctor Yellow's arrival dates and times at stations along the route.

On 13 June 2024, JR Central announced that they would terminate use of Doctor Yellow trains on the Tōkaidō Shinkansen line in January 2025, with plans for farewell events – including commemorative train rides, displays, and souvenirs – to be announced at a later date. At the same time, JR West announced plans to retire their trains after 2027. They are scheduled to be replaced with commercial N700S Series Shinkansen trains that incorporate inspection and observation equipment. These N700S units will be named Dr. S as an official successor to Doctor Yellow.

== List of Doctor Yellow trains past and present ==
=== For Tōkaidō and Sanyō Shinkansen ===
- Non-powered track recording cars (Yellow with blue stripe):
  - 921-1: Built in 1962 (initially numbered 4001), and retired in 1980.
  - 921-2: Converted in 1964 from former MaRoNeFu 29-11 sleeping car, and retired in 1976.
- 0 series type (Yellow with blue stripe):
  - 922-0 (Set T1): 4-car set converted in 1964 from the prototype set (class 1000 Set B) built in 1961, and retired in 1976.
  - 922-10 (Set T2): 7-car set owned by JR Central. Built in 1974 and retired in 2001.
  - 922-20 (Set T3): 7-car set owned by JR West. Built in 1979 and retired in 2005.
- 700 series type (Yellow with blue stripe):
  - 923 (Set T4): 7-car set owned by JR Central. Delivered in 2000. Retired on 29 January 2025.
  - 923-3000 (Set T5): 7-car set owned by JR West. Delivered in 2005. To be retired in 2027.
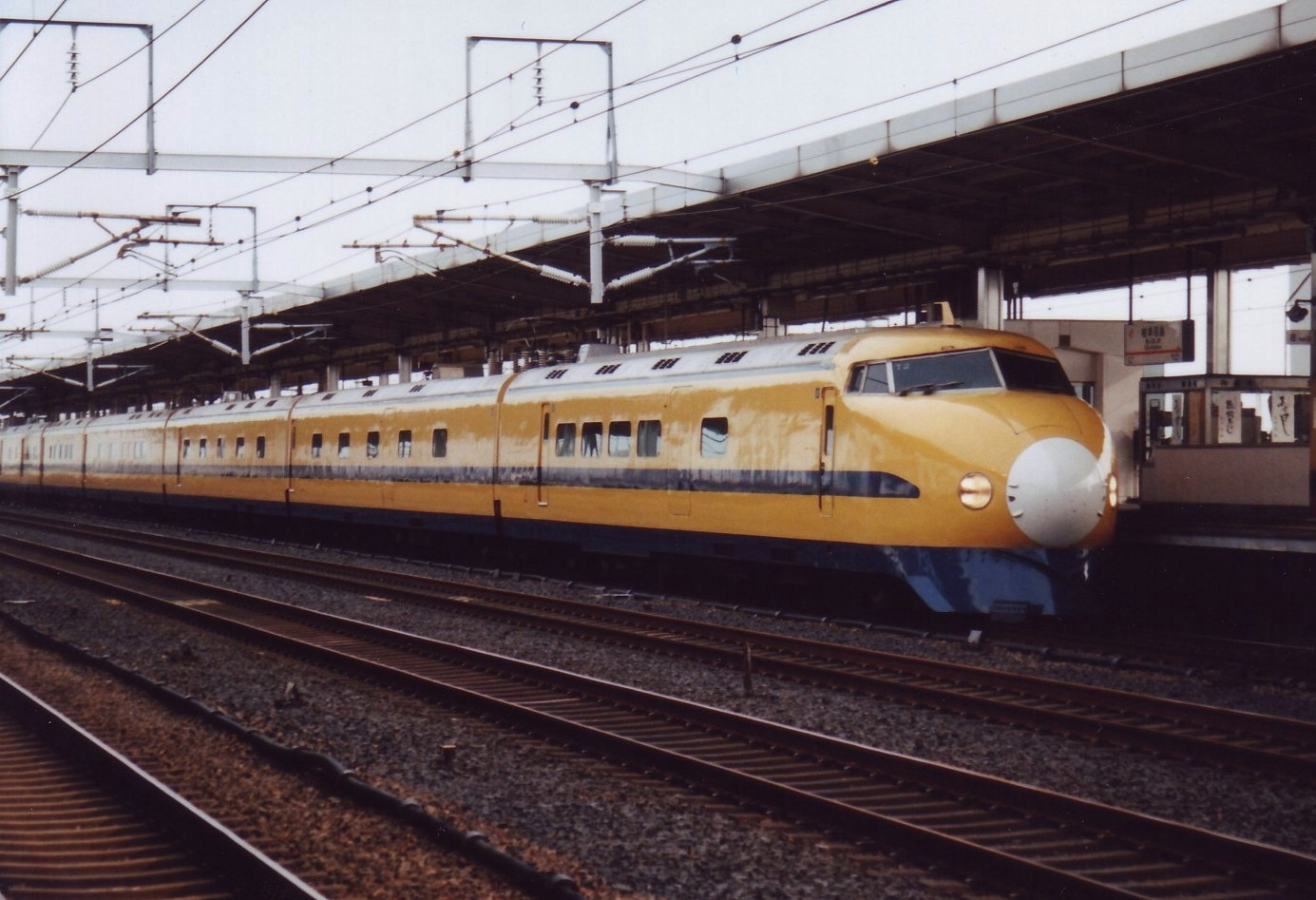
JR Central Class 922 set T2, October 1998

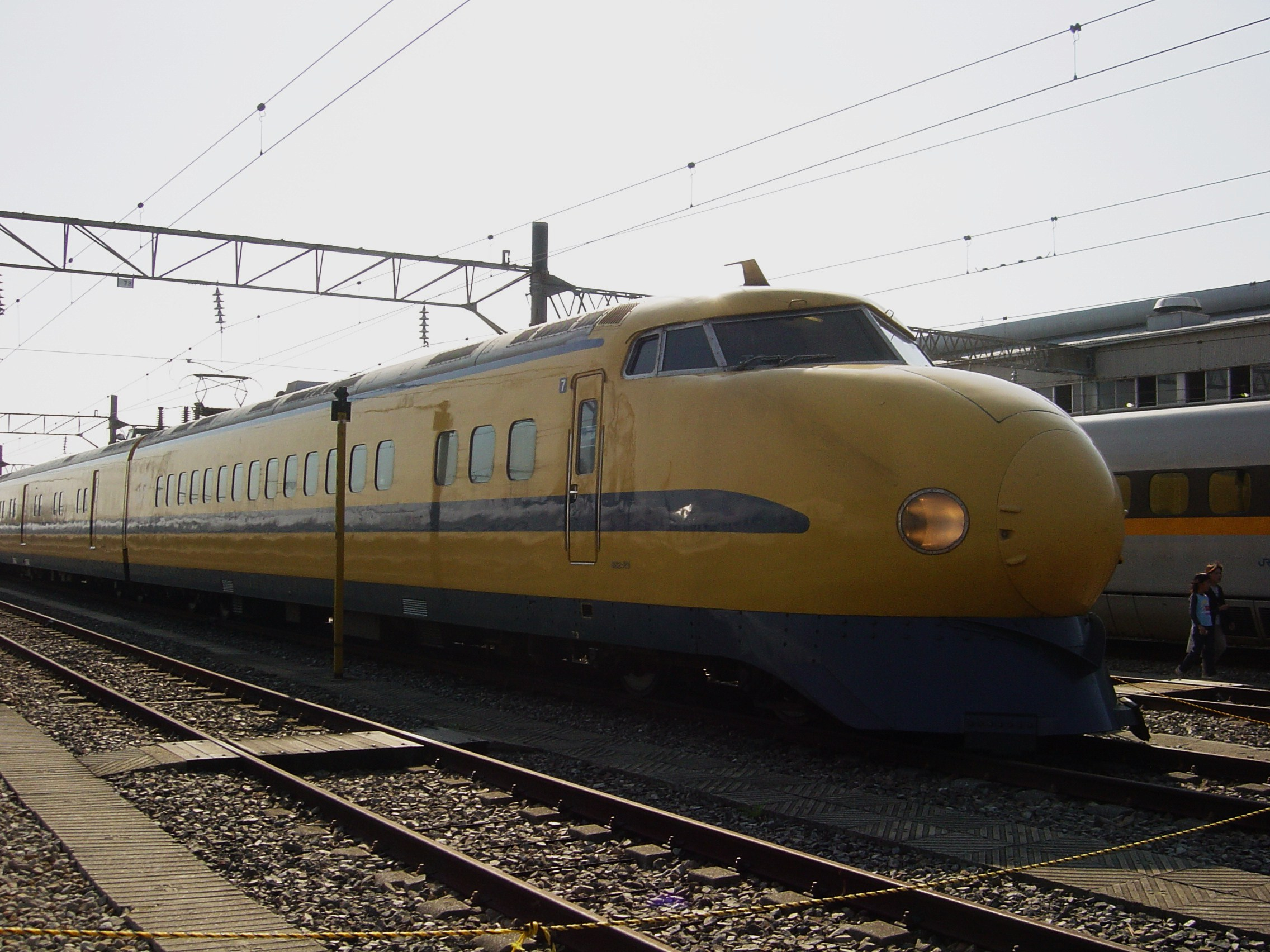
JR West Class 922 set T3, October 2004

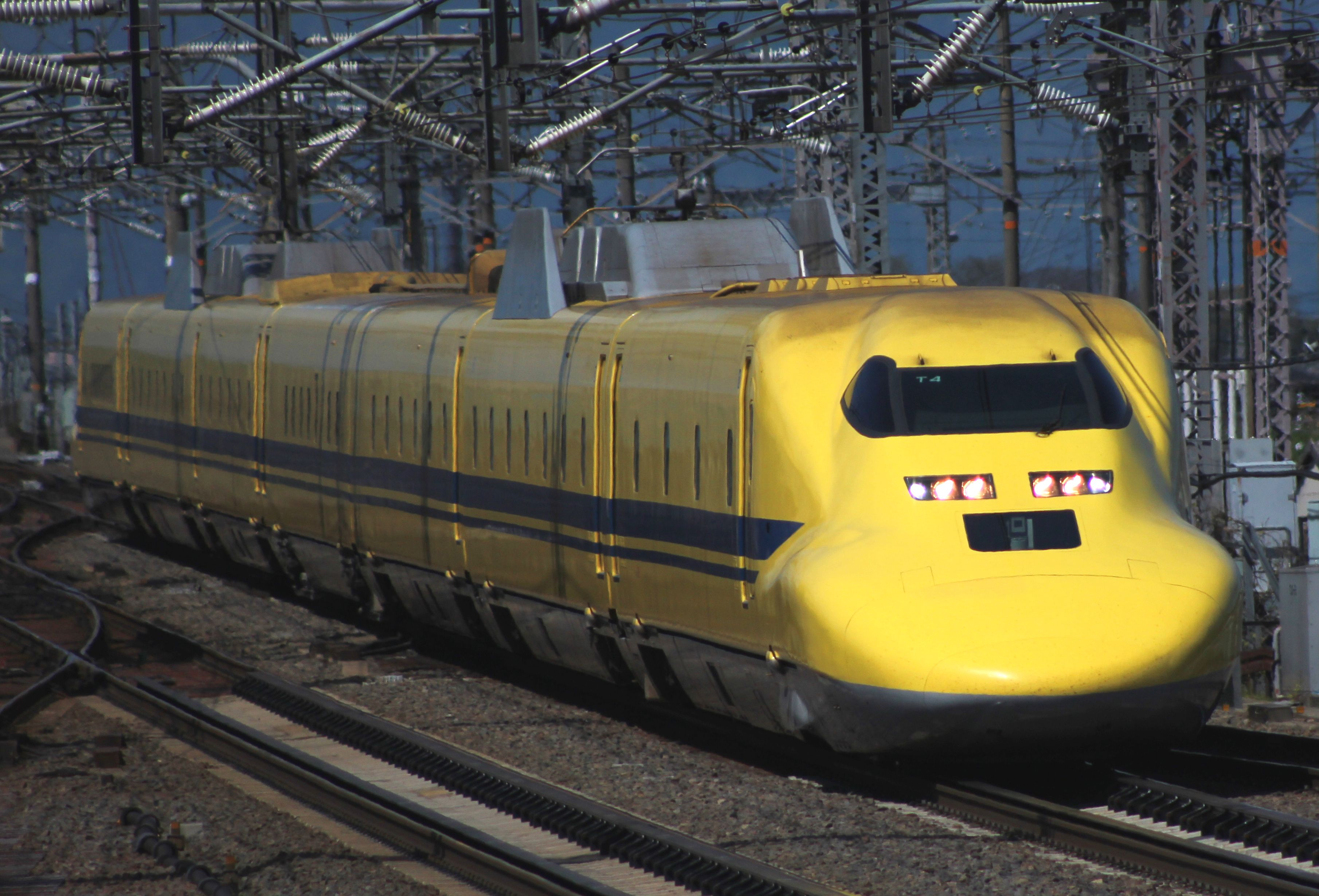
JR Central Class 923 set T4, April 2013

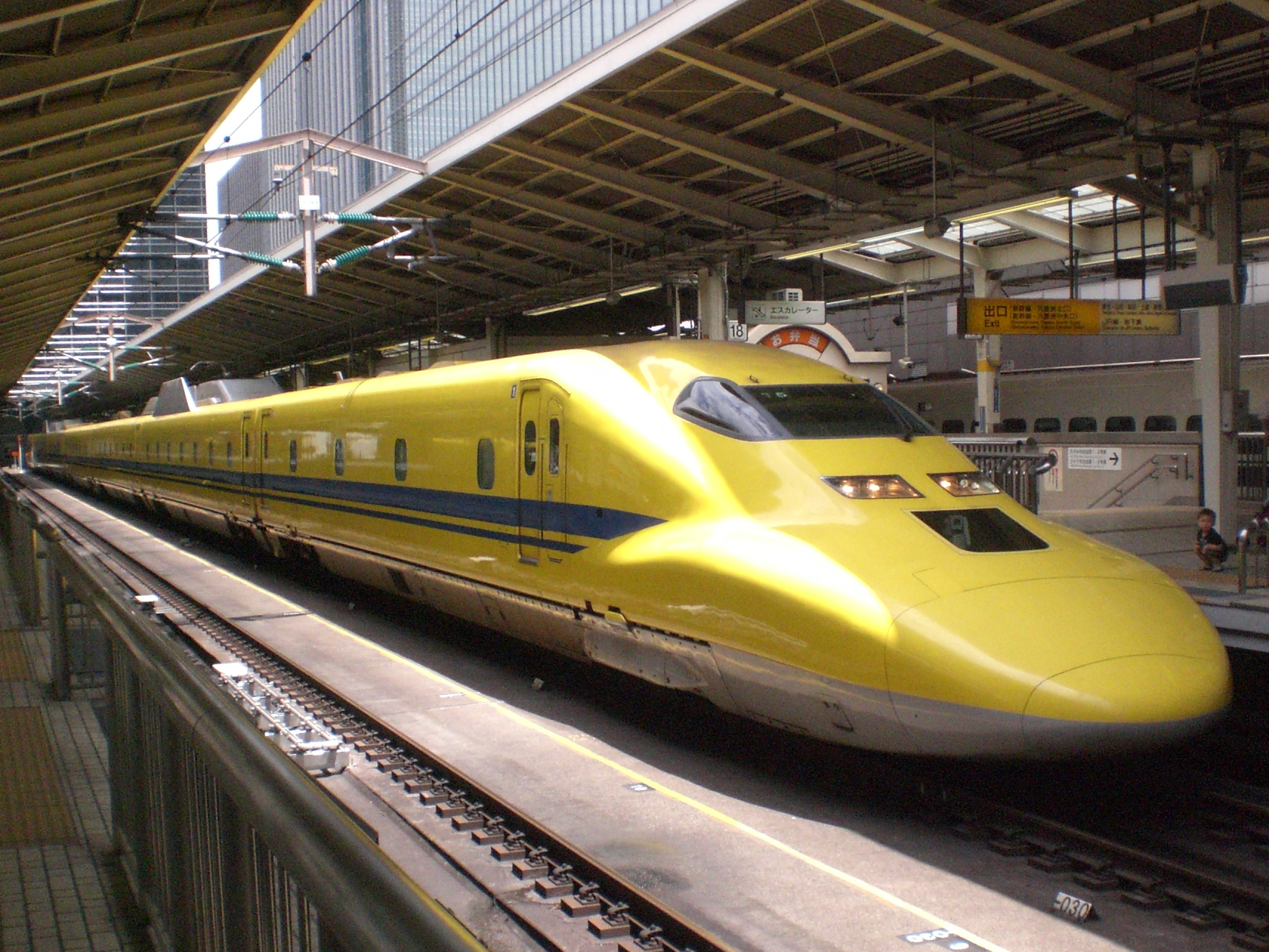
JR West Class 923 set T5, July 2008

=== For Tōhoku, Jōetsu, Hokuriku, Hokkaido, Yamagata, and Akita Shinkansen ===
- 200 series type (Yellow with green stripe):
  - 925/0 (Set S1): 7-car set owned by JR East. Delivered in 1979 and retired in 2001.
  - 925/10 (Set S2): 7-car set owned by JR East. Converted from former Class 962 test train in 1982 and retired in 2002.
- E3 series type (White with red stripe)
  - E926 (Set S51): "East i" 6-car set owned by JR East. Delivered in August 2001.
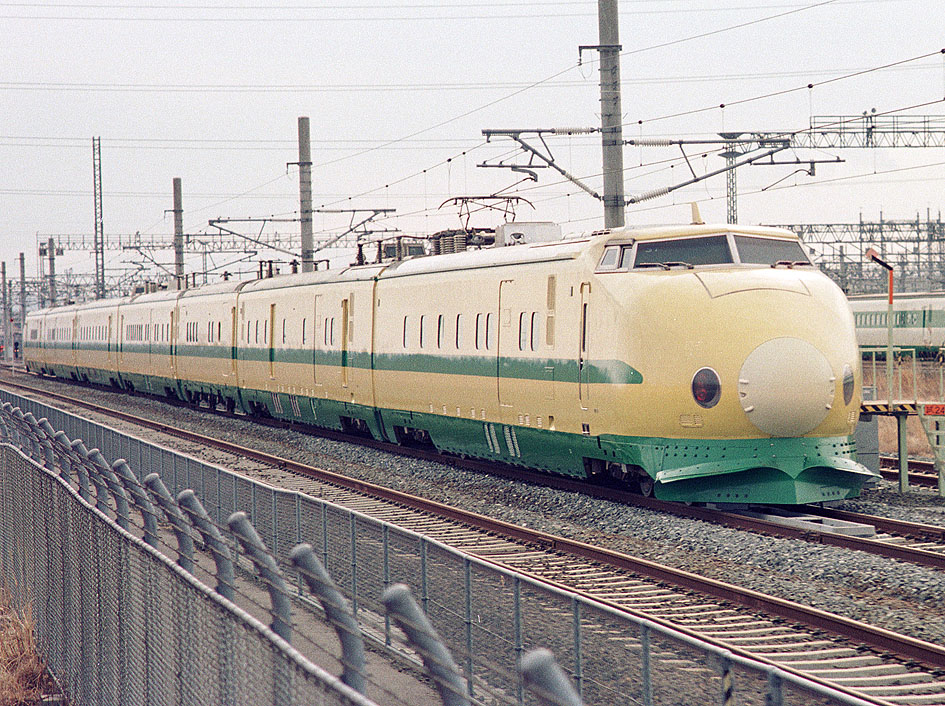
Class 925 set S1, 1987

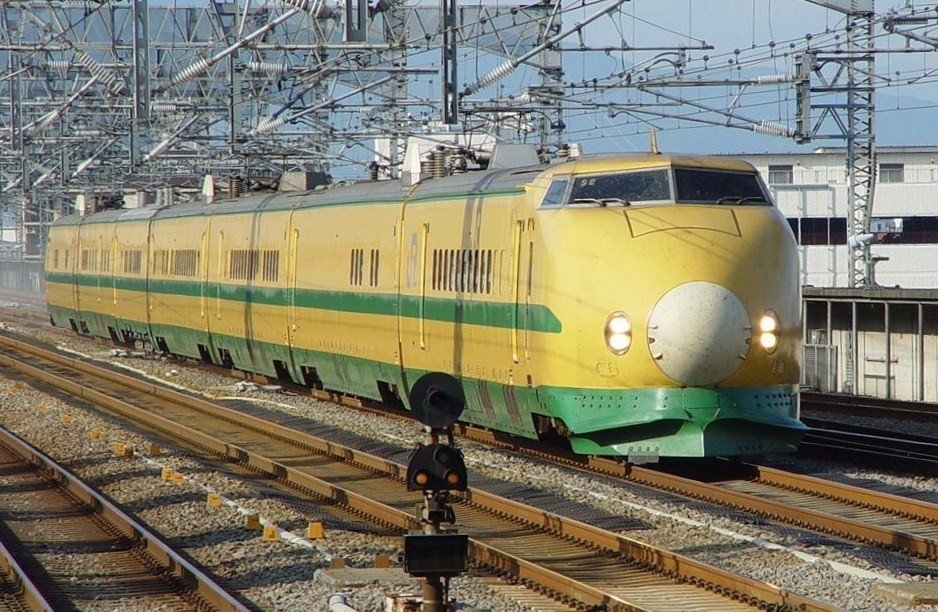
Class 925-10 set S2, September 2002

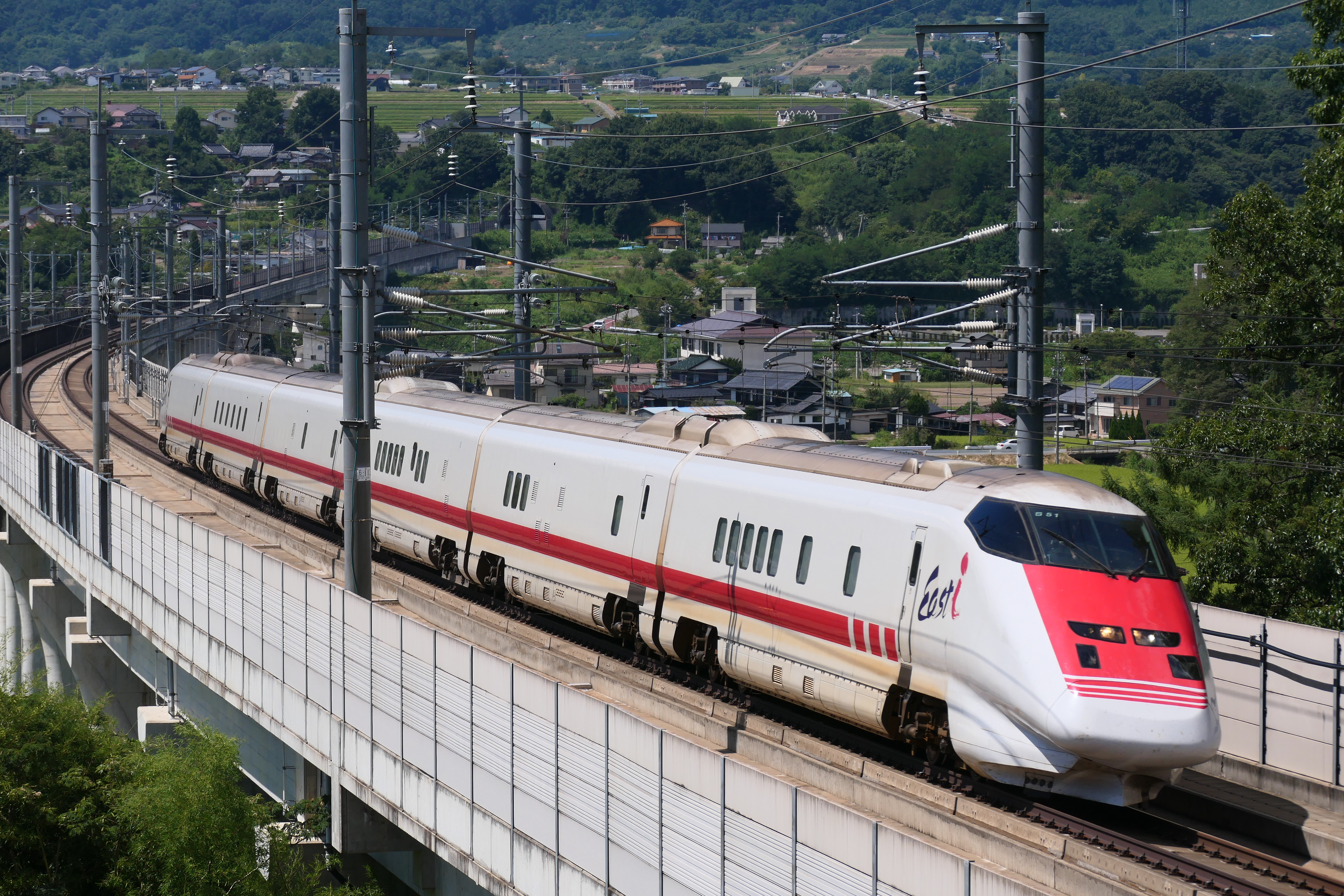
E926 East i train, August 2020

== Interior (Class 923) ==
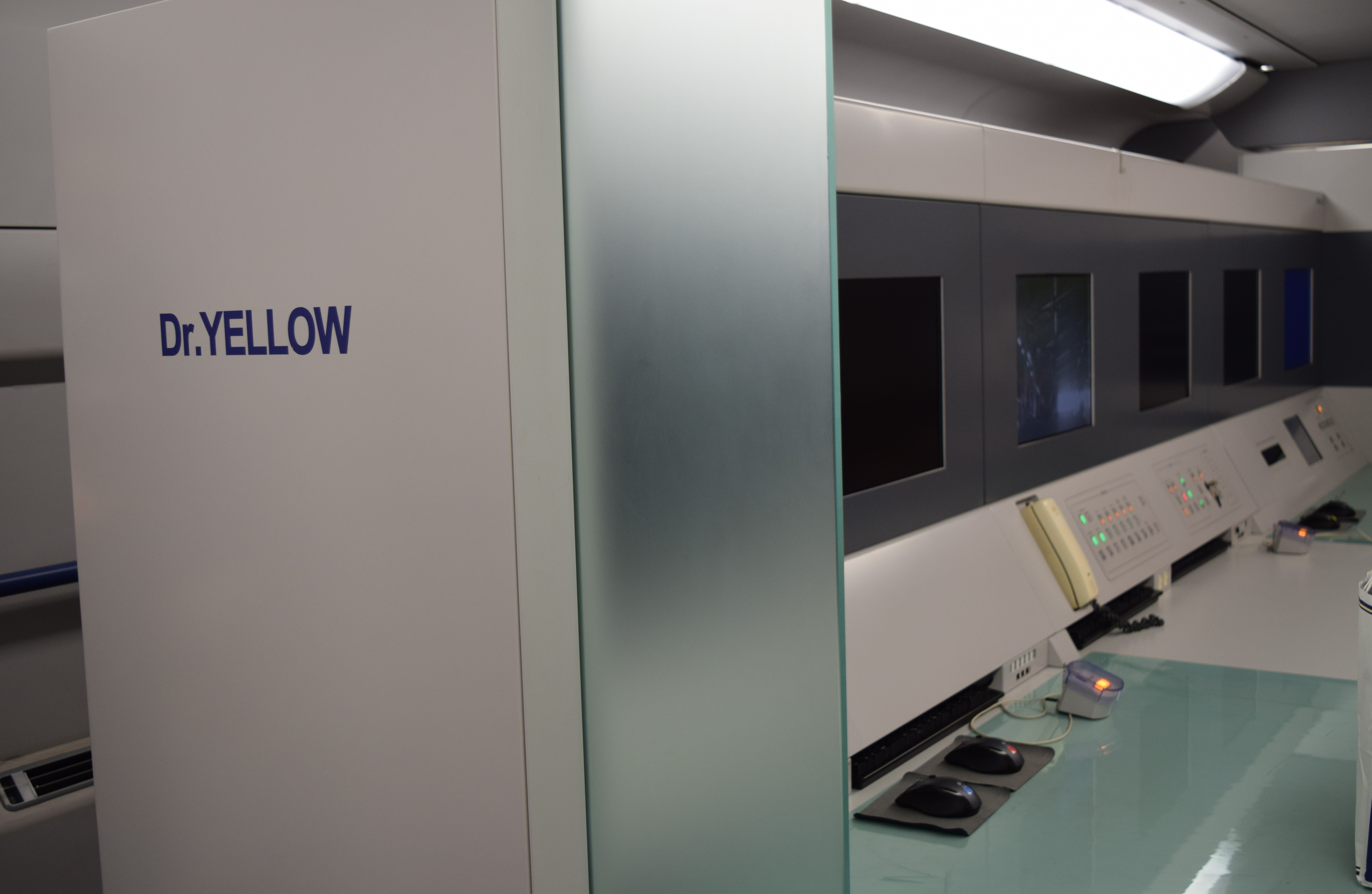
Interior of car number 1 used to inspect signalling, communications and power

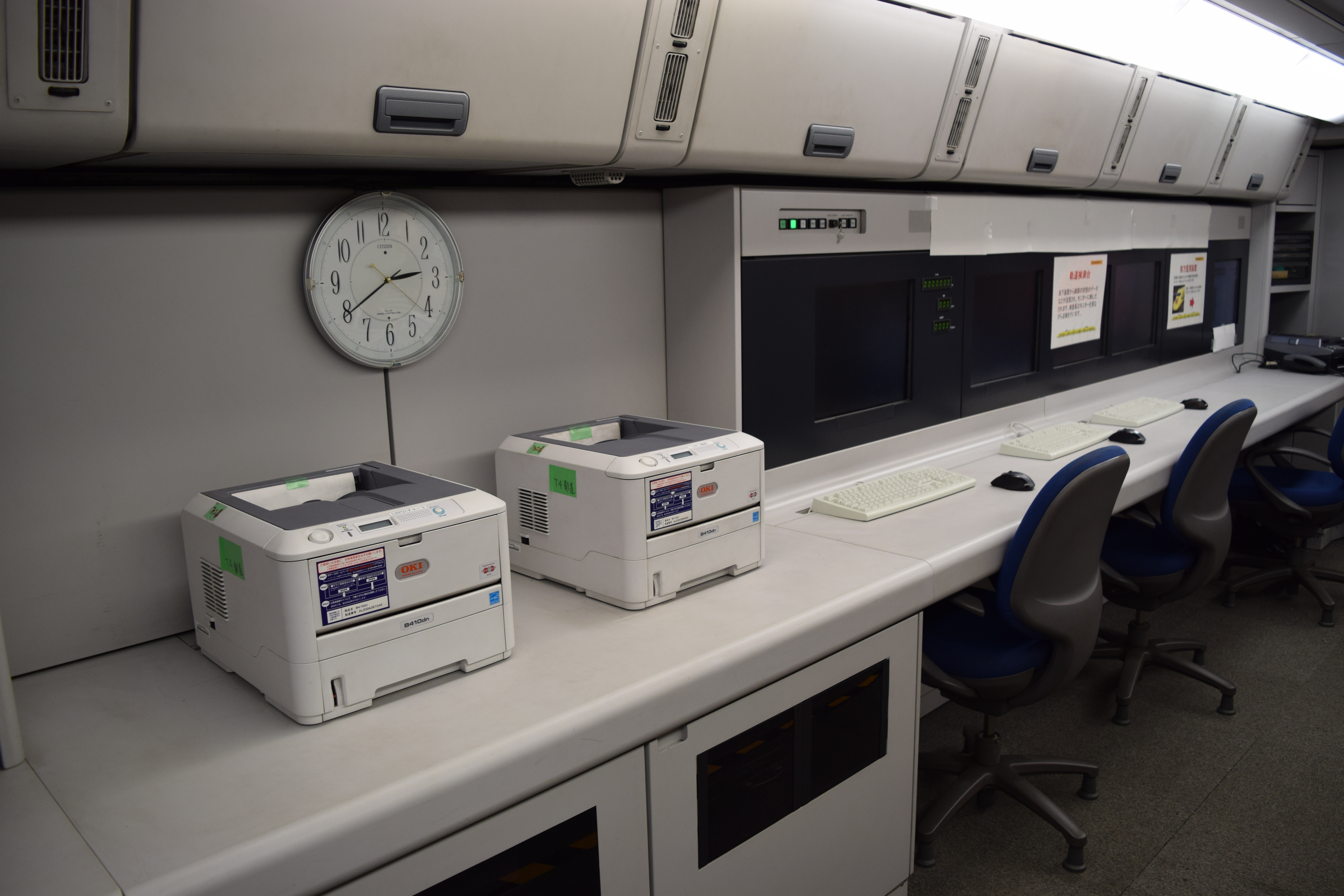
Interior of car number 2 used to measure electricity

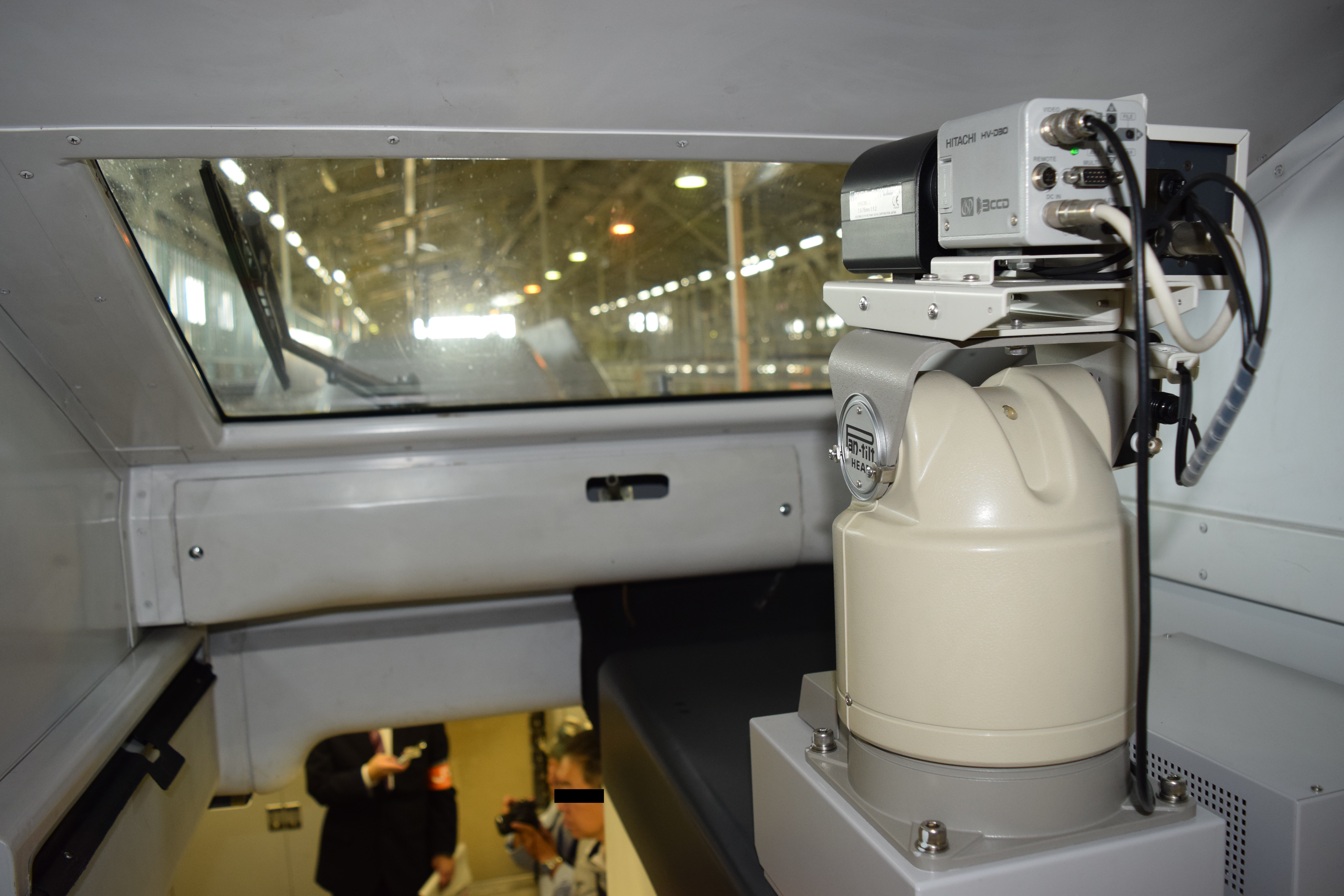
Observation window in car number 3

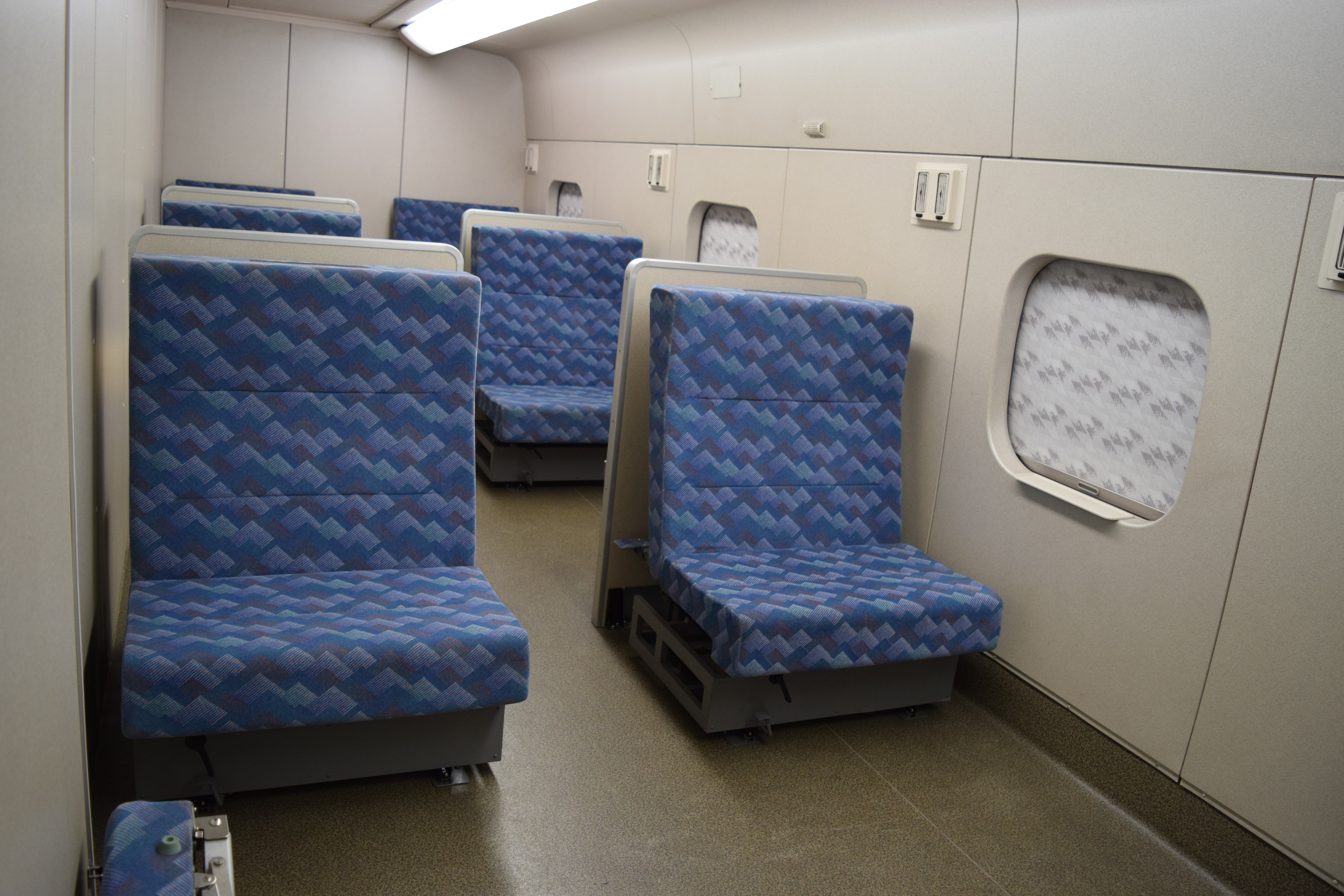
Seats in car number 5

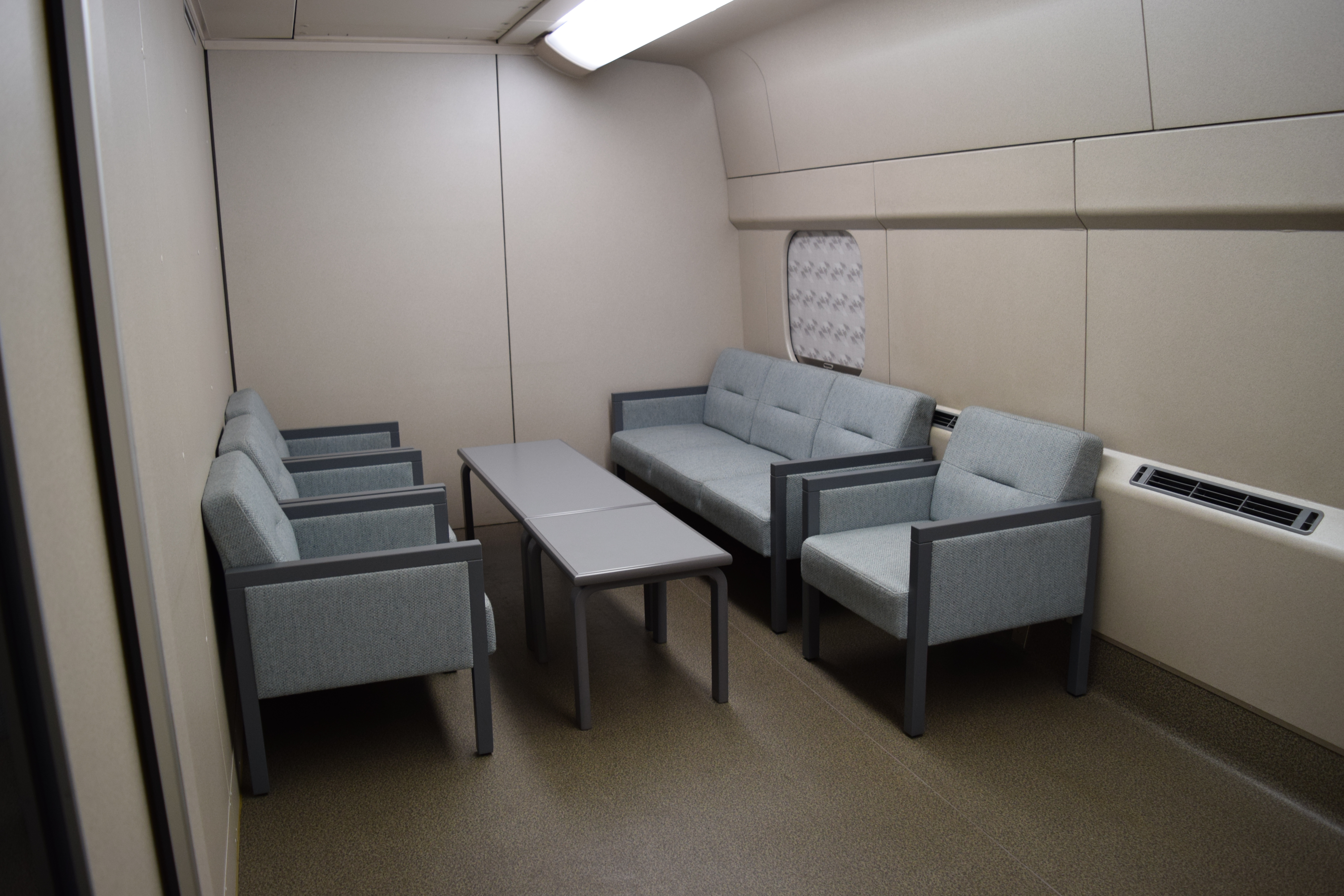
A meeting table in car number 6

== Retirement from JR Central Services ==
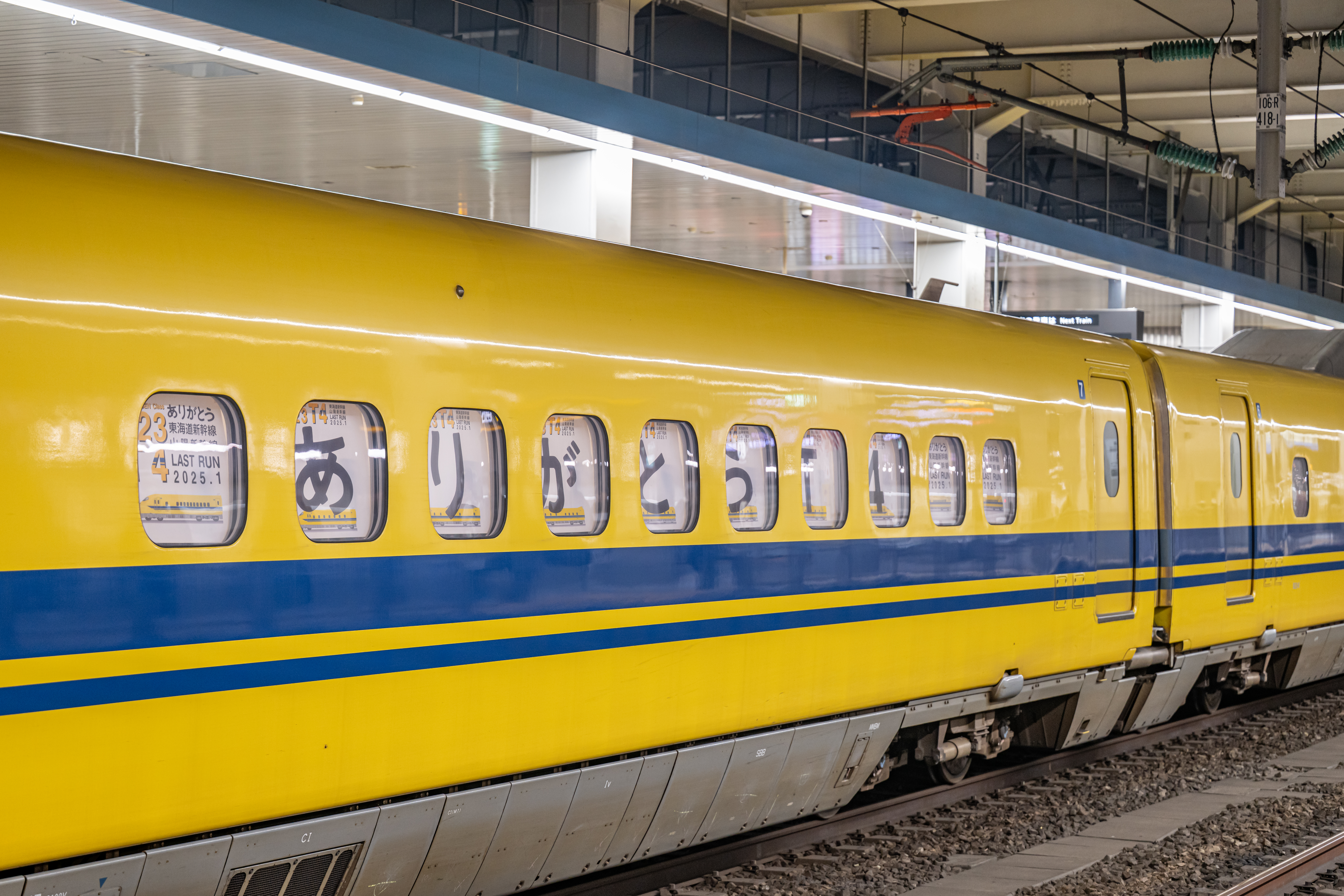
The wording on the windows of set T4 saying "ありがとうT4" (Thank You T4) on 28 January 2025, one day before its retirement

On 29 January 2025, the T4 set Doctor Yellow departed from Tokyo Station bound for Hakata Station for its final run on the Tokaido Shinkansen before its retirement, and for this special occasion, "ありがとうT4" (Thank You T4) was decorated on its windows. After Doctor Yellow's retirement, JR Central plans to use N700S Series units equipped with inspection tools to patrol its tracks.

== Preserved examples ==
Currently, two examples of the Doctor Yellow units have been preserved:

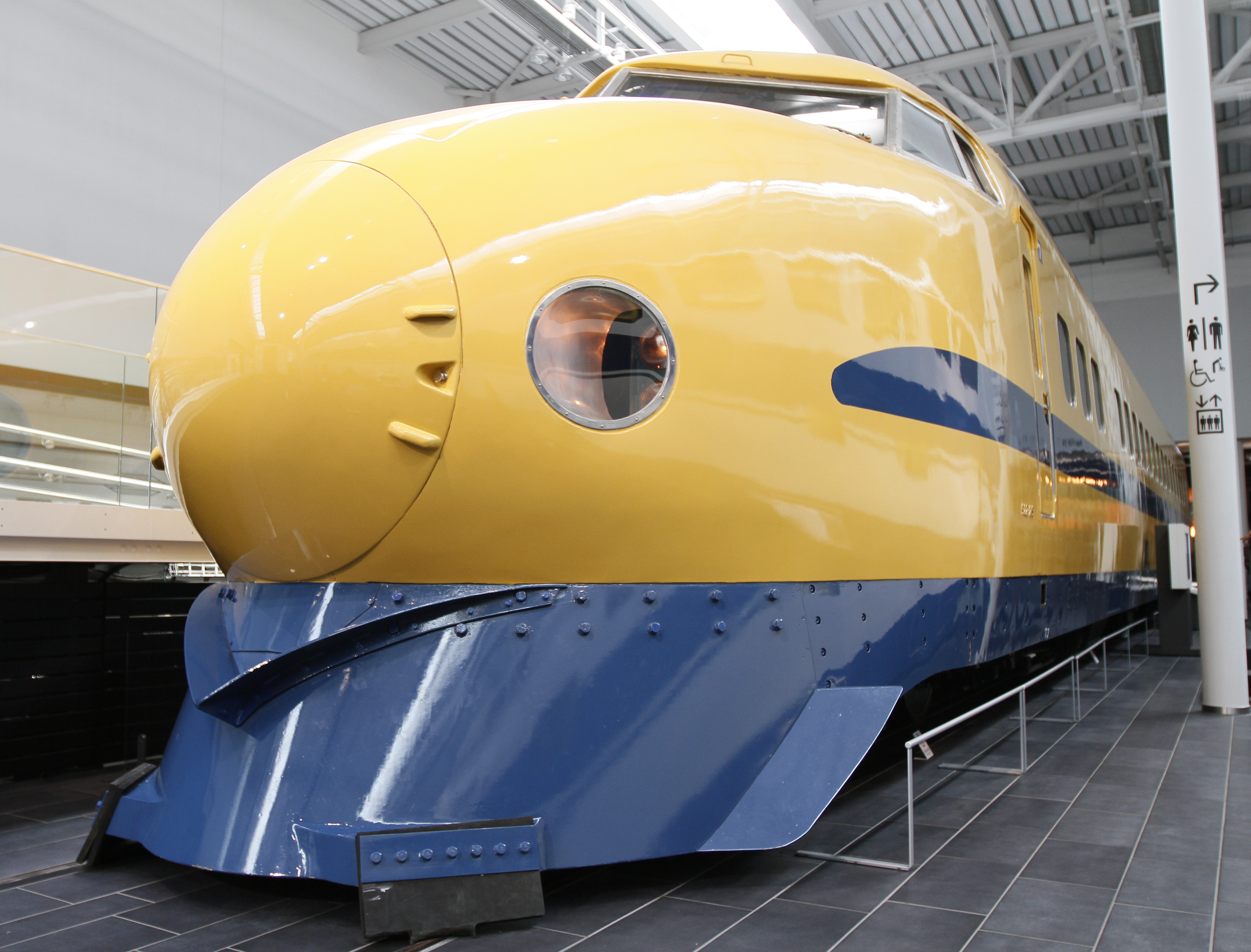
Preserved Doctor Yellow car 922-26 inside the SCMaglev and Railway Park, March 2011

- 922-26 (ex-set T3, built 1979 by Hitachi) at SCMaglev and Railway Park, Nagoya, since March 2011. It is due to be moved to Hakusan, Ishikawa Prefecture sometime after May 2025.
- T4 (debuted in 2001) at SCMaglev and Railway Park, Nagoya

== See also ==
- Comprehensive Inspection Train, used to evaluate the condition of the China Railway High-speed network.
- New Measurement Train, the British equivalent of Doctor Yellow, used to assess the condition of track
- TGV Iris 320, the French counterpart of Doctor Yellow, used to monitor the condition of the French tracks (mainly the high-speed railways LGV) used by high-speed trains, as well as High Speed 1 in the United Kingdom.
