= Class 961 Shinkansen =

Japanese prototype Shinkansen train

Class 961
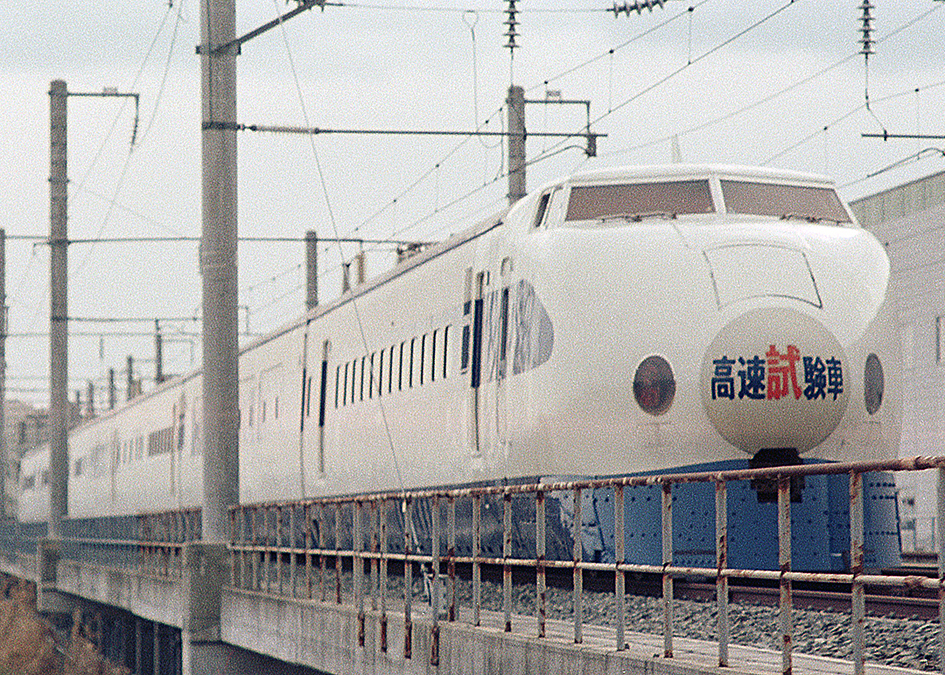
- Class 961 at Sendai Shinkansen Depot in 1987
- In service: 1973–1981
- Manufacturers: Hitachi, Kawasaki Heavy Industries, Nippon Sharyo
- Constructed: 1973
- Number built: 6 vehicles
- Number preserved: 2 vehicles
- Number scrapped: 4 vehicles
- Formation: 6 cars
- Fleet numbers: S3
- Operator: JNR

Specifications
- Car body construction: Aluminium alloy
- Car length: 25,000 mm (82 ft 0 in)
- Width: 3,380 mm (11 ft 1 in)
- Height: 4,490 mm (14 ft 9 in)
- Doors: 2 sliding doors per side
- Maximum speed: 260 km/h (160 mph) (nominal)
- Traction system: MT920
- Power output: 6.6 MW (8,900 hp) (275 kW or 369 hp per motor)
- Electric system: 25 kV AC, 50/60 Hz overhead catenary
- Current collection: PS9013 pantograph
- Bogies: DT9013
- Safety system: ATC/ATO
- Track gauge: 1,435 mm (4 ft 8 1/2 in)

The Class 961 (961形) was a 6-car experimental Japanese Shinkansen train operated by Japanese National Railways (JNR) between 1973 and 1981.

== Design ==
The Class 961 train was developed to test new technology and design features to be incorporated in future high-speed trains for use on the planned Tōhoku Shinkansen and Jōetsu Shinkansen routes in the north-east of Japan. It featured motors in all six cars and was designed to cope with operations in the cold and snowy conditions of north-eastern Japan.

A number of interior accommodation configurations were tested, including a restaurant car, compartments, and sleeping berths.

== Formation ==
The set, designated "S3", was formed as follows.

Car No.	1	2	3	4	5	6
Designation	Mc	M'	M	M'	M	M'c
Numbering	961-1	961-2	961-3	961-4	961-5	961-6

=== 961-1 ===
Built by Kawasaki Heavy Industries. Standard seating car based on the 0 series configuration with 3+2-abreast flip-over reversible seating.

=== 961-2 ===
Built by Kawasaki Heavy Industries. Standard seating car based on the 0 series configuration.

=== 961-3 ===
Built by Nippon Sharyo. Restaurant car interior was added at Hamamatsu Works in 1974.

=== 961-4 ===
Built by Nippon Sharyo. Sleeping car accommodation was added at Hamamatsu Works in 1974, including 4-berth semi-open couchette compartments, longitudinally arranged sleeping berths and deluxe sleeping compartments.

=== 961-5 ===
Built by Hitachi. This car was used exclusively for test equipment. It had no side windows and instead had four large doorways on each side for installing and removing equipment.

=== 961-6 ===
Built by Hitachi. Standard seating car based on the 0 series configuration.

== History ==
The train was unveiled on 9 July 1973.

From 17 July 1973, test running commenced on the Sanyō Shinkansen between Shin-Ōsaka and Himeji as a 4-car set. Test running as a 6-car formation commenced on 1 August 1973 on the Tōkaidō Shinkansen between Hamamatsu and Nagoya. Test running was suspended thereafter owing to the effects of the 1973 oil crisis.

From 16 September 1974, the train was tested on the unopened section of the Sanyō Shinkansen between Okayama and Fukuyama, but the maximum speed was limited to 210 km/h (130 mph) due to opposition from lineside residents related to noise levels. The train was put into storage following the opening of the Sanyō Shinkansen extension in March 1975.

On 11 May 1979, the Class 961 was transferred from storage at Ōi Depot in Tokyo (now JR Central's Tokyo No. 2 Shinkansen Depot) by road to the shinkansen depot at Oyama in Tochigi Prefecture for use on the "Oyama Test Track" section of the Tōhoku Shinkansen then under construction. Test running started on 5 June 1979, and the lettering "高速試験車" (High-Speed Test Train) was added to the nose section of the train from 9 June.

On 7 December 1979, the Class 961 recorded a world speed record of 319 km/h (198 mph) on the Oyama Test Track, breaking the previous world record of 286 km/h (178 mph) set by the Class 951 Shinkansen in 1972.

Following the opening of the Tōhoku Shinkansen in 1981, the Class 961's role as a test train ended, and it was stored at Sendai Shinkansen Depot. It was officially withdrawn on 10 August 1990.

== Preservation ==
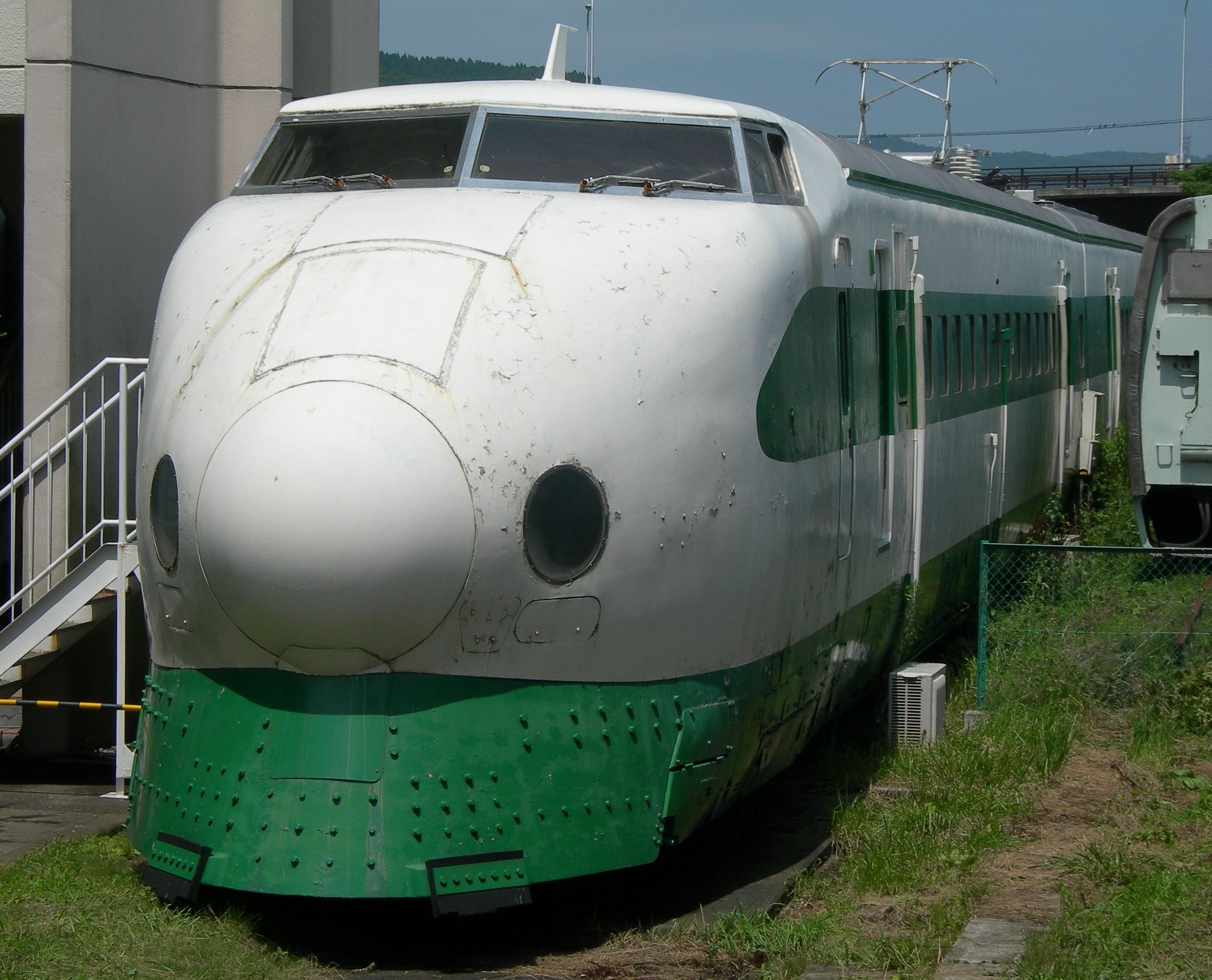
Car 961-1 at Sendai Shinkansen Depot in July 2009

End cars 961-1 and 961-6 are preserved outdoors at Sendai Shinkansen Depot. These cars have been repainted into "Tōhoku Shinkansen" ivory and green livery. A brass plaque commemorating the world speed record of 319 km/h (198 mph) set by this train in 1979 is displayed inside car 951-1 at Kokubunji in Tokyo.
