= Class 1000 Shinkansen =

Two prototype Japanese Shinkansen trains

Class 1000
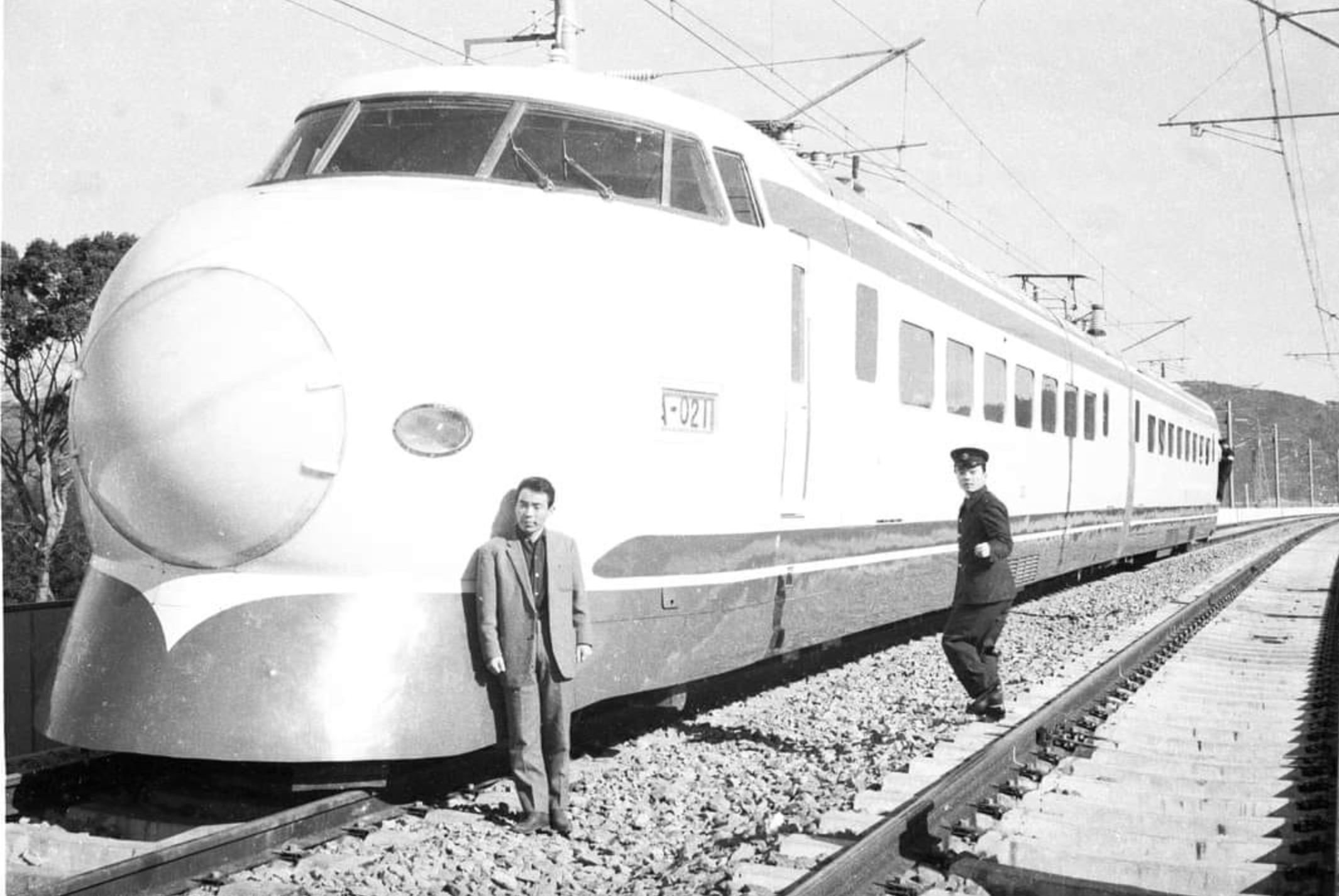
- Class 1000 Shinkansen set A
- In service: 1962–1976
- Manufacturers: Hitachi; Kawasaki Sharyo; Kisha Seizo; Kinki Sharyo; Nippon Sharyo
- Constructed: 1961–1962
- Scrapped: 1975–1976
- Number built: 6 vehicles (2 sets)
- Number preserved: 0
- Formation: 2 or 4 cars per trainset
- Fleet numbers: A/B set
- Operator: Japanese National Railways

Specifications
- Car body construction: Steel
- Car length: 25 m (82 ft)
- Width: 3.38 m (11 ft 1 in)
- Doors: 2 externally opening sliding doors per side
- Electric system: Overhead line, 25 kV 60 Hz AC
- Current collection: Pantograph
- Track gauge: 1,435 mm (4 ft 8 1/2 in) standard gauge

Class 1000 (Japanese: 1000形) was the classification given to the two prototype Japanese Shinkansen trains built for high-speed testing ahead of the opening of the Tōkaidō Shinkansen in 1964.

== Formations ==
=== Set A ===
1. 1001 (Mc) built by Kisha Seizo, seating capacity 56 (actual 16), DT9002 bogies
2. 1002 (MDc) built by Nippon Sharyo, seating capacity 80, DT9001 bogies

=== Set B ===
1. 1003 (Mc) built by Hitachi, seating capacity 70, DT9006 bogies
2. 1004 (MD) built by Hitachi, seating capacity 100, DT9004 bogies
3. 1005 (M) built by Kawasaki Sharyo, seating capacity 80, DT9005 bogies
4. 1006 (MDc) built by Kinki Sharyo, seating capacity 80, DT9003 bogies

== Construction ==
All vehicles were of welded steel construction, and had rounded cab windows except for car 1006 which had an angular design which was ultimately used on the production 0 series vehicles. Due to differing vehicle construction, car 1004 in set B had unusual elongated hexagonal windows. Among the features not continued on the production 0 series units were externally sliding doors, and a translucent nose section illuminated from inside by fifteen 20 W fluorescent tubes. Cars 1002, 1004 and 1006 were fitted with auxiliary pantographs adjacent to the main pantographs.

== Interior ==
Internally, each car featured a different seating configuration for assessment, as described below.

Car 1001 featured two rows each of rotating unidirectional 1st class and 2nd class seating arranged 2+2 abreast. These seats were the same as those used on 151 series limited express EMUs.

Car 1002 featured 2nd class seating arranged in back-to-back seating bays, 2+3 abreast with armrests. Seating pitch was 1,900 mm (74.80 in).

Car 1003 featured 2nd class flip-over reversible seating, 2+3 abreast with a seating pitch of 950 mm (37.40 in). This was the design ultimately used on the first production 0 series sets.

Car 1004 featured 2nd class flip-over reversible seating, 2+3 abreast with a seating pitch of 950 mm (37.40 in). The design differed from that used in car 1003 in that the seat backs were single-sided.

Car 1005 featured second-class seating arranged in 1,300 mm (51.18 in) wide back-to-back express-style seating bays, 3+3 with no armrests. Seating pitch was 1,900 mm (74.80 in).

Car 1006 featured second-class seating arranged in back-to-back seating bays, 2+3 abreast with armrests. Seating pitch was 1,900 mm (74.80 in).

Cars 1001, 1003, and 1005 had toilets and washbasins, Japanese and western style in cars 1001 and 1003, and both Japanese style in car 1005. Urinals were also provided – the first time on general Japanese trains other than dedicated school-trip EMUs.

== History ==
The first car to be built, 1001, was delivered on 16 April 1962 from Tokyo Kisha's factory in Kōtō, Tokyo, and transferred by road and rail to Nippon Sharyo's Warabi factory in Kawaguchi, Saitama on 17 April. The two-car set A was then unveiled to the press at Nippon Sharyo on 25 April 1962.

Test running was performed on the 32-kilometre (20 mi) "model track" test section between Kamonomiya in Odawara and Ayase in Kanagawa Prefecture from 26 June 1962. A speed of 190 kilometres per hour (118 mph) was first recorded on 27 October 1962 by set B, breaking the previous record of 175 km/h (109 mph) set by the 1,067 mm (3 ft 6 in) narrow-gauge KuMoYa 93 test train on 21 November 1960. A speed of 200 km/h (124 mph) was first recorded on 31 October 1962 by set B, 210 km/h (130 mph) was reached on 20 December 1962, 243 km/h (151 mph) was recorded on 19 March 1963, and on 30 March 1963, set B recorded a speed record of 256 km/h (159 mph).

With the start of test-running and trial service on the Tōkaidō Shinkansen between Tokyo and Osaka in June 1964, set A was reclassified asa Class 941 emergency relief train (cars 941-1 and 941-2), and set B as a Class 922 track and overhead wire inspection train (set T1) (cars 922-1–4). The Class 941 remained out of use at Osaka Depot, and the Class 922 set was active until the new Class 922/10 set, T2, was delivered in 1974.

All six prototype cars were cut up at Hamamatsu Works between 1975 and 1976, being used to test the cutting-up facilities ahead of the first batch of 360 0 series cars due for withdrawal.
