= Class 951 Shinkansen =

Experimental Japanese shinkansen train

Class 951
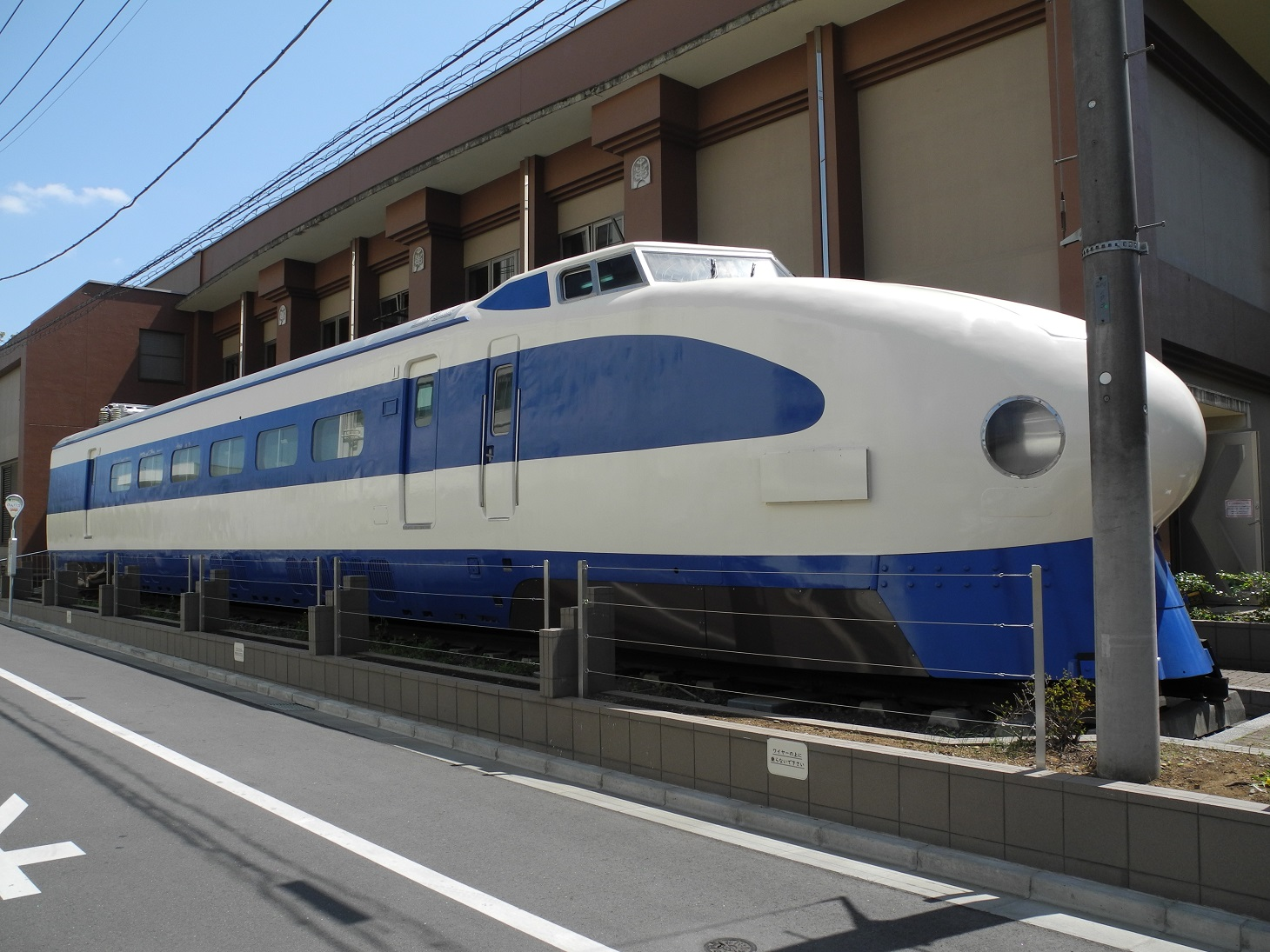
- 951-1 preserved in Kokubunji, Tokyo, April 2021
- In service: 1969–1973
- Manufacturers: Kawasaki Sharyo, Nippon Sharyo
- Constructed: 1969
- Scrapped: 2008
- Number built: 2 vehicles
- Number preserved: 1 vehicle
- Number scrapped: 1 vehicle
- Formation: 2 cars
- Capacity: 40 seated (Car 951-1); 50 seated (Car 951-2)
- Operator: JNR

Specifications
- Car body construction: Aluminium alloy
- Car length: 25,000 mm (82 ft 0.25 in)
- Width: 3,386 mm (11 ft 1.31 in)
- Doors: 2 sliding doors per side
- Maximum speed: 250 km/h (155 mph) (nominal)
- Traction system: 250 kW (340 hp) x 8
- Power output: 2,000 kW (2,700 hp)
- Electric system: 25 kV AC, 60 Hz overhead catenary
- Current collection: Cross-arm type pantograph
- Track gauge: 1,435 mm (4 ft 8 1/2 in) standard gauge

The Class 951 (Japanese: 951形) was an experimental Japanese Shinkansen train built to test the technology for future high-speed trains operating at speeds of up to 250 km/h (155 mph) following the opening of the Tokaido Shinkansen in 1964.

== Formation ==
The Class 951 train was a two-car unit formed of cars numbered 951-1 and 951-2. Car 951-1 was built by Kawasaki Sharyo (present-day Kawasaki Heavy Industries), and had a seating capacity of 40 with seats arranged 3+2 abreast. Car 951-2 was built by Nippon Sharyo, and had a seating capacity of 50, also with seats arranged 3+2 abreast.

1. 951-1 (Mc)
2. 951-2 (M'c)

Both cars were fitted with a cross-arm type pantograph at the inner end. Both were based on the PS200 type used on the 0 Series Shinkansen trains, but the pantograph on car 951-1 was designated PS9010K, and that on car 951-2 was designated PS-1010A. Normally, only the pantograph on car 951-2 was used.

== History ==
The train was unveiled to the press on 26 March 1969, with formal test running commencing on the Tōkaidō Shinkansen from 2 July 1969.

On 24 February 1972, the Class 951 recorded a speed record of 286 km/h (178 mph) on the Sanyo Shinkansen between Himeji and Nishi-Akashi, breaking the previous record of 256 km/h (159 mph) set by the Class 1000 Shinkansen.

The train was formally withdrawn on 11 April 1980. Car 951-2 was transferred to the Railway Technical Research Institute in Kokubunji, Tokyo, where it was used for roller rig testing. Car 951-1 was donated to the nearby Hikari Plaza Community Centre in 1994, where it is open to the public. Car 951-2 was subsequently stored out of use inside the Railway Technical Research Institute, and was cut up in 2008.
