= DOY =

Doy is a given name and surname (see there for a list of people with the name).

DOY or DoY may refer to:

- Day of year
- Duke of York
- Duchess of York
- Department of Youth (disambiguation)
- Dongying Shengli Airport (IATA code)

== See also ==
- No Doy
- DOI (disambiguation)
