= Hikarian =

Japanese media franchise

ヒカリアン
- Genre: Mecha, Superhero
- Created by: Tomy; Artmic
- Original video animation

Pilot
- Directed by: Chikae Kuwahara
- Produced by: Iori Suzuki
- Written by: Hiroyuki Fukushima
- Music by: Takumi Kusanagi
- Studio: Artmic & Tokyo Kids
- Released: 1996
- Runtime: 25 minutes
- Episodes: 1 (3 segments)
- Anime television series

Super Express Hikarian
- Directed by: Kazuyuki Hirokawa (#1–51); Yoshikata Nitta (#52–154)
- Produced by: Iori Suzuki
- Written by: Toshiki Inoue; Hideki Shirane
- Music by: Yuzo Hayashi
- Studio: Tokyo Kids
- Original network: TV Tokyo
- Original run: April 2, 1997 – March 29, 2000
- Episodes: 154 (+2 s.e.)
- Anime television series

Ultra Radiant Express Hikarian
- Directed by: Hideaki Ōba
- Produced by: Iori Suzuki
- Written by: Toshiki Inoue
- Music by: Yuzo Hayashi
- Studio: Tokyo Kids
- Licensed by: US: Enoki Films
- Original network: TV Tokyo
- Original run: April 7, 2002 – March 30, 2003
- Episodes: 52

Hikarian (ヒカリアン), also called Hikarian: Great Railroad Protector, is a Japanese anime and toy franchise by Tomy.

The first television series, Chō Tokkyū Hikarian (超特急ヒカリアン; lit. "Super Express Hikarian"), is about a series of bullet trains that are turned into robots. The robots, along with two humans named Tetsuyuki Shinbashi (新橋 テツユキ Shinbashi Tetsuyuki) and Minayo Kanda (神田 ミナヨ Kanda Minayo), have to stop an alien invasion. Some of the OVAs even appeared after Tomica VHS tapes.

A second television series, Denkō Chō Tokkyū Hikarian (電光超特急ヒカリアン; lit. "Ultra Radiant Express Hikarian"), was later created. The new series stars a new Hikarian, Lightning West, and a new human lead, Kenta Hijiribashi (聖橋 ケンタ Hijiribashi Kenta).

Enoki Films has licensed the series for an English release. The company has suggested name changes (e.g. Tetsuyuki becomes Terry and Minayo becomes Mina), but the series is not yet available in English, and Enoki may sublicense the series to another company who may decide to keep the original Japanese names, use Enoki's suggested English names, or use original English names.

== Characters ==
The main characters in Hikarian are the Hikarians who fight against the Blatcher gang and their plan operation Darkness. All of the characters, except the Black Express, are based on real life trains. The series depicts them operating as normal trains during times of peace.

=== Hikarians ===
- Nozomi: The main character that changes from the 300 series. He is cheerful, bright, and a bit of a scatterbrain. In his free time, he drives a remote control buggy (RC buggy → Mini 4WD). His special move is "Sky Sunday," which amplifies the sunlight with his sun shield. However, it cannot be used when the sky is dark. To cover this weakness, he later uses his new special move "Stardust Stream," which shoots a purple star-shaped beam from his star shield, and "Perfect Sky Sunday," which shoots from his perfect shield. After episode 105 of the TV series (when Nozomi returns to Earth), he has grown so much that he can no longer transform with the same energy as before, and he can only transform when he is traveling at a speed of 275 km/h, which requires more energy to be supplied. Weapons include Hand Sword, Sky Sword, Sun Shield, Star Shield, and Perfect Shield.
- Tsubasa: He changed from the 400 series to a Hikarian, becoming the second Hikarian after Nozomi. He is a good friend of Nozomi, and is the second most likely to be together after Tetsuyuki. He is not good with ghosts, and when a ghost of a steam locomotive (actually a 3D image of Blatcher) appeared on the tracks in his area of responsibility, he refused to go. He takes care of K-kun as his big brother. His weapons are the Slasher Wing and the Wind Shield. In episode 108 of the TV series, he defeated Blatcher with a combined technique with Nozomi (a technique that sends a firebird at the opponent, but the name is unknown).
- Max: He is a strong Hikarian with a bold personality. He is in charge of the same area as E4, so they are often together. His weapons are the Power Hammer and the Earth Shield. He doesn't say much, although not as much as E4. In the sequel, another Hikarian of the same type as him appears, but he himself does not appear, so his whereabouts are shrouded in mystery.
- Hikari: Captain of the JHR, who Hikarian-changed from the 100 series. He is usually a reliable captain, but he is quick-tempered and quite picky. He has a strong sense of responsibility and has been known to take on everything on his own, which has led to him collapsing from overwork. He has also lost his temper against Euro and the Hitachi Brothers. He cannot swim. His weapons are a sonic cracker and a light shield. His special move is a flash ring. He has suffered the most tragic of all the Hikarian, having been shrunk by Blatcher's machine and even silver-plated and put into a state of suspended animation. He also appears as a captain in the OVA, but does not perform as well as he did in the TV series, and only says "It's dangerous!" twice and "That's unfair!" along with Windash, Max, and Policewin.
- Windash: He is an operator of the "Hikarian Station" and an assistant to Dr. 300X. He has limited precognitive abilities. He is earnest, honest, and easygoing, but sometimes clumsy. He also gets flustered by unexpected events. In episode 118, he was invited to the Kyushu branch to study his psychic powers, but Minayo was with him on the way to Hakata, so he was forced to make many detours by her and was scolded by 300X. However, thanks to the detours, he was able to save a child who was about to get into an accident. His weapons are a crescent sword and a shield from the future, but since he is not a combat member, they are not used in the story. He is the most sensible person among the characters. He is so skilled at operating computers that there is a scene where he operates the console keyboard so fast that it leaves an afterimage.

When he appears, he is usually doing desk work, but he has also played hide-and-seek with the younger group of West Tsubasa and Tetsuyuki.

- E2 Jet: Hikarian whose "speed is life". Whenever he finds something faster than him, he will challenge it to a speed contest even while on commercial duty, which has led to him being struck by lightning several times by Professor 300X and eventually being suspended. However, this tendency seems to have since been cured. In his Hikarian form, he can fly faster than the speed of sound. His weapon is a jet gun. His special move is the jet gun attack. A character with the same name also appears in the sequel, "Lightning Super Express Hikarian," but he is a different person.
- Police-Win: He is a member of the Hikarian Special Vehicle Squad and belongs to the Railway Police Force. He Hikarian-changes from the WIN350, which has a police car-like design. His catchphrase is "Arrest!." He has a kind-hearted personality and cannot leave people in trouble alone, which is why criminals often escape. He has a record of consecutively letting criminals escape at least 70 times in the show. He has also been very successful thanks to Seven's special training. Each member of the special vehicle squad has a special trailer, and in the case of Police Win, it is a "police trailer" with a giant arm. According to an article in "Terebi-kun," he is apparently a brother of Windash and Rescue Win, who did not appear in the TV series, but this is not depicted in the show. His weapons are a Patrivolver and a Police Shield.
- Fire N'ex: He is one of the Hikarian special vehicle team and the captain of the railway fire brigade. He is an Edokko who speaks in a frank manner and has a lively personality. He is sometimes portrayed as being fond of Minayo. His special vehicle is a fire trailer. His weapon is a chemical fire extinguishing arm. He also appears as an Edokko in the OVA.
- Sniper Sonic: He is a member of the Hikarian Special Vehicle Corps and the Railway Security Force, and is also the leader of the Special Vehicle Corps. He has a calm and collected personality, and as his name "Sniper" suggests, he is an extremely accurate shooter. He often tries to pick up women from earth, including Sonic Ladies, but usually fails. His special vehicle is a sniper trailer equipped with a large cannon capable of long-range firing. Its coloring is light green. His weapon is a sniper cannon.
- Dr. 300X: He is the commander of the Hikarians, and everyone calls him "Doctor." He has a gentle personality but a strong and determined will. He made all of the equipment for the Hikarians, including the Hikarian Station. He can be soft on his assistant Windash, and in episode 143, he tried to take Windash to the venue in the station because he was feeling down because he couldn't go to the party. This was a trap set by Black, but it failed because there was no parking lot at the venue. His weapon is a magnetic shield, but it is not used in the story. Although not as bad as Captain Hikari, he generally gets angry easily.
- Nankai Lapito: A ninja Hikarian. He likes being alone and is usually cool. He hates natto so much that he faints. He once took Dozilas and Ukkary as his disciples. His weapon is a ninja sword, a large windmill shuriken. In a picture book published by Poplar Publishing, he speaks in a thick Kansai dialect. Some people have even suspected him of being a lolicon after a story in the third season. Although he appears stoic, he actually has a side to him that wants to be noticed (episode 41), and this aspect is also carried over to "Lightning Super Express Hikarian". His techniques include the "Bunshin no Jutsu" (clone technique), which is unique to ninjas, and in his first appearance, he also used the "Flaming Return Technique" (flame return technique), which deflects flame attacks, and the "Substitution Technique" (substitution technique), which allows him to instantly replace various objects. His special moves are the "Ninjaken Kankugiri" (ninja sword that instantly kills opponents), and the "Bunshin Tornado" (clone tornado), which creates a tornado while in a cloned state in episode 74.
- Azusa: A Hikarian nurse who assists Dr. Yellow. The only female Hikarian at the JHR base. She is usually a kind older sister, but she is very strong and scary when angry. She shows her incredible strength in many places, such as causing earthquakes with Max's power hammer and flying at high speed while carrying Minayo's Tetsuyuki Robo. The ribbon-like decoration on her head can also be used as a propeller. She has used this at full power to use a special move called the "Azusa Cyclone". When she fought with Minayo, she abandoned her repair duties for a completely unrelated friend. When Tetsuyuki collapsed from overeating, she tried to examine him, but she had never examined a human before and was confused, saying "there are no joints or screws." In episode 115 of the TV series, she had a crush on Star 21. The Hikarians call her "Azusa-chan" and Minayo calls her "Azusa-san". The electronic display on her body usually displays flowers, and when she is angry it turns into an "!" mark or a "bomb" mark, and when she is in love it turns into a "heart" mark, so her emotions can be read from that. As mentioned above, she seems to have feelings for Star 21.
- Lighting West: A baby who hikarian-changed from the 500 Series. His powers transcend even time and space. His powers transcend time and space are only revealed when he cries loudly, so when West is about to cry, everyone runs away, Hikaruan and Blucher alike. He has grown a little since the third season and is now able to talk. He is a hard worker who ran alone from Osaka to Tokyo in a typhoon, carrying medicine to help the sick Nozomi. His weapon is the Wing Sensor. His special move is "Time Slash" (Episode 127). In the sequel, Lightning Super Express Hikarian, he becomes the main character on the Hikarian side.
- Doctor Yellow: He is the Hikarians' first-class engineer, responsible for everything from maintaining the mecha used by the Hikarians to maintaining the tracks. Everyone calls him "Doctor." He is one of the operators of the Hikarians' Station, and also pilots the Hikarians' Trailer and Big Wonder, so he is more active outside the Hikarians' Station than the other two. On the other hand, he often creates failures. He is not good at fighting, and was once nearly defeated by the Black Express. After riding the giant armored vehicle Big Wonder, which was developed for use in maintaining the tracks, he began to play an active role on the front lines.
- E3 Racer: He is a rival of E2 and a former member of a biker gang. He has a humorous personality. While E2 excels in speed in the air, he has tires on his feet and excels in speed on land. He often competes with E2 for "Kiritanpo". His weapon is Kiritanpo, but the design clearly states that it is a "Kiritanpo-shaped grenade". Like E2 Jet, a character with the same name appears in the sequel, "Denkou Chotokkyu Hikarian", but he is a different person.
- E4 Power: He is Max's childhood friend and best friend. According to Max, he is a "silent guy" and only speaks a few times in the movie. Therefore, he usually communicates things with gestures. Some of his gestures are quite forceful, such as "night" and "three" meaning "no forgiveness." His weapon is a power bat. His special move is the double-decker.
- Yamabiko
- K-kun: He is the youngest of the Hikarians, and his relative Yamabiko asks Tsubasa to look after him. Although he is young, he can speak a little and often calls him "K-kun". In the story, there is a scene where he runs coupled with Tsubasa, just like Yamabiko.
- Kodama: The elder of the Hikarians who changed from the 0 series. He is always asleep. When West, as a child, cried in front of Tetsuyuki and the others, he woke up for the first time in 10 years. However, when he woke up, he used his psychic powers to give a prophecy, but fell asleep again. The way the visor opens is different between the early and later versions. In the early version, the two windows on the front were rotated halfway and his eyes were sticking out from them, but in the later version, it is the same as the toy version and other Hikarians. In the flashback scene of the Yamabiko in episode 71, Kodama (later Kodajii) in his prime appears, and he is braver than it would imagine from his current appearance. He has a secret technique called "Kodajii Style Ageha no Cho" (Kodajii Style Ageha no Cho), but it was completely ineffective against Blatchers (or rather, he was unable to use it because he sprained his back and destroyed himself as soon as he tried to use it).
- STAR21: Experimental engineer
- Seven
- Eurostar Blue Euro: Eurostar only appears in the series twice. After one fight, he is so badly damaged that he has to undergo a treatment that will eventually become the Blue Euro. (The treatment was in the background so only the creators knew how it was).
- Hitachi Brothers: There are four in total.
- Odakyū Romancecar
- Skyliner
- Rescue: American Hikarian Road Fire Engine.
- Hikarian X/Shadow X: Combines with Sphinx and Nazca to form God X.

=== Humans ===
- Tetsuyuki Shinbashi (新橋 テツユキ Shinbashi Tetsuyuki) / Terry : Friends with the Hikarians and a lover of trains.
- Minayo Kanda (神田 ミナヨ Kanda Minayo) / Mina : Terry's girlfriend.
- Kenta Hijibarashi (聖橋 ケンタ Hijibarashi Kenta): A boy who always works with Lightning West. Has a yoyo as a weapon and a Lightning Garuda pilot.

=== Blatcher Gang ===
- Black Express: The boss of the Blatcher Gang. He uses an electric maces and most times hides in black smoke.
- Dozilas: The henchmen of Black Express. They have a mild heart and like to play with children.
- Ukkary: A careless and daydreaming Streamlined locomotive.
- Silver Express Mastermind of the Blatcher Gang.
- Smoke Jo: The gigantic locomotive made by the Blatchers. When it passes by, everything will turn totally black.
- Baron Euro
- Star: Black Express' daughter (probably)

== Chinese CGI knockoff ==
In January 2011, it was announced Pat Lee would be working with Carloon Animation to create a CGI cartoon about trains called Train Hero (高铁侠). In July 2011, Chinese viewers of previews were shocked that it was a shot-for-shot knockoff of Hikarian. After Pat Lee was sued by TV Tokyo & Takara Tomy when they found out about the cartoon being a rip-off of Hikarian, Pat Lee created a revised version called Train Heroes (トレインヒーロー) which began airing in Japan in April 2013.

== See also ==
- Shinkansen Henkei Robo Shinkalion
