= Doi (surname) =

Do-i
- Pronunciation: Doi
- Language: Japanese

Origin
- Region of origin: Japan

Doi (土井、土居、土肥) are three Japanese family names that are pronounced identically, with the first kanji of each pair of characters meaning "earth." Since they are the same phonetically, they are romanized identically: "do" for the first character and "i" for the second. Their identical pronunciation makes them function as the same surname in languages with writing systems that do not use some form of Chinese characters (for example, the Latin alphabet).

== People with the surname ==
- Hiroaki Doi (土井宏昭; born 1978), Japanese hammer thrower
- Ichitarō Doi (土居 市太郎; 1887–1973), Japanese shogi player
- Isami Doi (1903–1965), American artist
- Kathryn Doi Todd (born 1942), American judge and mother of Mia Doi Todd
- Kiyoshi Doi (土井 淳; born 1933), Japanese baseball player
- Koji Doi (土井 公二), Japanese mathematician, who introduced Doi–Naganuma lifting
- Masao Doi (土井 正男; born 1948), Japanese polymer scientist
- Melissa Doi, American businesswoman and September 11 attack victim
- Mia Doi Todd (born 1975), American musician and daughter of Kathryn Doi Todd
- Mika Doi (土井 美加; born 1956), Japanese voice actress
- Misaki Doi (土居 美咲; born 1991), Japanese professional tennis player
- Miwako Doi (土井 美和子), Japanese electrical engineer
- Naruki Doi (土井 成樹; born 1980), Japanese professional wrestler
- Ryosuke Doi (土井 陵輔; born 2002), Japanese artistic gymnast
- Ryuichi Doi (土肥 隆一; 1939–2016), Japanese politician
- Shingo Doi (土井 槙悟; born 1983), Japanese speed skater
- Shoma Doi (土居 聖真; born 1992), Japanese footballer
- Shuta Doi (土居 柊太; born 1996), Japanese footballer
- Takako Doi (土井 たか子; 1928–2014), Japanese female politician
- Takao Doi (土井 隆雄; born 1954), Japanese astronaut
- Takeo Doi (土井 武夫; 1904–1996), Japanese aircraft designer
- Takeo Doi (土居 健郎; 1920–2009), Japanese psychoanalyst
- Takero Doi (土居 丈朗; born 1970), Japanese economist
- Toshikatsu Doi (土井 利勝; 1573–1644), Japanese daimyō
- Toshitada Doi (土井 利忠; born 1943), Compact Disc inventor
- Yoichi Doi (土肥 洋一; born 1973), Japanese footballer
- Yoshihiro Doi (土肥 義弘; born 1976), Japanese baseball player
- Yukihiro Doi (土井 雪広; born 1983), Japanese racing cyclist
- Yuriko Doi, choreographer and stage director
- Remi Anri Doi, Japanese handball player
