= Shūta =

- Gender: Male

Origin
- Origin: Japanese
- Meaning: Different meanings depending on the kanji used

Shūta, Shuta or Shuuta (written: 秀太, 周大, 柊太, 洲太 or 修汰) is a masculine Japanese given name. Notable people with the name include:

- Shuta Doi (土居 柊太; born 1996), Japanese footballer
- Shuta Sonoda (其田 秀太; born 1969), Japanese footballer
- Shuta Sueyoshi (末吉 秀太; born 1986), Japanese singer, actor and dancer
- Shuta Tanaka (田中 秀太; born 1977), Japanese former professional baseball player
- Shuta Tonosaki (外崎 修汰; born 1992), Japanese professional baseball player
- Shuta Yoshino (吉野 洲太; born 1943), Japanese boxer
