= STAR21 =

Experimental Japanese shinkansen trainset

Class 952/953 "STAR21"
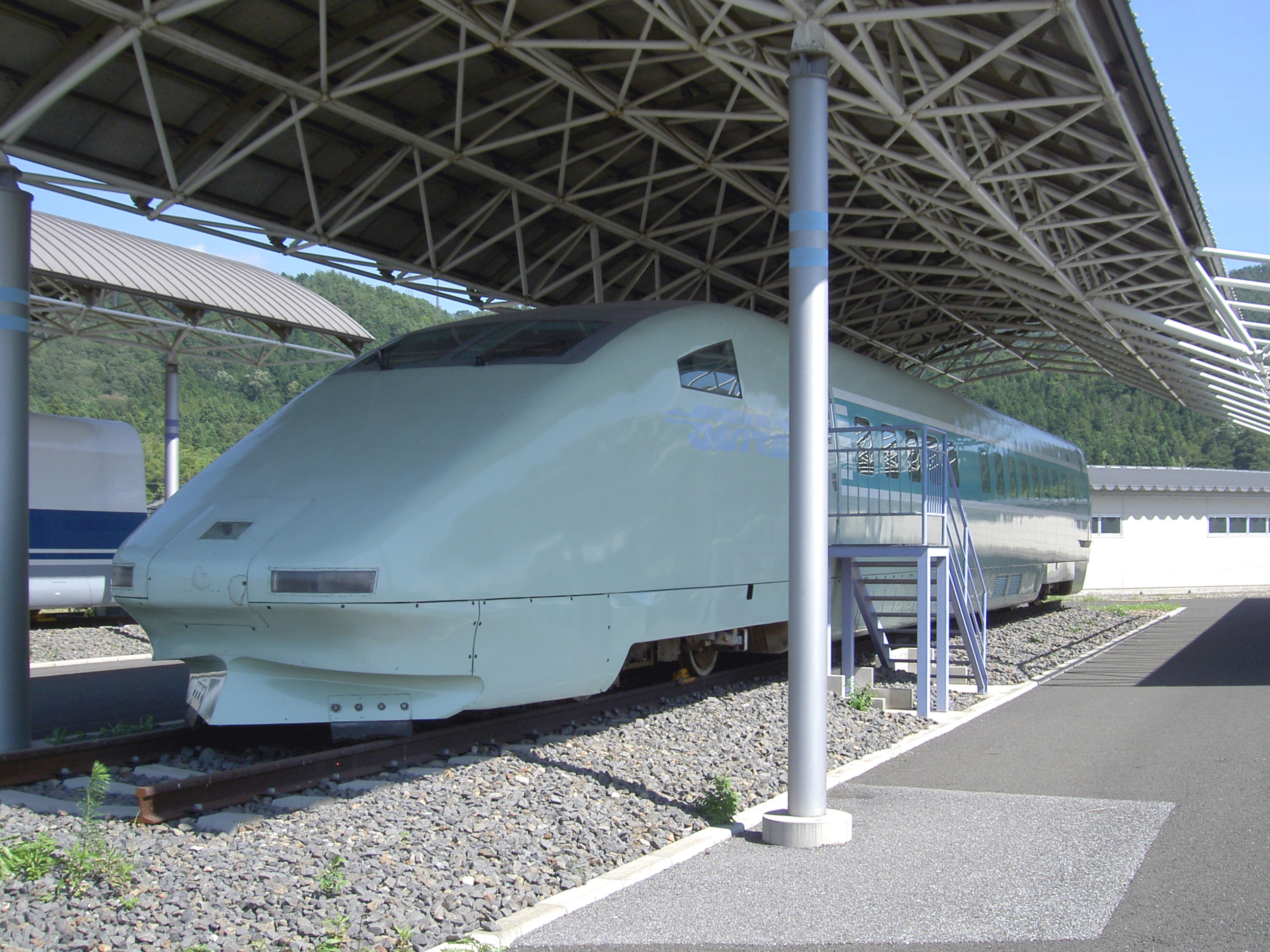
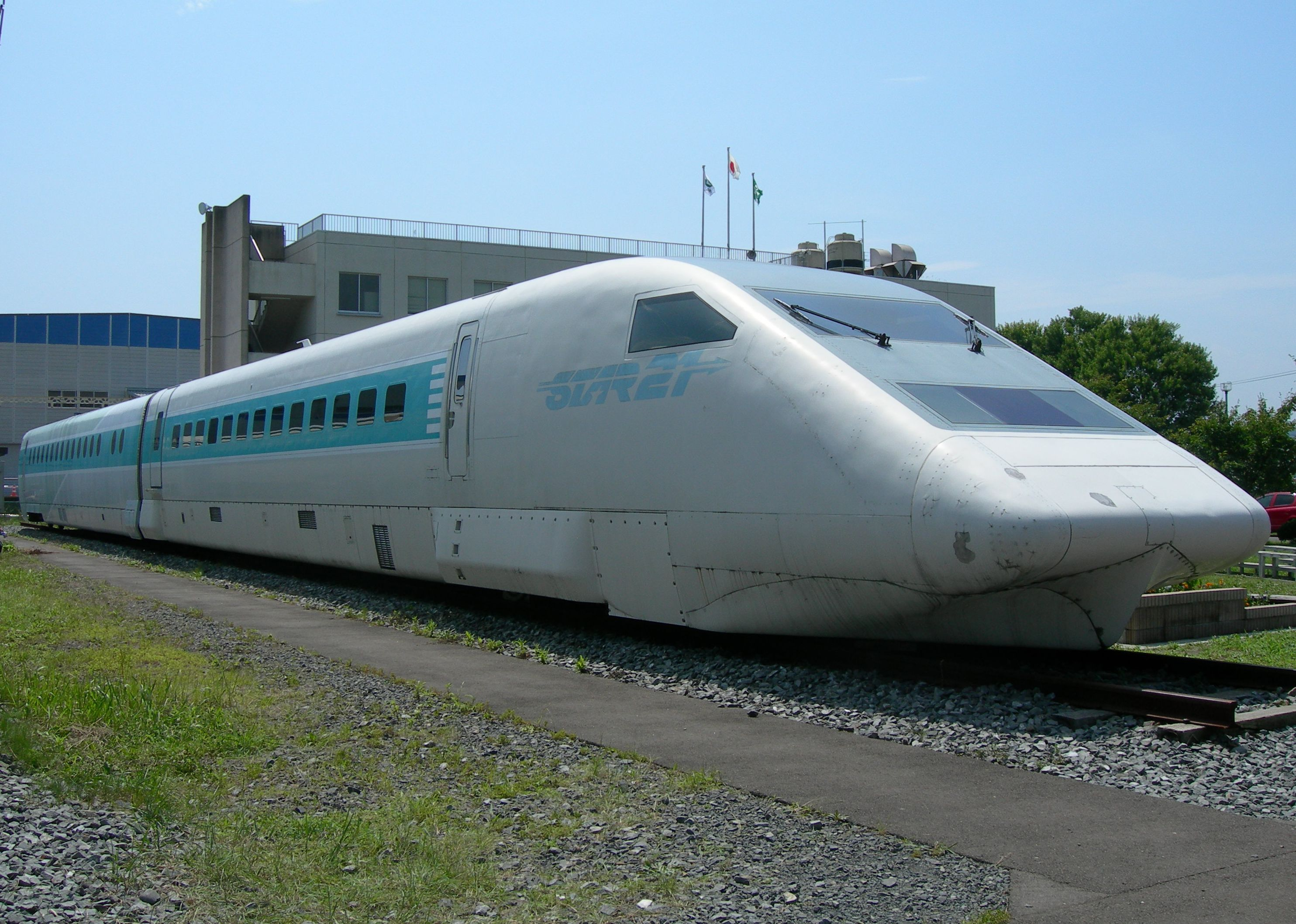
- Class 952 Class 953
- In service: 1992–1998
- Manufacturers: Hitachi, Kawasaki Heavy Industries, Nippon Sharyo
- Constructed: 1992
- Scrapped: 1998
- Number built: 9 vehicles
- Number in service: None
- Number preserved: 3 vehicles
- Number scrapped: 6 vehicles
- Formation: 9 cars
- Fleet numbers: S5
- Operator: JR East
- Lines served: Tohoku Shinkansen, Joetsu Shinkansen

Specifications
- Car body construction: Aluminium alloy
- Width: 3,100 mm (10 ft 2 in)
- Maximum speed: 350 km/h (217 mph) (nominal)
- Traction system: Variable frequency (GTO)
- Electric system: 25 kV AC, 50 Hz Overhead catenary
- Current collection: Pantograph
- Track gauge: 1,435 mm (4 ft 8 1/2 in) standard gauge

"STAR21" was the name given to the Class 952/953 (952・953形) 9-car experimental Shinkansen train developed in 1992 by the East Japan Railway Company (JR East) in Japan to test technology to be incorporated in next-generation shinkansen trains operating at speeds of 350 km/h (217 mph) or higher. The name was an acronym for "Superior Train for the Advanced Railway toward the 21st Century".

== Design ==
The train consisted of nine cars arranged in two distinct "halves", with the Class 952 half-set consisting of four separate vehicles, and the Class 953 half-set consisting of five articulated vehicles using shared bogies.

Three different construction methods were used for the vehicle bodies. Cars 1 to 3 used welded hollow aluminium extrusions, cars 4 to 5 used brazed aluminium honeycomb panels, and cars 6 to 9 used an aircraft-style Duralumin fuselage construction.

The front-end design of the two driving vehicles (952-1 and 953–5) were slightly different, although both used a wedge-shaped profile with little lateral taper.

The external livery was light green for the Class 952 cars (including half of car 953–1), "snow" grey for cars 953–1 to 953–3, and beige for cars 953–3 to 953–5, with a light blue window band throughout the length of the train.

Internally, cars were fitted with passengers seats, arranged 2+2 abreast for standard class cars, and 2+1 abreast for the Green car (952-4). Five different types of lightweight seating design were tested.

== Formation ==
The set, designated S5, was initially formed as follows with some cars unpowered.

Car No.	1	2	3	4	5	6	7	8	9
Designation	Tc	M	M'	Ts	T	M	M'	M	M'c
Numbering	952-1	952-2	952-3	952-4	953-1	953-2	953-3	953-4	953-5
Seating capacity	56	63	72	34	56	48			46
Weight (t)	30.0	29.9	33.2	25.5	19.4	20.7	21.4	20.4	27.0
Vehicle length (mm)	26,250	25,000			22,250	18,500			25,500

Cars 1 to 3 were built by Nippon Sharyo, cars 4 to 5 were built by Hitachi, and cars 6 to 8 were built by Kawasaki Heavy Industries.

Cars 3 and 7 were fitted with pantographs.

== History ==
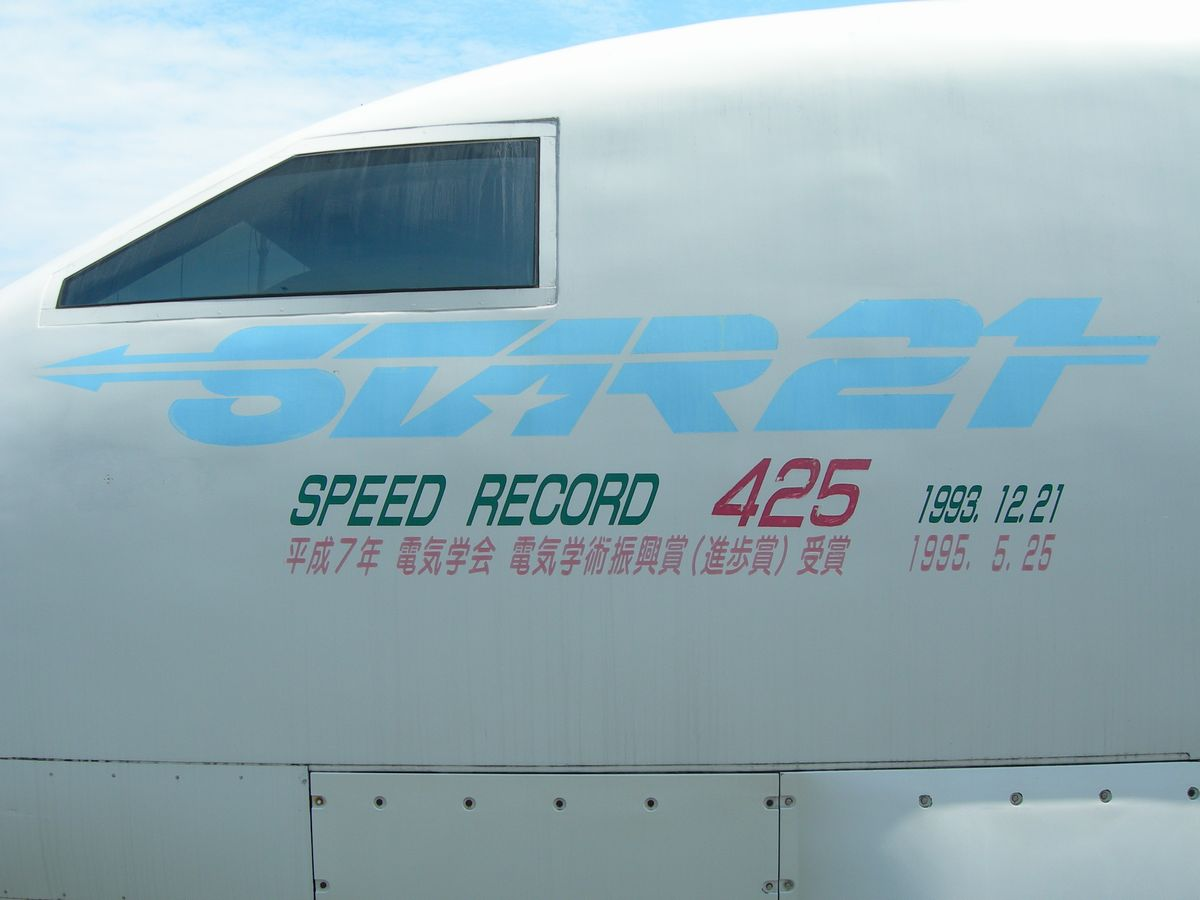
Sticker on the side of 953-5 commemorating the national railway speed record of 425.0 km/h(lower:Receive the Heisei7(1995) IEEJ Electrical Science Promotion Award(Progress Award).)

The train was delivered in March 1992, and unveiled to the press on 2 April.

On 30 October 1992, the train recorded a Japanese national speed record of 353.0 km/h (219.3 mph) on the Jōetsu Shinkansen between Urasa and Niigata, surpassing the record previously set by JR West's "WIN350" experimental train in August of the same year. On 1 November 1992, the record was raised to 358.0 km/h (222.5 mph) between Tsubame-Sanjō and Niigata.

In 1993, the train was modified with the addition of motors to all axles, increasing its overall rating to 4,620 kW (6,200 hp).

On 13 December 1993, the train reached 400 km/h (248.5 mph), and on 21 December recorded a Japanese national speed record of 425.0 km/h (264.1 mph) on the Jōetsu Shinkansen between Tsubame-Sanjō and Niigata. This record stood until it was broken by JR Central's "300X" experimental train in July 1996.

The STAR21 trainset was officially withdrawn on 17 February 1998.

== Preservation ==
End car 952-1 is preserved outdoors at the RTRI large-scale wind tunnel test facility in Maibara, Shiga, first displayed to the public on 10 October 1998. Cars 953-1 and 953-5 are preserved at Sendai Shinkansen Depot. A DT9035B bogie from the train was donated in June 1998 by Sumitomo Metal Industries to the Nara National College of Technology in Nara, where it is kept on display.

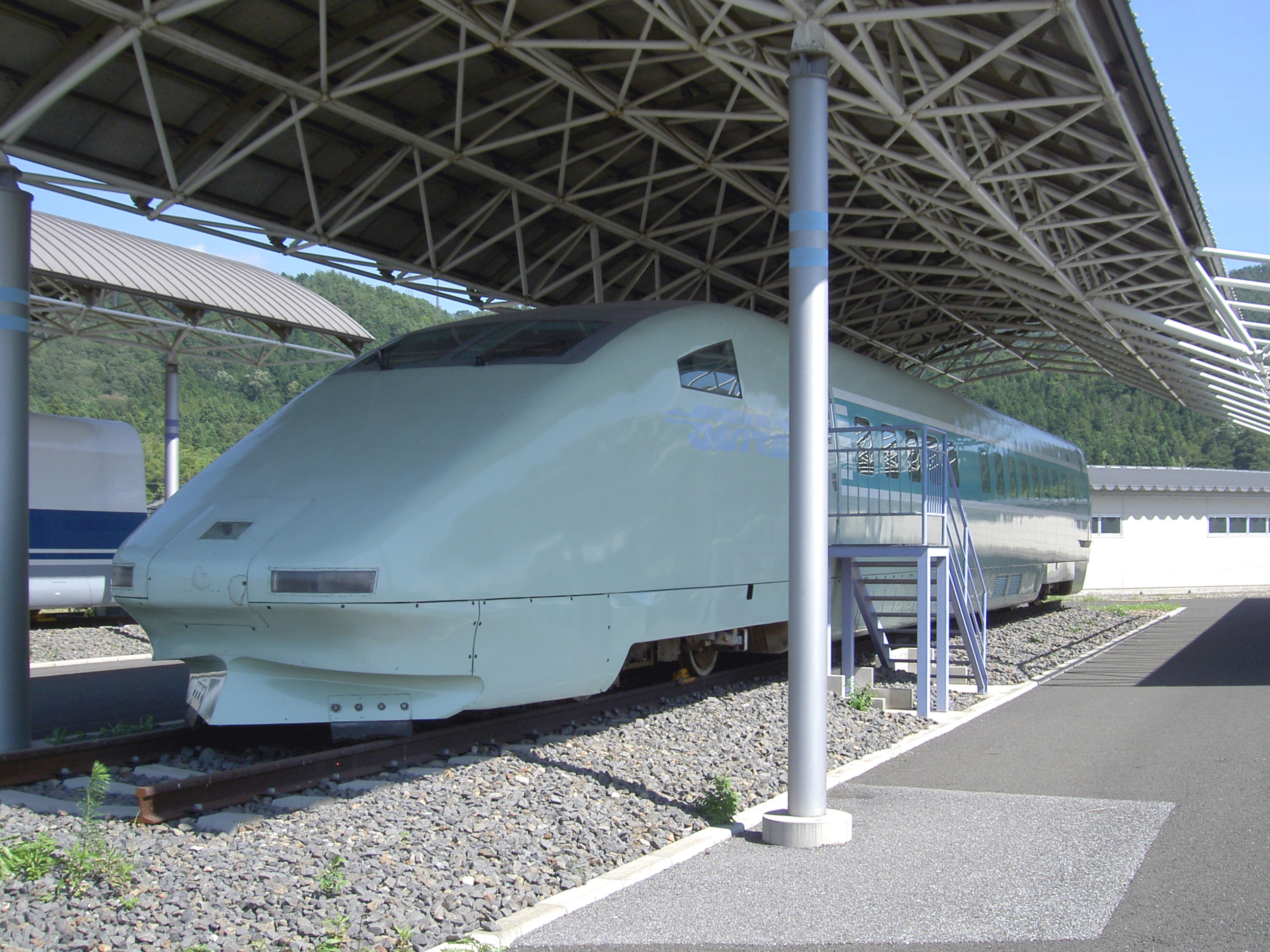
Car 952-1 preserved at Maibara, July 2006

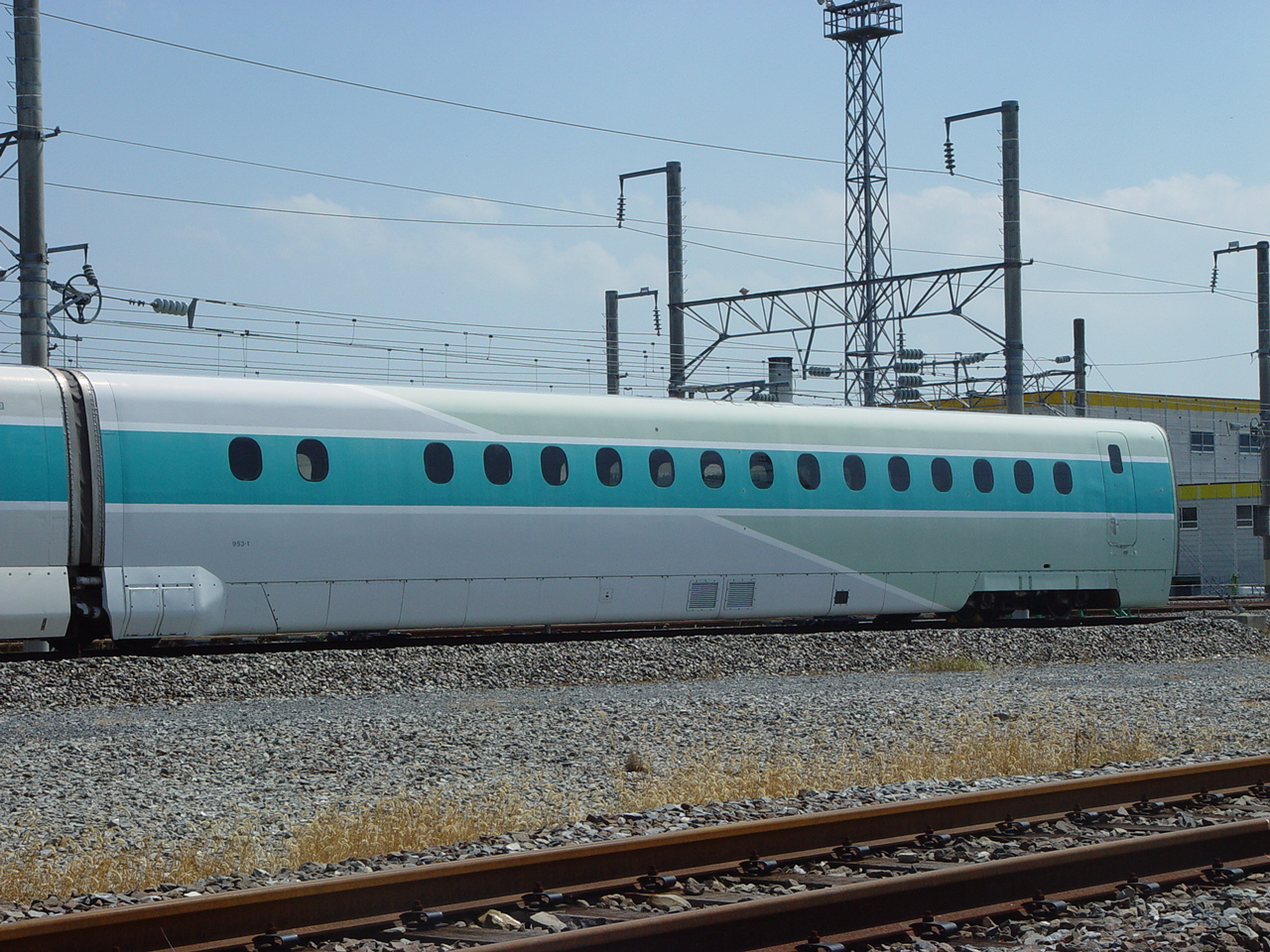
Car 953-1 preserved at Sendai Shinkansen Depot, August 2002

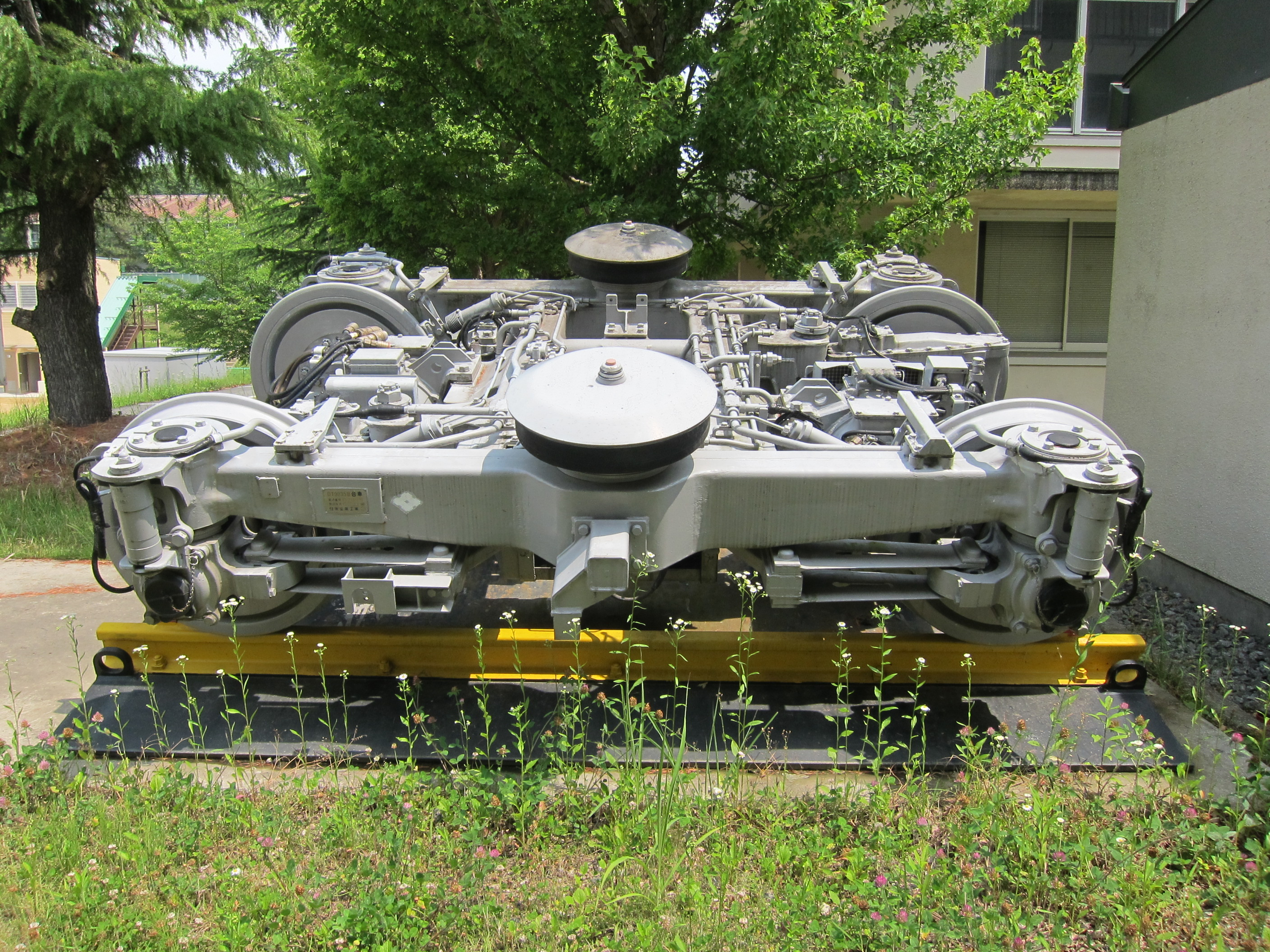
Sumitomo DT9035B bogie preserved at Nara National College of Technology, June 2012
