= Takerō =

- Gender: Male

Origin
- Origin: Japanese
- Meaning: Different meanings depending on the kanji used

Takerō, Takero or Takerou (written: 丈朗 or 豪郎) is a masculine Japanese given name. Notable people with the name include:

- Takero Doi (土居 丈朗; born 1970), Japanese economist
- Takero Okajima (岡島 豪郎; born 1989), Japanese baseball player
