= Miwako Doi =

Japanese electrical engineer

Miwako Doi (Japanese: 土井 美和子) is a Japanese electrical engineer known for her work on user interfaces, robotics, and document processing. She is executive director of the Nara Institute of Science and Technology, executive vice president for data at Tohoku University, auditor of the National Institute of Information and Communications Technology, outside director of the Nomura Research Institute, professor in residence at Osaka University, visiting professor at the Tokyo University of Agriculture and Technology, and a member of the Japan Transport Safety Board.

== Education and career ==
Doi was a student at the University of Tokyo, where she earned a bachelor's degree in 1977, a master's degree in 1979, and a Ph.D. in 2002.

She began working for Toshiba in 1979, and was chief researcher there from 1999 to 2005, senior fellow from 2005 to 2008, and chief fellow from 2008 to 2014. She has been executive director at the Nara Institute of Science and Technology since 2016.

As well as her present positions, she has served as vice president of the Information Processing Society of Japan and of the Institute of Electrical Engineers of Japan, and as president of the Institute of Image Information and Television Engineers.

== Contributions ==
At Toshiba, Doi led the company in recognizing the importance of usability of office equipment by people without technical training, in developing human interfaces for Toshiba's products that would make them usable, and in disseminating their work to similar products from other companies. In particular, her work there involved the creation of document processing and presentation systems that automatically recognized the structure of documents and adjusted the structure as documents were edited, and of software for assisting in the translation of documents by displaying side-by-side views of a document and its translation as both are updated.

== Recognition ==
Doi was elected as an IEEE Fellow in 2011 "for contributions to the human interface of document processing". In 2018 she was named an honorary fellow of the Institute of Electronics, Information and Communication Engineers.
