= Doy =

Doy is a name. Notable people with the name include:

- César Doy (born 1982), Peruvian football defender
- Doy Reed (1895–1981), Australian rules footballer
- Carl Doy, British-born New Zealand pianist, composer, and arranger
- Clodualdo del Mundo Jr., Filipino screenwriter, director, and author nicknamed "Doy".
- Salvador Laurel (1928–2004), Filipino lawyer and politician, also known as Doy Laurel.
- Thritthi Nonsrichai, Thai professional footballer known as "Doy"

== See also ==
- Ibrahim Youssef Al-Doy (born 1945), Bahraini football referee
- Cheung Chi Doy (born 1941), Chinese former professional footballer
