= DOI =

DOI or Doi most commonly refers to:

- Digital object identifier, an international standard for document identification
- United States Department of the Interior, an executive department of the U.S. government

It may also refer to:

== Science and technology ==
- Distinctness of image, a quantification of vision used in optics
- 2,5-Dimethoxy-4-iodoamphetamine, a hallucinogenic drug

== Organizations ==
- Department of Information (Australia), Australian government department, 1939–1950
- Division of Investigation, a precursor to the U.S. Federal Bureau of Investigation
- New York City Department of Investigation, law enforcement agency

== Other uses ==
- Dancing on Ice, a British television series
- Doi (surname), a Japanese surname
- Doi (retailer), a Japanese company
- Doi (clan), a clan of the Gurjar ethnic group
- Dogri language (ISO 639 code), spoken in India and Pakistan
- Declaration of independence, a document to be independent from another country
