= 300X =

Japanese experimental high speed train type

Class 955 "300X"
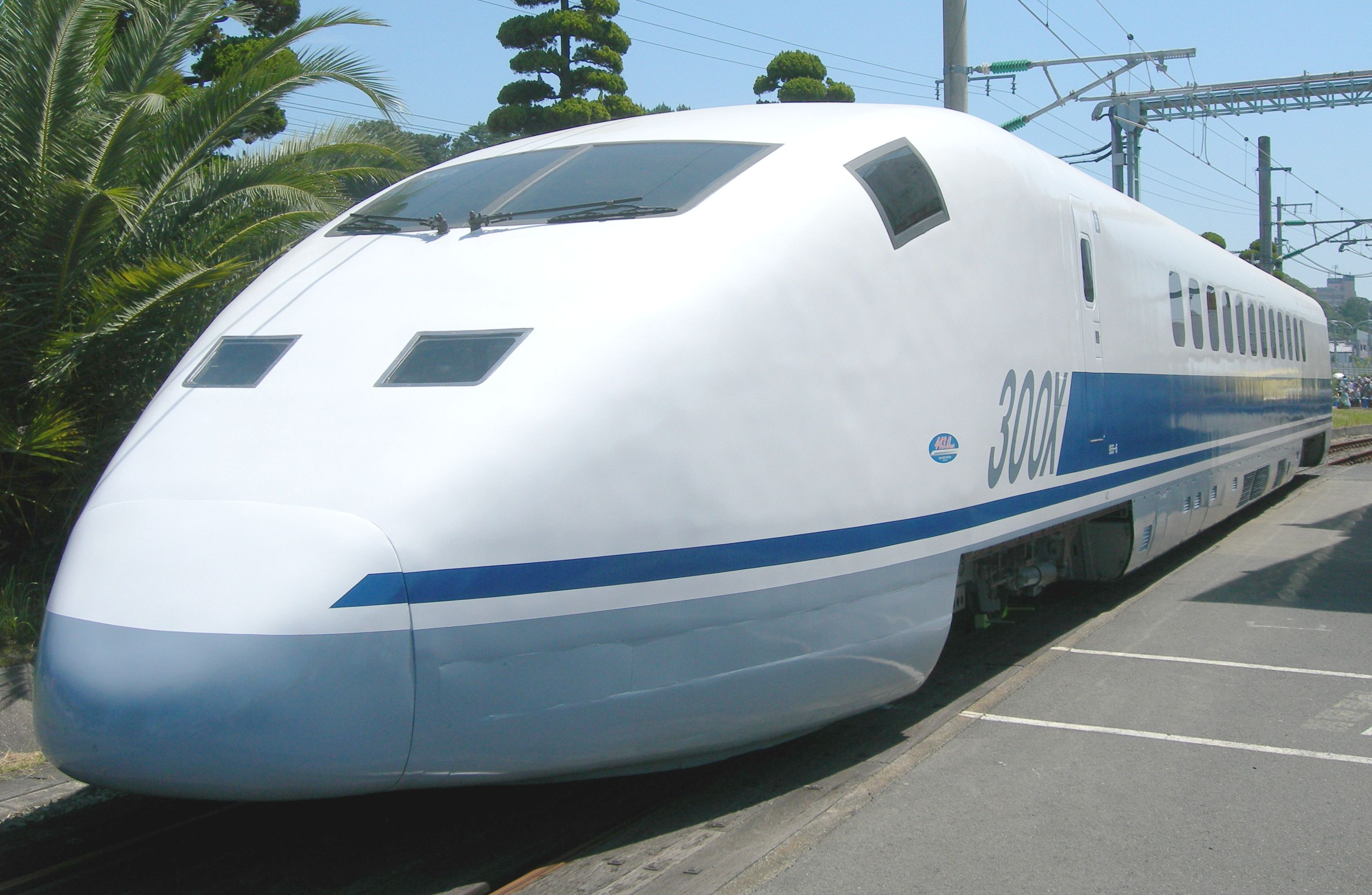
- Preserved car 955-6 at Hamamatsu Works, July 2010
- In service: 1994–2002
- Manufacturers: Hitachi, Kawasaki Heavy Industries, Mitsubishi Heavy Industries, Nippon Sharyo
- Constructed: 1994
- Scrapped: 2002
- Number built: 6 vehicles
- Number in service: None
- Number preserved: 2 vehicles
- Number scrapped: 4 vehicles
- Formation: 6 cars
- Fleet numbers: A0
- Operator: JR Central
- Depot: Tokyo
- Line served: Tōkaidō Shinkansen

Specifications
- Car body construction: Aluminium alloy
- Car length: 27,150 mm (89 ft 1 in) (end cars); 25,000 mm (82 ft 0 in) (intermediate cars)
- Width: 3,100 mm (10 ft 2 in)
- Height: 3,300 mm (10 ft 10 in)
- Maximum speed: 350 km/h (220 mph) (nominal)
- Traction system: 500 kW (670 hp) motors (4 per car)
- Power output: 12 MW (16,000 hp)
- Electric system: 25 kV AC, 60 Hz Overhead catenary
- Current collection: Pantograph
- Track gauge: 1,435 mm (4 ft 8 1/2 in) standard gauge

"300X" was the name given to the Class 955 (955形) 6-car experimental Shinkansen train developed in 1994 by the Central Japan Railway Company (JR Central) in Japan to test technology to be incorporated in future shinkansen trains operating at speeds of 300 km/h (186 mph) or higher.

== Design ==
Manufacture of the train was shared among four different manufacturers, with a number of different body construction methods used. The two ends cars employed differing nose designs, and a number of pantograph shroud designs were tested over the lifetime of the trainset.

== Formation ==
Car No.	1	2	3	4	5	6
Designation	Mc	M	M	M	M	Mc
Numbering	955-1	955-2	955-3	955-4	955-5	955-6
Weight (t)	36	36	36	32	36	36

Cars 2 and 5 were fitted with pantographs.

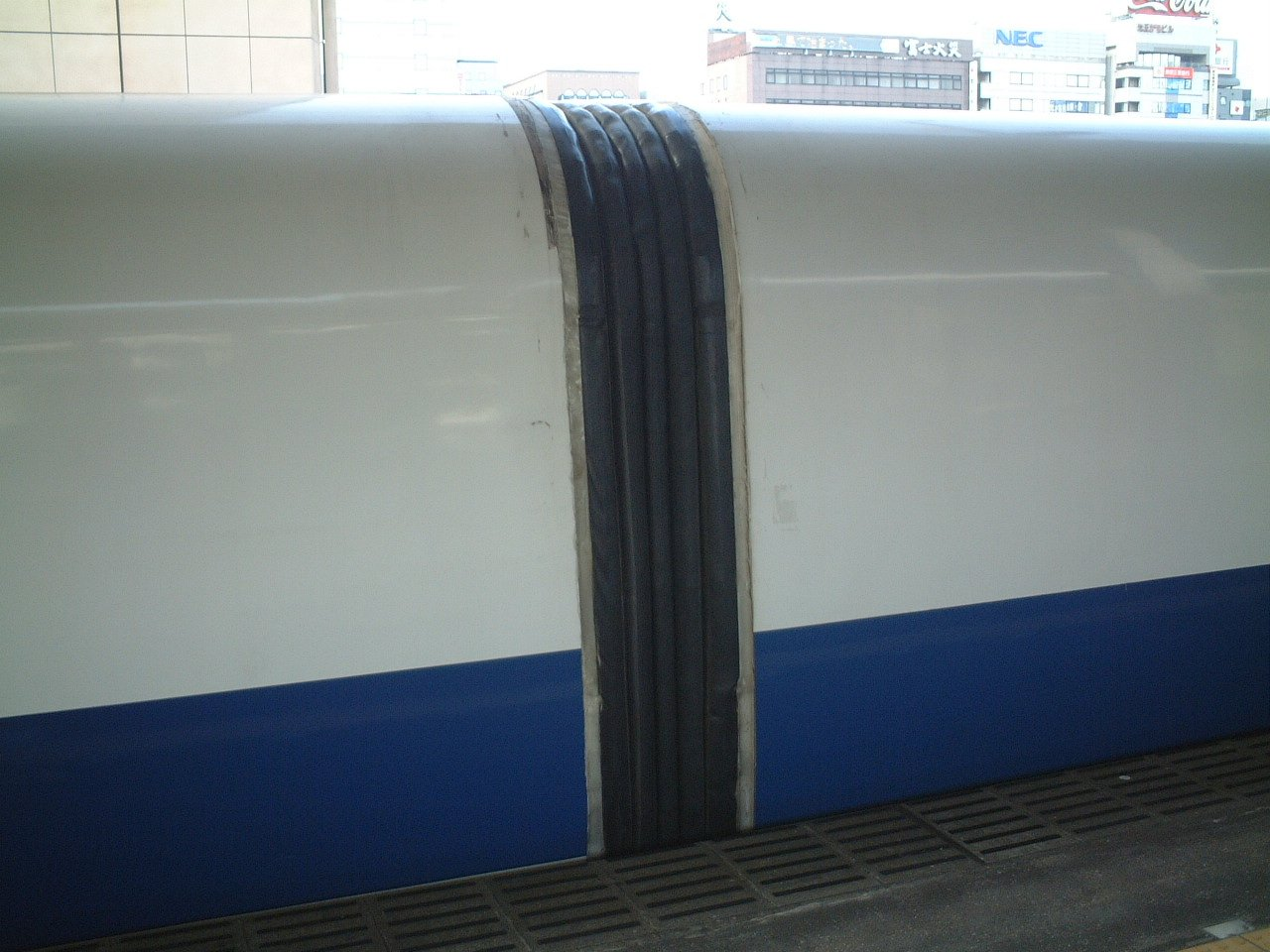
Closeup view of rubber diaphragm between cars, September 2000

=== 955-1 ===
End car with "cusp" nose design, built by Mitsubishi Heavy Industries. The body was constructed of rivetted Duralumin. This car had no passenger seats.

=== 955-2 ===
The body was constructed by Nippon Sharyo using large hollow aluminium extrusions. This was the only car in the trainset to be fitted with passenger seats.

=== 955-3 ===
This vehicle was constructed by Kawasaki Heavy Industries using spot-welded large aluminium extrusions and was fitted with active tilting.

=== 955-4 ===
This vehicle was constructed by Nippon Sharyo using large hollow aluminium extrusions, similar to car 2, and was equipped with large side doors for installing and removing test equipment.

=== 955-5 ===
This vehicle was constructed by Hitachi using aluminium honeycomb panels. This car had no seats.

=== 955-6 ===
Hitachi-built end car with "wedge" nose design. The body was constructed of brazed aluminium honeycomb panels.

== History ==
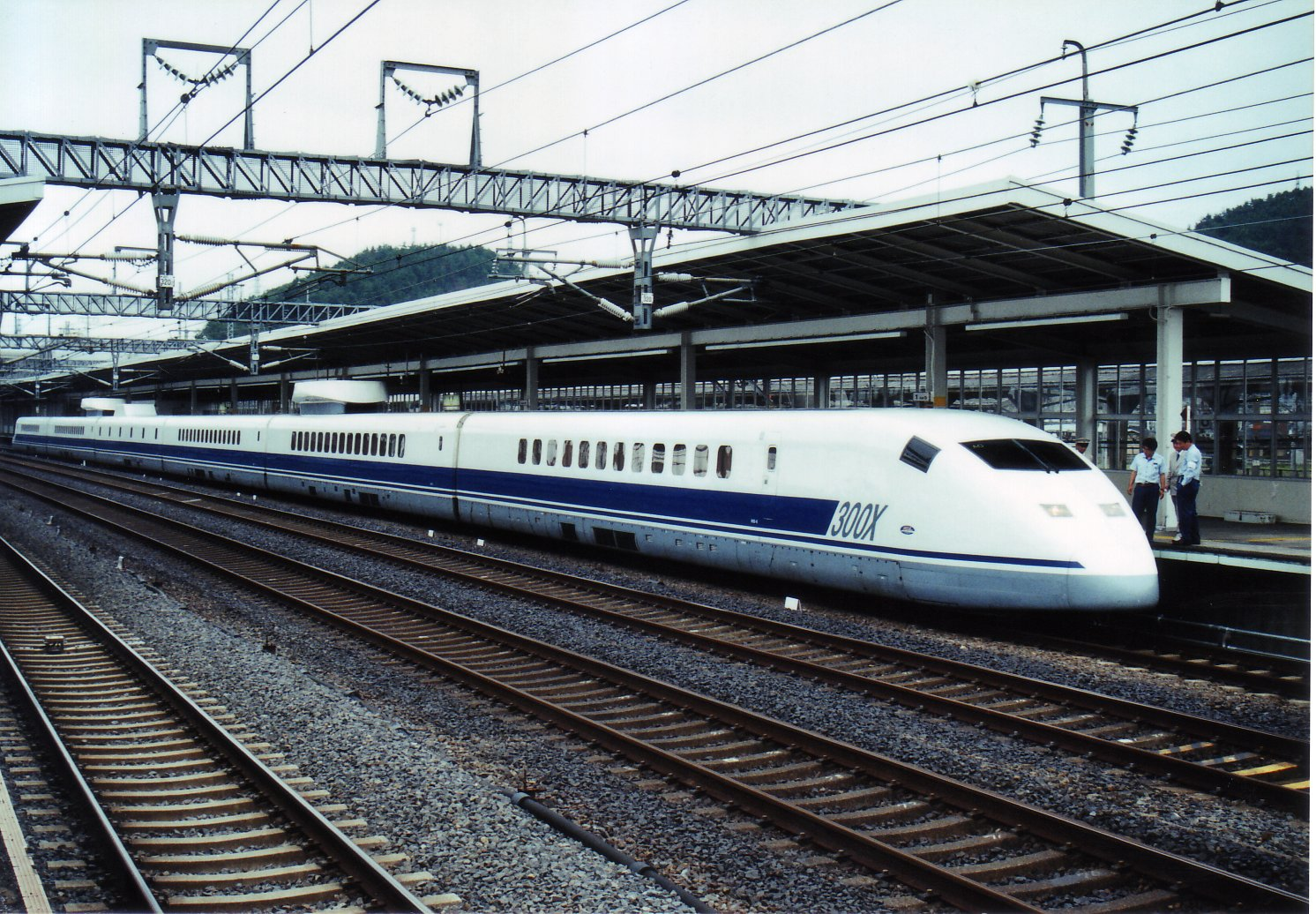
"300X" trainset on a daytime test run at Maibara Station, July 1999

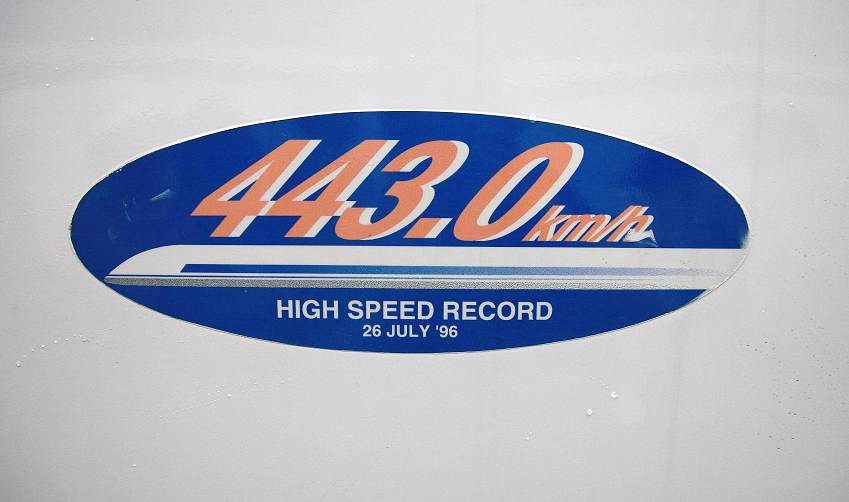
443.0 km/h speed record sticker on car 955-6

The train was unveiled on 22 December 1994.

Test-running on the Tōkaidō Shinkansen was delayed by track damage caused by the Great Hanshin earthquake in January 1995, but full-scale test-running commenced on 25 May 1995, between Maibara and Kyoto.

On 21 September 1995, the Class 955 train recorded a maximum speed of 354.1 km/h (220.0 mph) on the Tokaido Shinkansen between Maibara and Kyoto.

On 11 July 1996, the train recorded a maximum speed of 426.6 km/h (265.1 mph), exceeding the previous national speed record of 425.0 km/h (264.1 mph) set in December 1993 by JR East's Class 952/953 "STAR21" experimental train.

On 26 July 1996, the train recorded a Japanese national speed record of 443.0 km/h (275.3 mph) on the Tokaido Shinkansen between Maibara and Kyoto. This record still stands.

The Class 955 trainset was officially withdrawn on 1 February 2002.

== Preservation ==
End car 955-1 is preserved outdoors at the RTRI large-scale wind tunnel test facility in Maibara, Shiga. End car 955-6 was initially preserved inside JR Central's Hamamatsu Works, and was moved to the new SCMaglev and Railway Park in 2010.

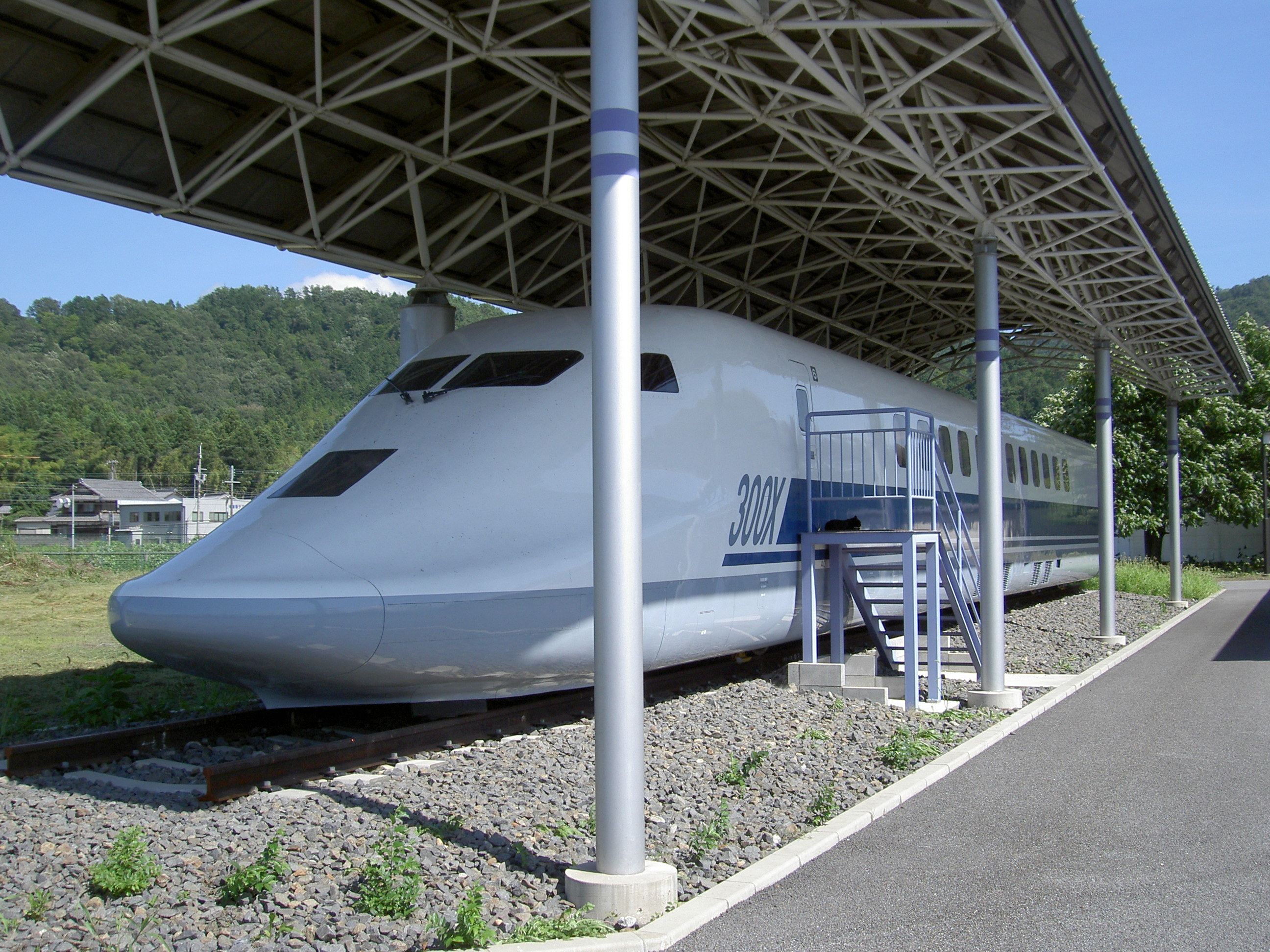
Car 955-1 preserved at Maibara, July 2006

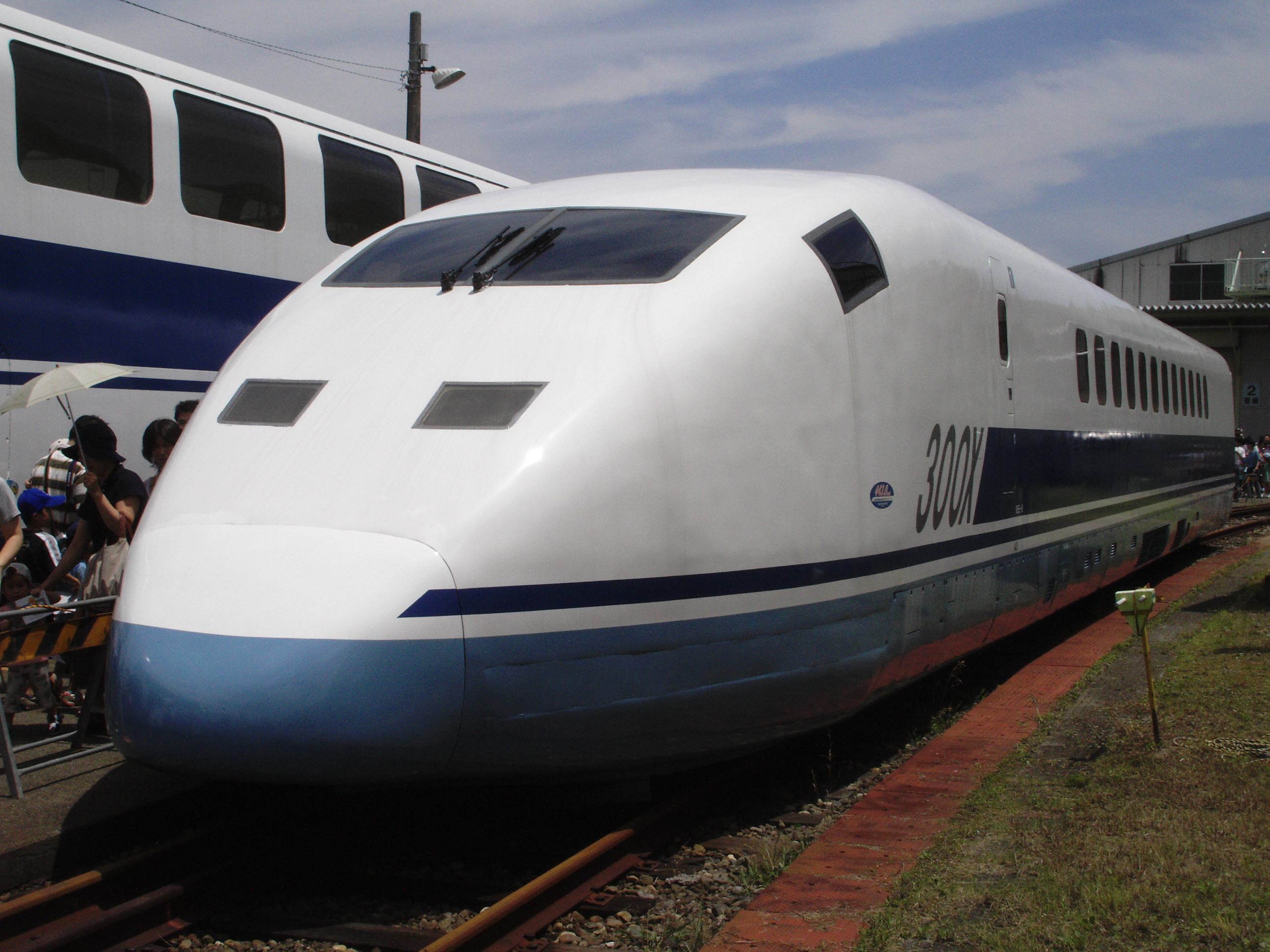
Car 955-6 preserved at Hamamatsu Works, July 2006

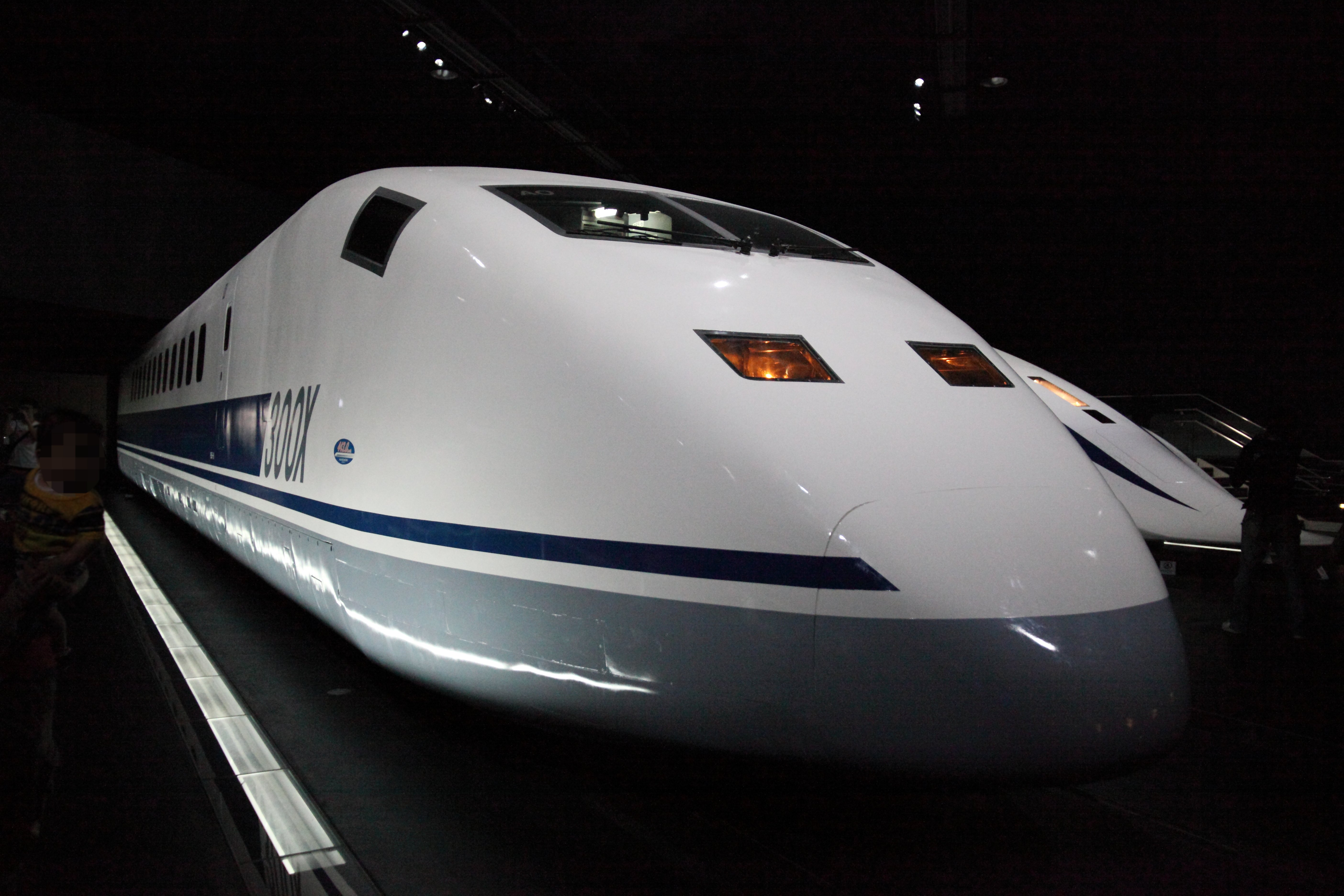
Car 955-6 preserved at the SCMaglev and Railway Park in Nagoya, June 2011
