= Department of Youth =

Department of Youth may refer to:

- "Department of Youth" (song), a song by Alice Cooper
- Department of Youth (New Brunswick), part of the Government of New Brunswick
