= César Doy =

Peruvian footballer (born 1982)

Personal information
- Full name: César Alexander Doy Tello
- Date of birth: 7 April 1982 (age 44)
- Place of birth: Lima, Peru
- Height: 1.72 m (5 ft 8 in)
- Position: Defender

Team information
- Current team: José Gálvez
- Number: 24

Senior career*
Years	Team	Apps	(Gls)
2000–2002	Deportivo Wanka		
2003–2004	Coronel Bolognesi		
2005	Melgar		
2006	Sport Boys		
2006	Unión Huaral		
2007–2008	Alianza Atlético	56	(0)
2009–2011	Sport Huancayo	76	(1)
2012	Melgar	22	(0)
2013–	José Gálvez	8	(0)
- * Club domestic league appearances and goals as of 8 November 2013

César Alexander Doy Tello (born 7 April 1982) is a Peruvian footballer who plays as a defender for José Gálvez FBC.

== Club career ==
César Doy made his debut in the Torneo Descentralizado in the 2000 season playing for Deportivo Wanka, under manager Roberto Mosquera.

Then in January 2003 he joined Coronel Bolognesi. Then the following season with Bolognesi he made his debut in the Copa Sudamericana.

In January 2005 Doy had his first spell with FBC Melgar.
