= Institute of Electrical Engineers of Japan =

Scientific organization

The Institute of Electrical Engineers of Japan (IEEJ) (Japanese: 電気学会) is a scientific and professional organization based in Tokyo, Japan. The organization was founded in 1888. It has more than 23,000 members, including scientists, engineers and students. The institute specialises in the areas of materials, power and energy, electronics, information and systems, sensors and micromachines and other.

== See also ==
- Institute of Electrical and Electronics Engineers in the United States
