= WIN350 =

Japanese experimental high-speed train type

500-900 series "WIN350"
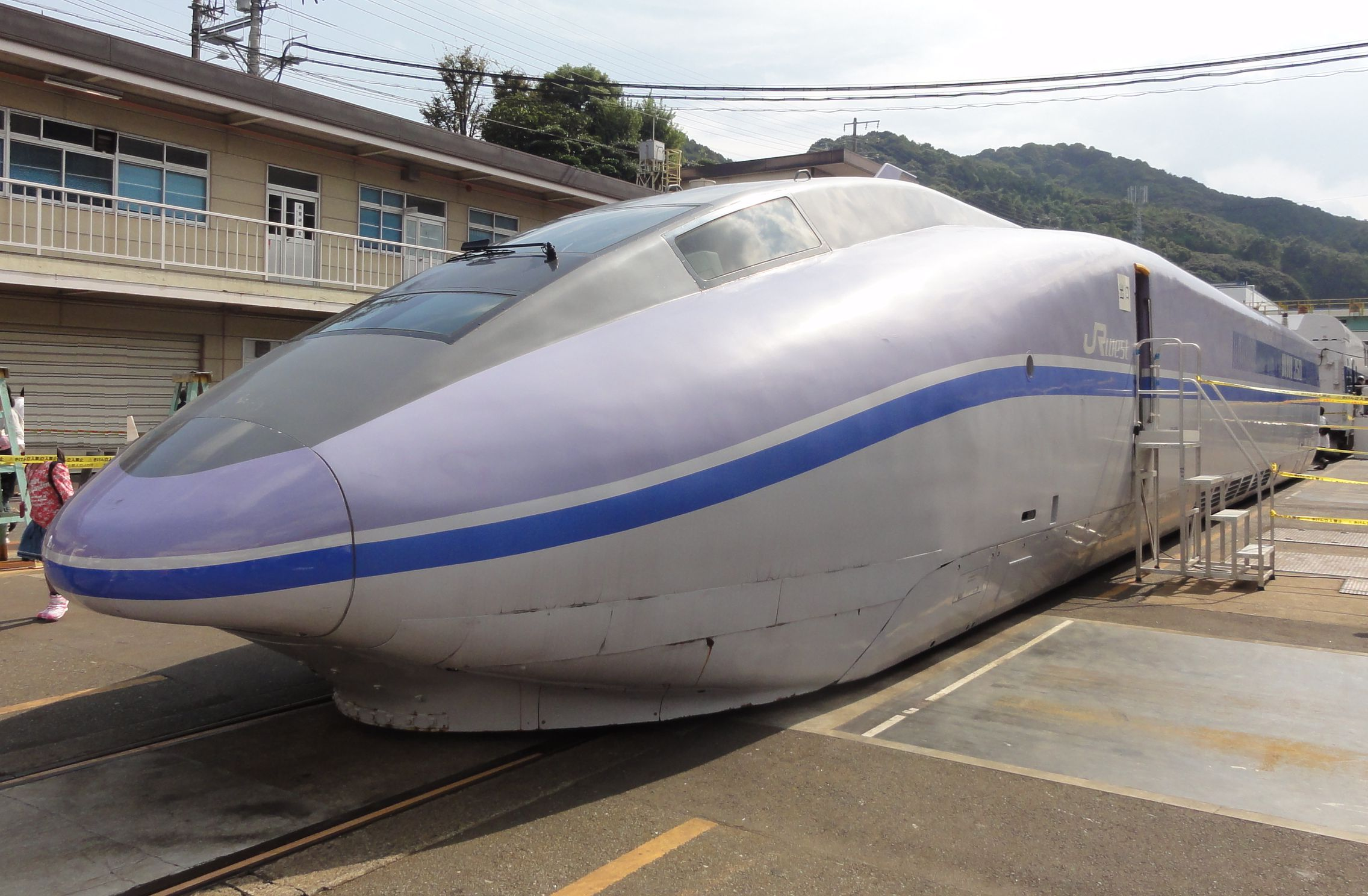
- End car 500-906 preserved at Hakata Shinkansen Depot, October 2011
- In service: 1992–1995
- Manufacturers: Hitachi, Kawasaki Heavy Industries
- Constructed: 1992
- Scrapped: 1996
- Number built: 6 vehicles
- Number in service: None
- Number preserved: 1 vehicle
- Number scrapped: 5 vehicles
- Formation: 6 cars
- Fleet numbers: W0
- Operator: JR West
- Depot: Hakata
- Line served: Sanyo Shinkansen

Specifications
- Car body construction: Aluminium alloy, Honeycomb structure
- Car length: 26.55 m (87 ft 1 in) (end cars); 25 m (82 ft 0 in) (intermediate cars)
- Width: 3,380 mm (11 ft 1 in)
- Maximum speed: 350 km/h (217 mph)(nominal)
- Traction system: 300 kW (402 hp) 3-phase motors
- Power output: 7,200 kW (9,655 hp)
- Electric system: 25 kV AC 60 Hz
- Current collection: Pantograph
- Safety system: ATC
- Track gauge: 1,435 mm (4 ft 8 1/2 in) standard gauge

"WIN350" was the name given to the 500-900 series (500系900番台) 6-car experimental high-speed Shinkansen train developed in 1992 by the West Japan Railway Company (JR West) in Japan to test technology to be incorporated in next-generation shinkansen trains expected to operate at speeds of 350 km/h (217 mph) from 1994. Initially given the designation "500X", the name "WIN350" stood for "West Japan's Innovation for operation at 350 km/h".

== Design ==
Cars 500-901 to 500-903 were built by Kawasaki Heavy Industries in Hyogo Prefecture. Cars 500-904 to 500-906 were built by Hitachi in Yamaguchi Prefecture.

The front-end designs of the two driving vehicles (500-901 and 500-906) were slightly different, with 500-906 featuring a "cockpit" style arrangement. The external livery was purple and light grey, with darker purple lining.

All axles were motored, using 300 kW three-phase motors, and cars were equipped with tilting and active suspension.

Internally, only car 4 was fitted with passenger seats, with 10 rows of 3+2 standard-class seating and 5 rows of 2+2 Green class (first class) seating.

== Formation ==
The 6-car set, designated "W0", was formed as follows.

Car No.	1	2	3	4	5	6
Designation	M'1c	M'1p	M1	M2	M'2p	M2c
Numbering	500-901	500-902	500-903	500-904	500-905	500-906

Initially, cars 1, 2, and 5 were fitted with pantographs.

== History ==
The WIN350 train was delivered to Hakata Shinkansen Depot in April 1992.

On 6 August 1992, the train recorded a Japanese national speed record of 345.8 km/h (214.9 mph) on the San'yō Shinkansen. Two days later, on 8 August 1992, the train recorded a Japanese national speed record of 350.4 km/h (217.7 mph) on the San'yō Shinkansen between Ogōri (now Shin-Yamaguchi) and Shin-Shimonoseki.

The WIN350 trainset was withdrawn on 31 May 1996, and a special farewell ceremony was held at Hakata Shinkansen Depot.

== Preservation ==
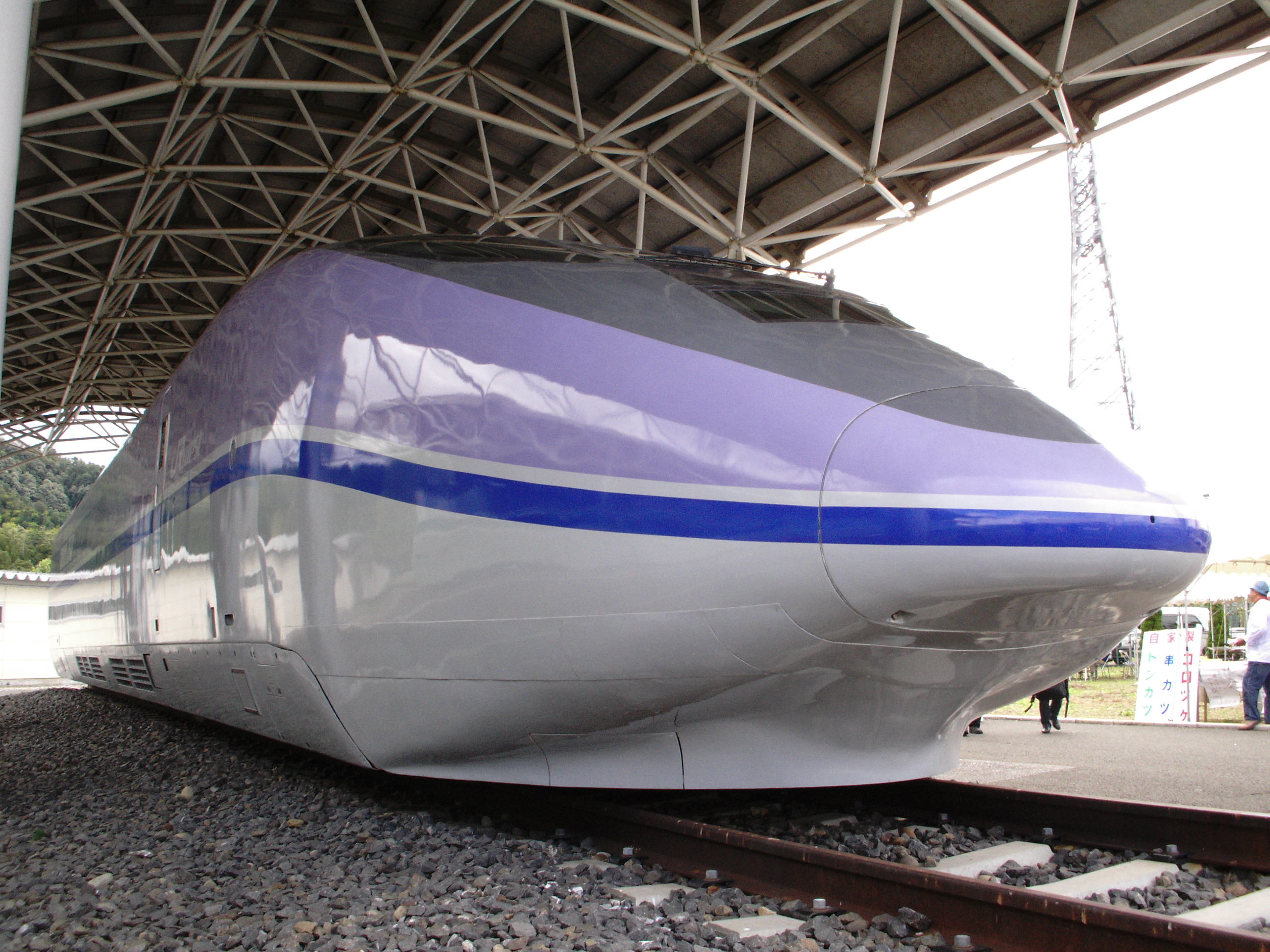
Car 500-901 preserved at Maibara, October 2006

End car 500-901 is preserved outdoors at the RTRI large-scale wind tunnel test facility in Maibara, Shiga. Initially expected to be moved to the Modern Transportation Museum in Osaka, end car 500-906 was stored at Hakata Shinkansen Depot until being scrapped in May 2024.
