= Shuta Doi =

Japanese footballer

Shuta Doi 土居柊太
Personal information
- Full name: Shuta Doi
- Date of birth: February 29, 1996 (age 30)
- Place of birth: Tokorozawa, Japan
- Height: 1.73 m (5 ft 8 in)
- Position: Midfielder

Team information
- Current team: Machida Zelvia
- Number: 19

Youth career
- 2011–2013: Hamamatsu Kaiseikan; High School
- 2014–2017: Meiji University

Senior career*
| Years | Team | Apps | (Gls) |
| 2018– | Machida Zelvia | 22 | (2) |
- * Club domestic league appearances and goals as of 30 December 2018

Shuta Doi (土居 柊太, Doi Shūta; born February 29, 1996) is a Japanese football player for Machida Zelvia.

== Career ==
After playing for the football team of Meiji University, Doi joined Machida Zelvia in late 2017.

== Career statistics ==
Updated to 29 August 2018.

Appearances and goals by club, season and competition
| Club | Season | League | | | Emperor's Cup | | Total | |
| Club | Season | Division | Apps | Goals | Apps | Goals | Apps | Goals |
|---|---|---|---|---|---|---|---|---|
| Machida Zelvia | 2018 | J2 League | 9 | 1 | 2 | 0 | 11 | 1 |
| Career total | | | 9 | 1 | 2 | 0 | 11 | 1 |
