= Takero Doi =

Japanese economist

- 土居 丈朗
- Born: August 17, 1970 (age 56); Nara, Nara, Japan

Academic background
- Education: Osaka University (BA); University of Tokyo (MA, PhD)

Takero Doi (土居 丈朗, Doi Takerō; born August 17, 1970 in Nara, Nara) is a Japanese economist. Doi received his B.A. degree from Osaka University in 1993 and Ph.D. degree from the University of Tokyo in 1999. He has served as a professor of economics at Keio University since 2009.

In 2007, Doi was awarded the Fiftieth Nikkei Prize for Excellent Books in Economic Science, Japan Center for Economic Research, and the Twenty-ninth Suntory Prize for Social Sciences, Suntory Foundation.
